= Nasser 56 =

- Theatrical release poster
- Directed by: Mohamed Fadel
- Written by: Mahrouz Abdel-Rahman
- Starring: Ahmed Zaki
- Cinematography: Abdel Latif Fahmi; Essam Farid; Ibrahim Saleh
- Edited by: Kamal Abul Ela (as Kamal Aobut Al-Ela)
- Music by: Yasser Abdel Rahman
- Production company: Egyptian Radio and Television Union
- Release dates: 5 August 1996 (Egypt); 28 August 1996 (Kuwait); October 1996 (U.S.)
- Running time: 140 minutes
- Country: Egypt
- Language: Egyptian Arabic

Nasser 56 is a 1996 Egyptian historical film directed by Mohammed Fadel and starring Ahmed Zaki. The film focuses on the nationalization of the Suez Canal by Egypt's second President, Gamal Abdel Nasser, and the subsequent Suez War with the United Kingdom, France and Israel. The film was filmed in black and white.

Throughout the film, events are depicted from an Egyptian nationalist viewpoint. It features many leading military and civilian figures of the period, including Anwar Sadat, Abdel Hakim Amer, Salah Salem, Zakaria Mohieddin, Abd al-Latif al-Baghdadi, Sami Sharaf, Fathi Radwan and Mahmoud Fawzi. The film's star, Ahmed Zaki, subsequently portrayed Nasser's successor as president, Anwar Sadat, in the 2001 film The Days of Sadat.

== Plot ==
The film takes place in 1956, one of the most important and dangerous periods of President Gamal Abdel Nasser's rule, which witnessed the nationalization of the Suez Canal that led to the Suez War. The film reviews Nasser's relationship with the Revolutionary Command Council, the ministers, his office, as well as the personal aspect with his wife, four children, and father.

== Cast ==
- Ahmed Zaki as President Gamal Abdel Nasser
- Ferdoos Abdel Hamid as Mrs. Tahia Abdel Nasser
- Ahmed Maher as Mahmoud Younis
- Shaaban Hussein as Abdul Hamid Abu Bakr
- Nasser Saif as Mashhour Ahmed Mashhour
- Magdy Sobhi as Mohamed Ezzat Adel
- Tariq Al-Desouki as Abdel Hakim Amer
- Adel Hashem as Abdel Latif Boghdadi
- Mahmoud El Bezzawy as Muhammad Anwar Sadat
- Awad Badawi as Salah Salem
- Ezzat Badran as Gamal Salem
- Muhammad Marzban as Hussein el-Shafei
- Abdel Wahid El-Ashry as Zakaria Mohieddin
- Mokhles El-Behairy as Dr. Mustafa El-Hafnawy
- Ahmed Khalil as Mahmoud Fawzi
- Abdel Rahim Hassan as Abdel Moneim Al-Qaysouni
- Hamed Ibrahim as Fathi Radwan
- Youssef Obaid as Aziz Sidqi
- Muhammad Abouda as Kamal Estino
- Samir Waheed as Mahmoud Al-Jayar
- Hani Ramzy as Mahmoud Fahim
- Yasser Ali Maher as Sami Sharaf
- Amin Hashem as Abdel Nasser Hussein, President Nasser's father
- Mai Essam as Hoda Gamal Abdel Nasser
- Bassem Al-Kilani as Khalid Abdel Nasser
- Fatima Alish as Mona Gamal Abdel Nasser
- Shadi Khafaja as Abdel Hamid Gamal Abdel Nasser
- Hassan Kamy as Robert Menzies
- Ahmed Mukhtar as Ali Sabry

=== Cameo appearances ===
- Amina Rizk
- Hassan Hosni
- Abdullah Farghaly
- Mamdouh Wafi

== See also ==
- List of Egyptian films of the 1990s
- Biopic film
