= The Days of Sadat =

2001 film by Mohamed Khan

Days of Sadat
- DVD cover
- Directed by: Mohamed Khan
- Written by: Ahmad Bahgat
- Produced by: Ahmad Zaki
- Starring: Ahmad Zaki; Mervat Amin; Mona Zaki
- Cinematography: Tarek El-Telmissany
- Edited by: Khaled Merhi; Nadia Shoukry
- Music by: Yasser Abdel-Rahman
- Release date: 26 June 2001
- Running time: 165 minutes
- Country: Egypt
- Language: Egyptian Arabic
- Budget: £E 6,000,000
- Box office: £E 11,000,000 (Egypt)

Days of Sadat (Arabic: أيام السادات) is a 2001 Egyptian biographical film about the third president of Egypt Anwar Al Sadat. The film features Ahmad Zaki as the Egyptian president. The cast includes Mervat Amin, Mona Zaki, and Ahmed El Sakka. The film captured intimate details about the president. One notable characteristic of Sadat was his speech pattern, which Ahmad Zaki captured in his performance.

When the film was released in 2001, it attracted a large audience in Egypt and was ranked as one of the highest-grossing films of the year. It was Ahmed Zaki's second biographical film, following Nasser 56 (1996). Director Mohamed Khan received widespread acclaim for his direction. However, some critics claimed the film was somewhat biased, as it focused solely on Sadat's writings about himself in his book, "In Search of Self."

== Plot ==
The film's opening sequence begins with Anwar Sadat assuming the presidency after the death of President Gamal Abdel Nasser on September 28, 1970, as Vice President. Sadat sits at the desk of former President Gamal Abdel Nasser, then stands contemplating his life from the balcony of his residence in flashbacks. He recalls his role in the national movement against the British occupation, his collaboration with German intelligence during World War II, which led to his imprisonment, and his involvement in the assassination of Amin Osman Pasha, which led to his dismissal from the Egyptian Armed Forces and his subsequent assignment in several menial jobs before returning to the army to join the Free Officers Organization, which carried out the 1952 Revolution.

Sadat's involvement during this period was not limited to politics. According to the film, he was a keen reader, reading Mahatma Gandhi in prison. He later developed a loving heart, exemplified by his relationship with his second wife, Jehan Sadat, despite her being fifteen years younger than him and having an English mother. Sadat's intelligence also made him cautious with everyone. He formed a friendship with a close associate of King Farouk and the force he formed, known as the Iron Guard, at a time when he was a member of the Free Officers, who were seeking to overthrow the king and his corrupt regime. However, on the night of the revolution, he took his wife to the cinema as the officers carried out their movement. Upon his return, he joined them after the revolution had already been carried out, broadcasting the revolution's statement in his own voice.

The film then chronicles the conflict between the Free Officers, the attempted assassination of Gamal Abdel Nasser, the British withdrawal from Egypt, and Gamal Abdel Nasser's subsequent assumption of power and nationalization of the Suez Canal. As a result of the nationalization of the Suez Canal, Britain, France, and Israel declared war on Egypt (the Tripartite Aggression) in 1956. The film then recounts the 1967 war, the death of Abdel Hakim Amer, and Nasser's appointment of Amer as his vice president. Nasser's death, the assumption of the presidency by Sadat and his subsequent struggle with the centers of power and their elimination (the Corrective Revolution), during which he dismissed Vice President Ali Sabri, Minister of the Interior Sharawi Gomaa, Minister of Information Mohamed Fayek, Speaker of Parliament Labib Shoukair, and Presidential Secretary Sami Sharaf, all of whom attempted to stage a coup against the regime. The film recounts how Sadat was almost the sole planner of the October War deception strategy, to the point that he devised plans to deceive Israel while walking through the halls and garden of his palace, only to inform the top military commanders the next day. It also recounts how he successfully pressured the Soviets to hand over the weapons and equipment they had been withholding from Egypt during Nasser's era. Above all, it recounts the details of his unannounced visit to Jerusalem, highlighting his speech in the Knesset with documentary footage of his arrival and reception. A widespread arrest campaign then took place following signs of sectarian strife. The film culminates with Sadat's assassination during a military parade commemorating the anniversary of the October War.

== Cast ==
- Ahmad Zaki as President Anwar Sadat
- Mona Zaki as the young Jehan Al Sadat
- Mervat Amin as First Lady Jehan Al Sadat
- Mohamed El Kholi as President Gamal Abdel Nasser
- Raouf Mustafa as Jehan El Sadat's father
- Laila Shaer as Jehan El Sadat's mother
- Salwa Othman as Eqbal Afifi, Sadat's first wife
- Abdel Rahim Hassan as Hassan Ezzat, Jehan's relative
- Ezzat El Meshed as Ahmed Ismail Ali
- Isaad Younis as Broadcaster Hemat Mostafa
- Sayed Abdel Karim as El Nabawy Ismail
- Youssef Fawzy as Dr. Youssef Rashad
- Ahmed El Sakka as Atef El Sadat
- Ahmed Fouad Selim as Kamal Gawish
- Mukhlis El Beheiry as Mohamed Hassanein Heikal
- Othman Abdel Moneim as University Professor
- Abdel Ghani Nasser as President Mohamed Naguib
- Atiya Owais as Ali Sabri
- Ahmed Diab as Sami Sharaf
- Mahmoud El Iraqi as Sharawi Gomaa
- Fayeq Azab as Acting officer
- Mohamed Marzban as From the Free Officers
- Fekry Abaza as Abdel Hakim Amer
- Ahmed El Halwani as Abdel Moneim Aboul Fotouh
- Afaf Rashad as Hassan Ezzat's wife
- Mohamed El Sabaa as Mohamed Haidar Pasha
- Entesar as Hekmat Fahmy
- Raafat Fawzy as Major General Saad Mamoun
- Assem Nagati as Mohamed Ibrahim Kamel
- Tarek Mandour as Amin Osman
- Galal Abdel Qader as Osman Ahmed Osman
- Mohamed Rihan as Sayed Marei

== Reception ==
When the movie was released in 2001, it attracted a large following in Egypt, ranking as one of Egypt's highest-grossing movies. This was Zaki's second biographical movie, following Nasser 56 (1996).

Director Mohamed Khan received praise for his directing of the movie. However, some critics claimed that the movie was too biased, since it only focused on the writings of Sadat himself from his book, In Search of an Identity. The film grossed over 11 million Egyptian pounds at the time of its release.
