= Mamdouh Salem =

Prime Minister of Egypt from 1975 to 1978

- ممدوح سالم
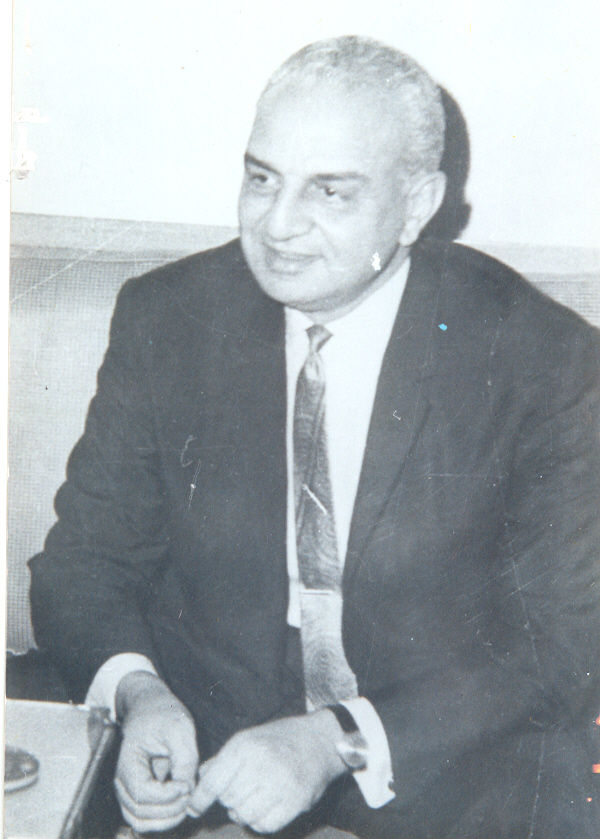

39th Prime Minister of Egypt
- In office 16 April 1975 – 2 October 1978
- President: Anwar Sadat
- Preceded by: Abdel Aziz Mohamed Hegazy
- Succeeded by: Mustafa Khalil

Minister of Interior
- In office 14 May 1971 – 16 April 1976
- President: Anwar Sadat
- Prime Minister: Mahmoud Fawzi; Aziz Sedky; Anwar Sadat; Abdel Aziz Mohamed Hegazy
- Preceded by: Sharawi Gomaa
- Succeeded by: El-Sayed Fahmy
- In office 3 February 1977 – 26 October 1977
- Prime Minister: Himself
- Preceded by: El-Sayed Fahmy
- Succeeded by: Nabawi Ismail

Personal details
- Born: 7 May 1918 Alexandria, Egypt
- Died: 24 February 1988 (aged 69) London, United Kingdom
- Resting place: Alexandria, Egypt
- Party: Arab Socialist Union (until 1976); Egyptian Arab Socialist Party

Mamdouh Mohamed Salem (Arabic: ممدوح سالم, IPA: [mæmˈduːħ mæˈħæmmæd ˈsæːlem]; 7 May 1918 – 24 February 1988) was the 39th Prime Minister of Egypt from 16 April 1975 to 2 October 1978.

== Early life ==
Mamdouh Mohamed Salem was born in Alexandria, Sultanate of Egypt, on 7 May 1918.

== Career ==
Salem served as governor of the Asyut Governorate, Gaarbiya and Alexandria from 1967 to May 1971 and then served as minister of interior from May 1971 to 1975. Salem was named as the prime minister, and his cabinet was formed on April 16, 1975. In 1976 he founded and headed the Egyptian Arab Socialist Party.

After three years as prime minister, Salem was dismissed on 2 October 1978 by President Anwar Sadat. Then Salem was appointed as an advisor to Sadat. Mustafa Khalil succeeded Salem as prime minister.

== Death ==
Salem died in London, England, of an unknown illness on 24 February 1988.

Political offices
Preceded by Abdelaziz Muhammad Hejazi	Prime Minister of Egypt; 1975–1978	Succeeded by Mustafa Khalil
