= Abdel Latif Boghdadi (politician) =

Egyptian politician, air force officer and judge (1917–1999)

- عبد اللطيف البغدادي
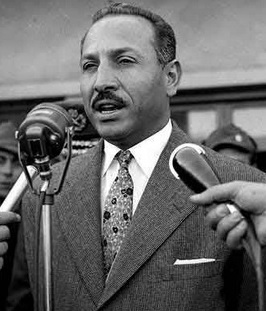
- Boghdadi in 1958

Speaker of the National Assembly of Egypt
- In office 22 July 1957 – 4 July 1958
- Appointed by: National Assembly
- President: Gamal Abdel Nasser
- Prime Minister: Gamal Abdel Nasser
- Preceded by: Inaugural Holder
- Succeeded by: Anwar Sadat

Vice-President of the United Arab Republic
- In office 7 March 1958 – 29 September 1961

Minister of Defense
- In office 8 June 1953 – 7 April 1954
- President: Gamal Abdel Nasser
- Preceded by: Mohamed Naguib
- Succeeded by: Hussein el-Shafei

Personal details
- Born: 20 September 1917 El Mansoura, Egyptian Sultanate
- Died: 9 September 1999 (aged 81) Cairo, Egypt
- Party: Arab Socialist Union
- Occupation: Defense Minister (1953–54); Municipal Affairs Minister (1954); Speaker of the National Assembly (1956); Communications Minister (1957); Vice President of United Arab Republic (1958–1961); Vice President of Egypt (1962–64)

Military service
- Allegiance: Kingdom of Egypt; Egypt
- Branch/service: Egyptian Air Force
- Rank: Wing Commander
- Battles/wars: 1948 Arab–Israeli War; Egyptian Revolution of 1952; Suez War

Abdel Latif Baghdadi (Arabic: عبد اللطيف البغدادي; 20 September 1917 – 9 September 1999) was an Egyptian politician, senior air force officer, and judge. An original member of the Free Officers Movement which overthrew the monarchy in Egypt in the 1952 Revolution, Boghdadi later served as Gamal Abdel Nasser's vice president. The French author Jean Lacouture called Boghdadi "a robust manager" who only lacked "stature comparable to Nasser's." The two leaders had a falling out over Nasser's increasingly socialist and pro-USSR policies and Boghdadi subsequently withdrew from political life in 1964, although he mended ties with Nasser before the latter's death in 1970.

== Early life ==
Boghdadi was born in El Mansoura on 20 September 1917. He excelled at Egypt's military academy in 1938 and, later on, its air force academy. He rose to the rank of wing commander in the Egyptian Air Force and was sent by the Egyptian government under Prime Minister Mustafa el-Nahhas to fight alongside the Arab Liberation Army (ALA) at the onset of the 1948 Arab–Israeli War, prior to the arrival of the Egyptian Army.

== Free Officers and the revolution ==
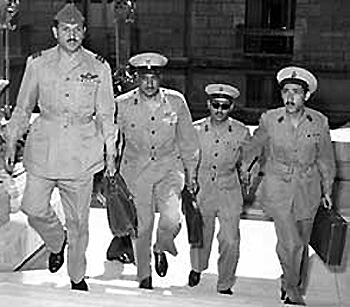
The Free Officers in Cairo, 1952. Boghdadi is shown on the left next to Nasser.

Boghdadi later became one of the original ten members of the Free Officers Movement. During the 1952 revolution led by the Free Officers, Boghdadi commanded jet fighter units to circle around Cairo to prevent possible outside interference in the coup against King Farouk. After the Free Officers assumed power, Gamal Abdel Nasser—the principal leader of the coup and the new Prime Minister of Egypt—made Boghdadi chairman of a special court established to try members of the monarchy, sentencing former general Hussein Sirri Amer and a Wafd Party leader Fouad Serageddin, among others, to long-term prison sentences. Most sentences were commuted, however.

Boghdadi also became a member of the Egyptian Revolutionary Command Council (RCC). In 1953, he was appointed inspector-general of the revolution's first political organization, the Liberation Rally. To remove and replace Muhammad Naguib, the President of Egypt who had been installed by the Free Officers, with Nasser, Nasser replaced the defence minister, a pro-Naguib officer, with Boghdadi for a brief period from 1953 to 1954. When Naguib was removed from his post and arrested in late 1954, Nasser was still prime minister and transferred Boghdadi to municipal affairs minister. During this time, he was responsible for the construction of the Nile Corniche road in Cairo, as well as the construction of many other new roads throughout Egypt.

== Role in Suez Crisis ==
When Israeli forces backed by British and French fighter planes drove out Egyptian forces from the Sinai Peninsula and the Suez Canal—which had been nationalised by Nasser—in 1956, the commander of the Egyptian armed forces, Abdel Hakim Amer, panicked and suggested surrendering. Nasser refused and put Boghdadi in charge of organising Egyptian resistance along the canal. After the Suez War, he was appointed general administrator for the reconstruction of the canal area and according to author Said Aburish, "performed admirably." He was also made minister of communications and, along with Zakaria Mohieddine and Amer, was placed on a committee that screened the candidates of the newly established 350-member National Assembly. Boghdadi was elected as Speaker of the First National Assembly.

== Resignation and aftermath ==
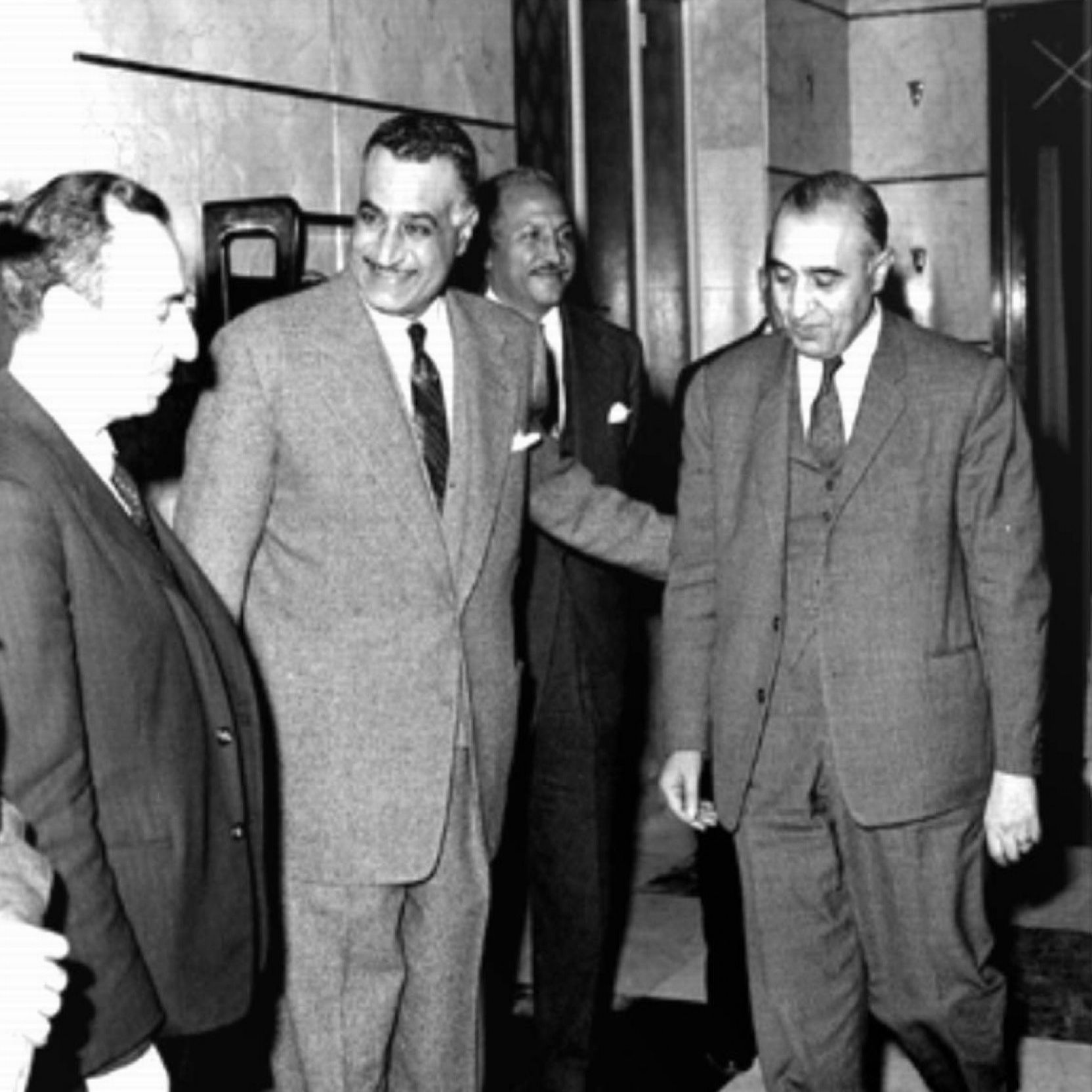
Boghdadi (third from left) with President Gamal Abdel Nasser (second from left) and Ba'ath Party founders Michel Aflaq (first from left) and Salah al-Din al-Bitar (fourth from left) in Syria, 1963

Boghdadi accompanied Nasser on his trip to Damascus on 24 February 1958, after the unification of Syria and Egypt to form the United Arab Republic (UAR). His role in the new republic was, along with Amer, vice president of the Egypt province. In the early 1960s Boghdadi held the additional post of planning minister, and minister responsible for finance. In 1962, shortly after the UAR's collapse, Nasser adopted a more Soviet (USSR)-style economic system for Egypt to which Boghdadi disapproved. He was utterly opposed to the extensive socialist measures and the new system altogether. He announced his resignation, claiming Nasser's behaviour amounted to a loss of direction. Boghdadi also preferred closer relations with the United States, rather than the USSR. In 1963 Boghdadi warned Nasser about Amer—whose relationship with Nasser was particularly close, but eroding at the time—wiretapping his and Nasser's telephones, a situation which he blamed Nasser for allowing.

Boghdadi submitted his resignation again on 16 May 1964, after disagreeing with Nasser's decision to send Egyptian troops to North Yemen to support Nasser's partisans in the civil war. He referred to the war as "Nasser's Vietnam". Boghdadi also wanted a more circumspect policy of "Egypt first". In response to his resignation, Nasser put Boghdadi's brother Saad under house arrest and prevented his brother-in-law from travelling to the United Kingdom to complete his doctorate. Nasser also claimed Boghdadi was implicated in illegal Muslim Brotherhood activities.

== Later life and death ==
As a result of the fallout, Boghdadi withdrew from political life, although the rift between him and Nasser was reconciled before 1970. In his memoirs, Boghdadi states that Nasser had planned to appoint him as vice president immediately before his death in September 1970, in order to prevent then Vice President Anwar el-Sadat's succession to power. According to Nasser's close associates, Nasser requested Boghdadi rejoin the government and become his second-in-command because he considered Sadat a liability. Due to Boghdadi's previous resignation concerning the close relationship to the USSR, he asked Nasser about the nature of the new Egypt-Soviet informal alliance (which came about as a result of Egypt's decisive loss in the 1967 Six-Day War with Israel). They both agreed that Boghdadi visit the USSR alone to ensure there were no differences in perception of what the new relationship between the two countries meant.

In 1972, during Sadat's presidency, Boghdadi and nine other prominent former members of the Egyptian government sent a note to Sadat, criticising his government for "over-dependence on the Soviet Union". Boghdadi opposed Sadat's peace treaty with Israel in 1978, as did all the other then-living former RCC members.

On 8 September 1999 Boghdadi was hospitalised with complications from liver cancer. He was pronounced dead at the age of 81 the next day. A state funeral for Boghdadi was held on 10 September in a Cairo suburb. The ceremonies were attended by Egypt's then president, Hosni Mubarak, and other high-ranking government figures. Mubarak issued a statement saying that Boghdadi had "served his country with devotion".

== List of published works ==
- The Five-Year Plan for the Economic and Social Development of the U.A.R, Cairo: National Planning Committee, 1960, OCLC 311879148
- Mudakkirat Abd el-Latif el-Baghdadi ("Memoirs of Abdel Latif Boghdadi") (in Arabic), Cairo: el-Maktab el-Masri el-Hadith, 1977, OCLC 318028194
- Abdel Latif Boghdadi: Diaries. (1982). Cairo: el-Maktab al-Masri al-Hadith.

== Bibliography ==
- Aburish, Said K. (2004), Nasser, the Last Arab, New York City: St. Martin's Press, ISBN 978-0-312-28683-5
- Vatikiotis, Panayiotis J. (1978), Nasser and his Generation, Taylor & Francis, ISBN 0-85664-433-1

Political offices
| Preceded by Muhammad Naguib | Minister of War; 18 June 1953 – 18 April 1954 | Succeeded by Hussein el-Shafei |
| New title United Arab Republic created | Vice President of the United Arab Republic; Served alongside 11 other vice presidents for varying periods De facto Vice President of Egypt from 28 September 1961 on Syria's secession from UAR; 7 March 1958 – 23 March 1964 | Succeeded by Abdel Hakim Amer; As First Vice President |
| Unknown | Minister of Planning (Central); 8 October 1958 – 19 September 1960 | Succeeded by Nur al-Din Kahala |
