= Ali Shamsi Pasha =

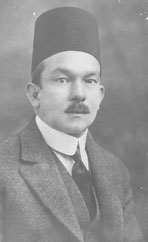
Ali Shamsi Pasha

Ali Shamsi Pasha (also spelled Shamsy, Shemsi, or Chamsi) was an Egyptian statesman.

== Life ==
He was born in Egypt in 1885 the scion of senior members of the Tufenkjians, an Ottoman mounted military corps dating back to the 17th century when Egypt was ruled by walis or governors appointed by the sultan in Istanbul.

=== Family ===
Among Ali's ancestors we find the five Tufenkjian brothers who were exiled to the Hedjaz in 1768 for their attempt at toppling the incumbent governor. Wrapping up four generations of righteous Tufenkjian officers, Ali Shamsi's ancestor, Serwan-Pasha Mohammed Tufkenjian-Shamsi, was aide-de-camp to Mohammed Ali Pasha. Having recently restored the Timraz al-Ahmadi Mosque in Cairo's Darb al-Shamsi (Sayeda Zeinab district), Mohammed was buried therein circa 1817. The mosque had already been renovated the previous century by Mohammed's uncle al-Sharif Hassan Tufenkjian-Shamsi, a devout member of the Sufi al-Qadiriyah Order founded by his maternal ancestor Abdel Qader al-Jilani.

In addition to being a leading industrialist and head of the Ashraaf syndicate in his Delta province, Ali Shamsi's father, Amin Shamsi Pasha, was also Sharkia's ser-tujar, or merchant provost, as well as its recurring representative to the Egyptian legislature up to 1913 despite his much publicized imprisonment for his decisive support of the failed 1882 Orabi Revolt.

=== Role in Politics ===
As Amin Pasha exits the scene, Ali Shamsi Pasha takes over his father's seat at the legislature in 1914. His mission was to define the concept of a distinct Egyptian people blended from an ethnic mix of Copts, Fellahs, Bedouins, Circassians, Turks, Balkans, Levantine, Kurds and Nubians.

=== Exile ===
He was subsequently exiled to Europe for his political convictions he returns triumphantly several years later to cofound with Saad Zaghloul Pasha the nationalist Wafd Party. Ali Shamsi MP became in turn minister of finance and later education and was a sometime candidate to the post of prime minister. He was also Egypt's first representative to the League of Nations. He would later head the National Bank of Egypt (functioned as a Central bank at the time) which heretofore was traditionally chaired by a Briton.

Having spent most of his student and exile years in Switzerland, Ali Shamsi Pasha wed Helene Emile Burnet at Geneva's Eaux Vives neighborhood on 15 August 1928. Absenting himself from the political scene, he joined the board of several leading companies, including the Paris-based Compagnie universelle du canal maritime de Suez up until its nationalization in 1956.

== Death ==
Ali Shamsi died in February 1962.

== Political relations ==
To be noted three of Ali Shamsi's nephews spent time in jail for their political beliefs. Hussein-Zulfiqar Sabry, a disillusioned welterweight prizefighter and brash World War II military-plane hijacker, strived for Sudan's independence prior to becoming the nation's de facto foreign policy chief. Wing Commander Ali Sabri poised at the epicenter of power, first as prime minister and later as party boss only to be outfoxed by his nemesis Anwar al-Sadat. Wahid Raafat, a civil rights advocate calling for a constitutional democracy and the return of the military to their barracks. Later, he would confound the neo-Wafd and play a crucial role in the landmark Taba arbitration.

== See also ==
- Tufenkjians
