= Al Tali'a =

Political magazine in Egypt (1965–1977)

- Editor-in-chief: Lutfi Al Kholi
- Managing Editor: Michel Kamil
- Categories: Political magazine
- Frequency: Monthly
- Publisher: Dar Al Ahram publishing house
- Founder: Michel Kamil; Lutfi Al Kholi
- Founded: 1965
- First issue: January 1965
- Final issue: July 1977
- Country: Egypt
- Based in: Cairo
- Language: Arabic

Al Tali'a (Arabic:الطليعة lit:The Vanguard) was a monthly Marxist magazine which was based in Cairo, Egypt. It was in circulation between 1965 and 1977.

== History and profile ==
Al Tali'a was established by Michel Kamil, an Egyptian Coptic, and Lutfi Al Kholi, and the first issue appeared in January 1965. The magazine was published by the state-run Al Ahram company on a monthly basis, but its editorial was independent due to Mohammed Heikal's protection of Al Tali'a against government influence. Lutfi Al Kholi was the editor-in-chief, and Michel Kamil served as its managing editor until 1970. In the late 1950s the Egyptian Marxist and writer Latifa Zayyat was its editor for the cultural affairs.

In a visit to magazine's offices in Cairo President Gamal Abdel Nasser expressed his views about the editors as follows: "Your role is like St. Peter – you’re here to do propaganda, but not to lead." Nasser's successor President Anwar Sadat dismissed Mohammed Heikal who had been the editor-in-chief of Al Ahram, and therefore, Al Tali'a lost its major defender. Al Tali'a was close to Nasser-era officials, including Sami Sharaf and Sharawi Gomaa, who were arrested in May 1971 after they resigned from office. Following these events the relationship of the magazine with the Sadat government became much more strained, and in 1977 it was redesigned as a youth magazine. Al Tali'a was closed down by the government in 1977, and the last issue was published in July that year.

== Political stance and content ==
The magazine had a Marxist political stance and featured articles by the Egyptian Marxists. Following the defeat in the 1967 war against Israel Al Tali'a began to offer analyses of this incident. The magazine published articles on the 1968 student movements in Egypt and in other countries written by Saad Zahran. It also adopted an anti-Zionist approach and argued that until World War II Zionism had not been an influential ideology for the Jewish people in Europe and that Jews should be reintegrated into the Arab societies.

The topics covered in Al Tali'a were mostly about the Arab socialism and the relationships with the Soviet Union. However, it also included articles about various policies implemented in Egypt, including educational policies. The magazine was a mild critic of Gamal Abdel Nasser. Lutfi Al Kholi published many articles emphasizing the barriers against the revolution which had been included in the nationalist charter developed following the 1952 revolution in Egypt. He also made interviews with the leading figures of the period, including the Fatah leader Salah Khalaf which was featured in June 1960s.

The political and military communiques of the Palestinian Fatah group were published in Al Tali'a in the late 1960s although their publication was banned by the Arab states. The magazine also published the Israeli communiques about the operations to avoid legal sanctions. An article of George Habash, leader of the Popular Front for the Liberation of Palestine, was featured in the magazine.

In addition to the political content Al Tali'a also featured comprehensive analyses about literary tendencies of the writers at that period. One such analysis was published in 1969 which reported the findings of a survey collected from writers and articles. From 1972 Al Tali'a published a literary supplement of which the editor was Yahya Haqqi who had been fired from the editorship of the cultural magazine Al Majalla in 1970.

=== Contributors ===
Some of the contributors of Al Tali'a included Mohammed Sid Ahmed and Abou Seif Youssef who also headed the magazine. They provided the ideological basis for the left-leaning leadership in the country. In the early 1970s Samir Farid worked for the magazine as a film critic.
