= Sami Sharaf =

Egyptian military officer and politician (1929–2023)

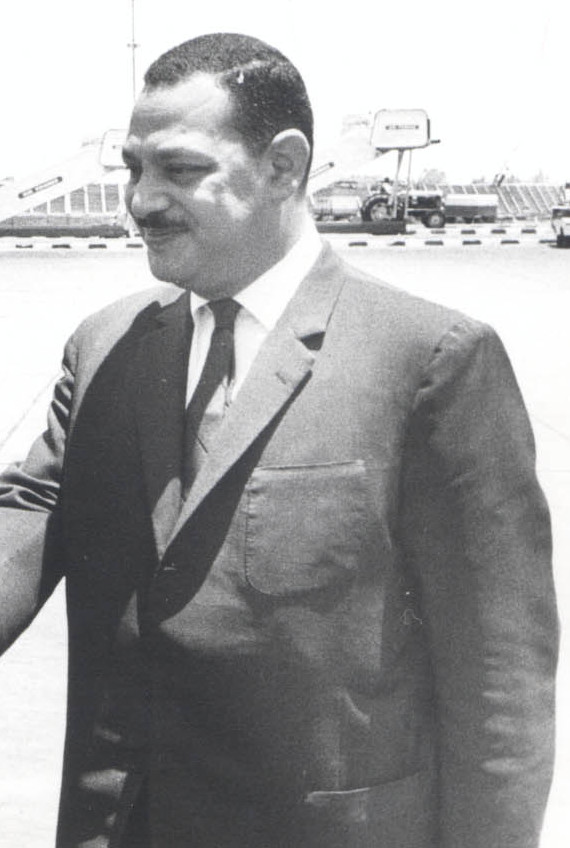
- Sharaf in 1970

Minister of State for Presidential Affairs
- In office 28 September 1961 – May 1971
- President: Gamal Abdel Nasser; Anwar Sadat
- Succeeded by: Muhammad Ahmad Muhammad

Personal details
- Born: 20 April 1929 Heliopolis, Cairo, Kingdom of Egypt
- Died: 23 January 2023 (aged 93) Cairo, Egypt
- Party: Arab Socialist Union; Arab Democratic Nasserist Party
- Education: Military Academy

Sami Sharaf (Arabic: سامي شرف; 20 April 1929 – 23 January 2023) was an Egyptian military officer who held various posts during the presidency of Gamal Abdel Nasser. His public roles ended in May 1971 when he was arrested and then imprisoned by the Egyptian authorities under the presidency of Anwar Sadat.

== Early life and education ==
Sharaf was born in Heliopolis, Cairo on 20 April 1929. His father, Mohamed Abdel Aziz Sharaf, was a physician who was trained in Edinburgh, United Kingdom, and served as the director of Beni Suef Governorate. Sami had five siblings.

Sharaf graduated from the Military Academy in February 1949. One of his teachers at the academy was Gamal Abdel Nasser.

== Career and activities ==
Following his graduation Sharaf joined the army. In January 1953 he was arrested in the artillery crackdown and jailed. After he was freed, he began to work in the military intelligence unit. He was part of the Free Officers movement's left-wing faction.

Sharaf was the head of the Presidential Office. He was primarily in charge of the security of President Gamal Abdel Nasser being one of Nasser's personal support personnel.

On 28 September 1961, Sharaf was named as the state minister for presidential affairs. When the Arab Nationalist Movement (ANM) had disputes with the Syrians and the United Arab Republic was dissolved in 1961 the ANM developed direct ties with Egypt under the coordination of Sharaf. He was a member of the Arab Socialist Union (ASU) and was part of its secret unit, the Socialist Vanguard (Arabic: al-Tanzim al-Tali‘i), which was also called the Vanguard Organization. The unit was established in 1963 and was headed by Sharaf and Sharawi Gomaa. Saudi King Faisal claimed that Sharaf was involved in a plot against him in June 1969. As of 1971 Sharaf was one of the Vanguard secretariat's ten members.

Sharaf served as the minister of state under the presidency of Anwar Sadat. Sharaf's tenure ended on 13 May 1971 when he resigned from office. He was succeeded by Muhammad Ahmad Muhammad as minister of state on 14 May.

Shortly after his resignation Sharaf was arrested due to his alleged involvement in a planned coup to overthrow Anwar Sadat. The reason for the arrest of Sharaf and other officials such as Sharawi Gomaa was that they had been supported by the ASU, the leftist figures affiliated with the Al Tali'a magazine, and the business elites. Sharaf was sentenced to death, but in December 1971 his sentence was reduced to life imprisonment. He was released from the prison on 15 May 1981. Sharaf was among the cofounders of the Arab Democratic Nasserist Party, but later he left it.

Sharaf was an anti-communist and supported the establishment of a capitalist state. However, he was considered to be a Soviet agent from 1955. Following his removal from office in 1971 Ashraf Marwan who was the son-in-law of Nasser and an intelligence officer working under Sharaf, was given the task of coordinating the intelligence affairs. As of 2011 Sharaf was part of the Egyptian Committee at the Afro-Asian Peoples' Solidarity Organization.

Sharaf published a book on his memoirs, Sanawat wa ayam ma‘ Jamal ‘Abd al Nasir: Shahadat Sami Sharaf, in 2006. He contributed to the Egyptian newspapers Al-Ahram and Al-Masry Al-Youm, and his last article appeared on 8 April 2021.

== Personal life and death ==
Sharaf was married and had four children. He died in Cairo on 23 January 2023 at the age of 93. Funeral prayers for him took place in Cairo with the attendance of Abdel Hakim Abdel Nasser, a son of Gamal Abdel Nasser.

=== In popular culture ===
Sami Sharaf was one of the characters in the 1996 Egyptian film Nasser 56 and in the 2001 Egyptian film entitled The Days of Sadat. He was featured by Slimane Dazi in The Angel, a 2018 Netflix film.
