= Egyptian Revolution =

The Egyptian Revolution may refer to:

- The Urabi revolt, a nationalist uprising in Egypt from 1879 to 1882, aimed at deposing Khedive Tewfik Pasha and ending British and French influence
- The 1919 Egyptian revolution, led by Saad Zaghlul and the Wafd Party against the British occupation of Egypt
- The Egyptian revolution of 1952, led by Muhammad Naguib, Gamal Abdel Nasser and the Free Officers Movement, which precipitated the overthrow of the Egyptian monarchy
- Corrective revolution (Egypt), a purge by President Anwar Sadat against Nasserist elements of the government
- Egyptian Crisis (2011–2014), a period of unrest and political change in Egypt
  - 2011 Egyptian revolution, a series of mass popular protests leading to the resignation of President Hosni Mubarak
  - 2013 Egyptian coup d'état, the overthrow of President Morsi by General Abdel Fattah el-Sisi
- Egypt's Revolution, a radical underground Nasserist political group
