= Corrective revolution (Egypt) =

Reform introduced by Anwar Sadat in Egypt

Corrective movement
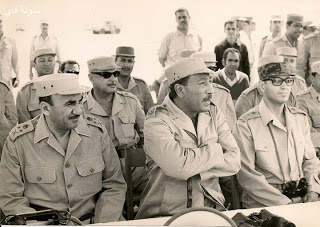
- Anwar Sadat with military officers of Egyptian Army, 1971
- Date: 15 May 1971
- Location: Egypt
- Participants: Anwar Sadat
- Outcome: Anwar Sadat's consolidation of power; Radical changes in Egypt's politics, economy, and foreign policy; Purge of Nasserists, pro-Soviet, and left-wing officials

The corrective revolution, (officially launched as the "corrective movement") often termed de-Nasserization, was a reform program launched on 15 May 1971 by President Anwar Sadat. It involved purging Nasserist members of the government and security forces, often considered pro-Soviet and left-wing, and drumming up popular support by presenting the takeover as a continuation of the Egyptian Revolution of 1952, while at the same time radically changing track on issues of foreign policy, economy, and ideology. This includes a large shift in Egyptian diplomacy, building ties to the United States and Israel, while breaking from the USSR and, after signing the Egyptian–Israeli Peace Treaty, Egypt's subsequent suspension from the Arab League.

Sadat's corrective revolution also included the imprisonment of other political forces in Egypt, including leftists and officials still loyal to Nasserism. Sadat used the corrective revolution as a way to 'exorcise Nasser's ghost' from Egyptian politics, and to establish his domestic legitimacy.

== Political reforms ==
Shortly after taking office, Sadat shocked many Egyptians by the dismissal and imprisonment of Vice President Ali Sabri and Interior Minister Sharawy Gomaa, who controlled the secret police. Sadat's popularity rose as he curtailed the secret police, expelled Soviet military from the country and reformed the Egyptian army for a renewed confrontation with Israel. During this time, Egypt was suffering greatly from economic problems caused by the Six-Day War and the Soviet relationship also declined due to their unreliability and refusal of Sadat's requests for more military support.

== Economic reforms ==
In an attempt to revitalize the economy, Sadat enacted the Infitah, a series of policies that attempted to open the economy to Western private investment. Despite significant changes in areas such as loan, tariff, and tax policies, the increase in capitalistic investment was disappointing. This was at least partially due to public hesitation to the change, not wanting to lose the gains in education, equality, and wages made during the Nasser administration, or national sovereignty to foreign powers. The public sector therefore retained a large amount of control over the economy, leading Western investors to remain relatively suspicious of Egypt. Regardless, capital investments did come, and the economy experienced a slow but steady recovery in the following years.

== Opposition movements ==
In the early years of his presidency, Sadat encouraged older, more moderate Islamist groups and intellectuals, freeing political activists imprisoned by President Nasser, and even promoting of ex-Muslim Brotherhood leaders such as Sheikth al Ghazali to state positions. His motives were two-fold: provide a conservative foil to leftists that maintained the ideals of the previous administration, and to hopefully appease more rebellious Islamist movements, such as the rapidly growing al-Jama'a al-Islamiyya. However, when Sadat began to initiate peace talks with Israel in 1977, his tenuous management of jihadist groups began to fail rapidly. These talks were a sharp change in Sadat's international policy, who said of Israel in 1970, "Don't ask me to make diplomatic relations with them. Never. Never. Leave it to the coming generations to decide that, not me." Most notably, despite Sadat's initial minimum demand for Palestinian self-determination, the treaty signed in 1979 made no definite plan for Palestinian independence. By 1981, Egyptian discontent peaked, including multiple violent riots including various radical Islamist organizations, to which Sadat responded with uncharacteristic force, detaining 1,600 opponents, followed by the forced expulsion of over 1,000 Soviet citizens he accused of conspiracy. During a parade in October 1981, Sadat was shot by a group of extremists, connected to various Islamist groups.

== See also ==
- 1919 Egyptian revolution – 1918–1919 revolution in Egypt
- Corrective Move – 1969 Marxist internal coup in South Yemen
- Corrective Revolution (Syria) – 1970 coup led by Hafez al-Assad
- De-Ba'athification – Policy undertaken in Iraq by the Coalition Provisional Authority (CPA)
- Ramadan Revolution – 1963 Ba'athist military coup in Iraq
- June 13 Corrective Movement – 1974 coup in the Yemen Arab Republic
