= Samir Farid =

Egyptian writer and film critic

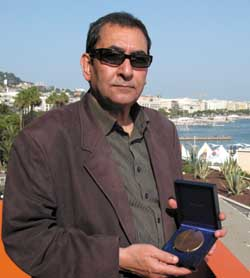
- Born: December 1, 1943; Cairo, Kingdom of Egypt
- Died: April 4, 2017 (aged 73)
- Occupations: Writer, film critic

Samir Farid (Arabic: سمير فريد, IPA: [sæˈmiːɾ fæˈɾiːd]) (December 1, 1943 – April 4, 2017) was an Egyptian writer and a world renowned film critic, journalist and film historian based in Cairo. He authored and/or translated over 60 books since 1966 on Egyptian, Arab and World cinema. He was the consultant for Cinema affairs in the Bibliotheca Alexandrina. (2001-2016).

He was a member of jury in International film festivals since 1972. (Among them Oberhausen Film Festival 1978, DOC Leipzig Film festival 1984, Annecy International Animated Film Festival 1998, Torino Film Festival 2001, Controcorrente (Upstream section) of Venice Film Festival 2003, Thessaloniki Film Festival 2003 and Taormina Film Festival 2010.)

He also was the Head of The Cairo International Film Festival 2014.

== Biography ==
Samir Farid was born in Cairo, Egypt in 1943. He graduated in 1965 from the High Institute of Dramatic Arts, department of Criticism, Academy of Arts. His graduation thesis was entitled "The Meaning of Silence in Waiting for Godot by Samuel Beckett". He also worked as the film Critic of Al-Gomhoreya daily in Cairo since 1965. Since 1967, he has been invited to more than 200 film festivals and seminars in Africa, Asia, USA and Europe.

He was a member of the Board in the Egyptian magazines Al-Cinema (1969) and Al Tali'a (Arabic: الطليعة ) in 1973, the Algerian magazine Al-Shshtan (1979) and the Cypriot magazine Al-Ofok (1987).

He was a co-founder of the National Festival of Short and Documentary films (1970), the National Festival of Feature Films (1971), the Arab Film Critics Union and the Egyptian Film Critics Association, (1972).

Member of FIPRESCI since 1971.

Member of International Jury Boards since 1972.

The editor-in-chief of the Egyptian weekly journal El-Cinema Wa El-Finoun, 1977.

Member of the International Initiating Committee of the General History of Cinema 1982.

The representative of Variety in Cairo 1981–1985.

Member of the Consultative Board of the Minister of Culture, 1989.

The Cinema Supervisor at Bibliotheca Alexandrina, 2001.

== Published books ==
- Cinema 65, Cairo, 1966
- Film Guide 66, Cairo, 1967
- U.S.A. Films in the Arab World, Cairo, 1967
- Fahrenheit 451 (Film by François Truffaut), Cairo, 1967
- The World through the Eye of the Camera (Cinema 66-67), Cairo, 1968
- Cinema 69 (Cinema 68-69), Cairo, 1970
- Cinema 70, Cairo, 1971
- Dictionary of Selected Egyptian Film Directors, Cairo, 1974
- October War into Film, Cairo, 1975
- On Cannes Festival (1967–1973), Cairo, 1978
- Arab Cinema Guide(Arabic-English) (Dossier on Egypt), Cairo, 1978
- Arab Cinema Guide(Arabic-English) (Dossier on Iraq), Cairo, 1979
- Reflections on Contemporary Cinema, Baghdad, 1979
- Studies on Arab Cinema, Beirut, 1981
- An introduction to Zionism Cinema, Beirut, 1981
- Shakespearean Films, Beirut, 1981
- The Identity of the Arab Cinema, Beirut, 1988
- Naguib Mahfouz and the Cinema, Cairo, 1990
- Dialogue with 24 World Film, Cairo, 1991
- Reflections on Chahine's Cinema, Cairo, 1992
- The New Realism in Egyptian Cinema, Cairo, 1992
- Cannes Film Festival (1946–1991), Beirut, 1992
- The Arab-Zionism Conflict in Cinema, Cairo, 1992
- Cinema of Oppression, Cinema of Liberation, Damascus, 1992
- Dialogues With 15 Egyptian Filmmakers, Cairo, 1993
- Children's Cinema, Cairo, 1994
- Unknown Pages in Egyptian Cinema, Cairo, 1994
- Faten Hamama, Cairo, 1995
- Reflections on Chahine's Cinema (2nd Edition), Cairo, 1997
- The Palestinian Cinema in the Occupied Lands, Cairo, 1997
- The Contemporary Arab Cinema, Cairo, 1998
- The History of the Filmmakers' Syndicate in Egypt, Cairo, 1999
- Hassan Imam Omar: The Pillar of the Cinema Press in Egypt, Cairo, 1999
- The Writers of Egypt and the Cinema, Cairo, 1999
- Directors and Directions in Arab Cinema, Bahrain, 2000
- Directors and Directions in Egyptian Cinema, Cairo, 2000
- Zouzou Hamdi El-Hakim: A Pioneer of Acting and Enlightenment, Cairo, 2000
- Stars and Legends in Egyptian Cinema, Cairo, 2000
- Films in the Shadow, Cairo, 2000
- Introduction to the History of Arab Cinema, Cairo, 2000
- Introduction to the History of Arab Cinema (Italian), Tunis, 2001
- Directors and Directions in American Cinema, Damascus, 2001
- The History of Film Censorship in Egypt, Cairo, 2002
- Shakespeare, The Screenwriter, Cairo, 2002
- Cannes Film Festival Guide (1946–2001), Alexandria, 2002
- Studies on the History of Egyptian Cinema, Cairo, 2002
- Directors and Directions in European Cinema, Damascus, 2003
- World Writers and Cinema, Cairo, 2003
- Venice Film Festival Guide (1932–2003), Alexandria, 2004
- Political Issues on Cinema Screen, Damascus, 2004
- The Cinema in the European Union Member States (4 Volumes), Cairo, 2004
- Cinema and Arts, Cairo, 2005
- The New Wave in Egyptian Cinema, Damascus, 2005

== See also ==
- Lists of Egyptians
- نقاد مصريون
