= 1969 Saudi Arabian coup attempt =

Failed coup d'état

1969 Saudi Arabian coup d'état attempt
- Part of the Cold War
Date	June–July 1969
Location	Saudi Arabia
Result	Coup failed; Coup leaders arrested imprisoned or executed

Belligerents
(Saudi Arabia) Arabian Peninsula People's Union: Members of the Royal Saudi Air Force	Saudi Arabia

Commanders and leaders
(Saudi Arabia) Col. Daoud Roumi (executed) (Saudi Arabia) Col. Said al-Omari (executed) (Saudi Arabia) Maj. Yusuf Tawwil (executed)	Faisal of Saudi Arabia; Crown Prince Khalid; Prince Fahd; Prince Sultan; Prince Abdullah; Kamal Adham; Prince Badr

Strength
200–300 Officers and civilians	Thousands

The 1969 Saudi Arabian coup d'état attempt was a failed coup d'état planned by numerous high-ranking members of the Royal Saudi Air Force that resulted in King Faisal ordering the arrest of hundreds of military officers, including some generals. The arrests were possibly based on a tip from an American intelligence agency. A previous coup attempt had also occurred against King Faisal in 1966.

== Background ==
The 1950s and 1960s saw numerous coups d'état in the region. Muammar Gaddafi's coup that overthrew the monarchy in oil-rich Libya in 1969 was especially ominous for Saudi Arabia due to the similarity between the two sparsely populated desert countries. As a result, King Faisal built a sophisticated security apparatus, and cracked down firmly on dissent. As in all affairs, King Faisal justified these policies in Islamic terms. Early in his reign, when faced by demands for a written constitution for the country, King Faisal responded that "our constitution is the Quran."

== Plot ==
The plotters controlled some air force planes. Their plan was for these planes to bomb the Royal Palace in Riyadh, to kill the King and the other high ranking princes who might succeed him. After the King and princes were dead, the plotters planned to announce the formation of the Republic of the Arabian Peninsula.

Many of the conspirators were of Hejazi origin; there was an independent Kingdom of Hejaz, until it was annexed by the Saudis in 1925. One of the key conspirators, Yusuf Tawwil, a Hejazi merchant and acquaintance of Prince Fahd, was believed to hold Hejazi separatist beliefs. Others involved in the plot were Najdis or Sunnis from the Eastern Province.

After the Saudi government discovered the coup, a wave of mass arrests followed, including the arrest of 28 Lieutenant Colonels and 30 Majors alongside around 200 other officers. By the end of 1969 about 2,000 people had been arrested in connection with the coup attempt. Some other participants managed to flee the country. A number of coup participants were executed including two Colonels, Daoud Roumi and Said al Omari.

King Faisal claimed that the failed coup had been planned by the Egyptian officials and that Sami Sharaf was the planner of the plot.

== Aftermath ==
Immediately after the incident, the relations between King Faisal and Prince Fahd, interior minister, became tense. Because the king accused Prince Fahd of being late to take steps to suppress the coup. Following this disagreement Prince Fahd left the country and stayed in Europe until May 1970.
