= Sharawi Gomaa =

Egyptian politician (1920–1988)

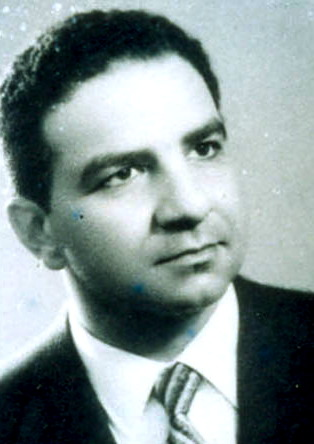

Deputy Prime Minister
- In office 1966 – 13 May 1971
- President: Gamal Abdel Nasser; Anwar Sadat

Minister of Interior
- In office 10 September 1966 – 14 May 1971
- President: Gamal Abdel Nasser; Anwar Sadat
- Prime Minister: Mohamed Sedki Sulayman; Gamal Abdel Nasser; Mahmoud Fawzi
- Preceded by: Zakaria Mohieddin
- Succeeded by: Mamdouh Salem

Personal details
- Born: 1920
- Died: 28 November 1988 (aged 67–68)
- Party: Arab Socialist Union
- Education: Military Academy

Sharawi Gomaa (1920–1988) was an Egyptian military officer who served in various posts, including governor of Suez, deputy prime minister and minister of interior, during the presidency of Gamal Abdel Nasser. He was part of the May Group who were removed from the office by Anwar Sadat in May 1971.

== Biography ==
Gomaa was born in 1920. He graduated from the Military College. He obtained a master's degree in military sciences 1951. Then he worked as a teacher at the Military College.

Gomaa was part of the Free Officers movement's left-wing faction. He joined the General Intelligence Directorate serving as its deputy director between 1957 and 1961. When the Arab Nationalist Movement (ANM) had disputes with the Syrians and the United Arab Republic was dissolved in 1961 the ANM developed direct ties with Egypt. Gomaa coordinated the operations of the ANM as part of the Egyptian General Intelligence Directorate.

Gomaa was appointed governor of Suez in 1961 which he held until 1964. He joined the Arab Socialist Union in 1962 and was made a member of its secretariat in November 1964.

Gomaa was appointed minister of state to the cabinet of the United Arab Republic led by Zakaria Mohieddin on 2 October 1965. Gomaa was named as the minister of Interior and deputy prime minister in 1966 in a cabinet reshuffle. He replaced Zakaria Mohieddin as minister of Interior who had held the post since 2 October 1965. Gomaa was named as the minister of Interior in a cabinet reshuffle in May 1968. During his term as minister of Interior, he was in control of the secret police. He also established the Police Cadets Institute in late 1960s. He was the secretary general of the Arab Socialist Union in 1969 and was part of its secret unit, the Socialist Vanguard (Arabic: al-Tanzim al-Tali‘i), which was also called the Vanguard Organization. This unit was established in 1963 and was headed by Gomaa and Sami Sharaf. As of 1971 Gomaa was one of the Vanguard secretariat's ten members.

Gomaa resigned from his post as minister of interior with other Gamal Abdel Nasser supporters in the cabinet on 13 May 1971. These officials are called the May Group. Gomaa's successor as minister of interior was Mamdouh Salem who was appointed to the post on 14 Mat 1971.

Following this incident Gomaa was arrested and tried due to his alleged participation in the planned coup against Anwar Sadat. The reason for the arrest of Gomaa and others such as Sami Sharaf was that they had been supported by the ASU, the leftist figures affiliated with the Al Tali'a magazine, and the business elites. Gomaa was sentenced to death, but in December 1971 his sentence was reduced to life imprisonment.

Gomaa was an anti-communist and supported the establishment of a capitalist system. However, he was one of the Egyptian officials who preferred to get support from the Soviet Union, particularly after the defeat of Egypt in the Six-Day War in 1967. He died on 28 November 1988.
