= Mohammed Fadel =

Egyptian film director

- محمد فاضل
- Born: Mohamed Fadel; June 22, 1938 (age 88); Alexandria, Egypt
- Education: Alexandria University
- Occupations: television and film director
- Spouse: Ferdoos Abdelhamid (m. 1984)

Mohammed Fadel (name also spelled Muhammad Fadil; born 22 June 1938) is a veteran Egyptian television and film director. Fadel, along with Osama Anwar Okasha and Inaam Mohamed Ali, is credited in Egypt for establishing the genre of Egyptian dramatic serial television. He is considered a "godfather" of Egyptian television serials.

== Career ==
Fadel began his career in the 1950s in radio. He wrote a number of television series in the 1960s and 1970s, the most notable of which was the comedic soap opera Al-Qahira wa-l-nas ("Cairo and the People"), which was themed on modernity and cultural authenticity. Divided into half-hour segments, the show was similar to American sitcom television, making it unique in Egyptian media during its time. Afterwards, he directed a psychological film Etnen Wahed Sifr ("2-1-0") (1974) starring Salah Zulfikar, it was a breakthrough, followed by the Ramadan soap operas Abna'i Al-A'izza', Shukran ("Dear Children, Thank You") in the late 1970s, Rihlat El-Sayyid Abul-Ela El-Bishri ("The Journey of Mr Abul-Ela El-Bishri") in the 1980s, Li Dawa'i Amniya ("For Security Measures") in 2005, and Sekket el-Hilali ("El-Hilali's Path") in 2006.

His reputation was significantly raised with his television series "White Flag" (1989), written by Okasha. The show was set in Alexandria and dealt with Egypt's wide income disparity, criminals-turned-wealthy, and Egyptian high life. Fadel directed the 1982 romance film Hobb fil Zinzana ("Love in the Prison Cell") starring Soad Hosny, the first film on Egyptian president Gamal Abdel Nasser in Nasser 56 (1996) starring Ahmed Zaki, and Egyptian singer Umm Kulthum in the 1999 film Kawkab al-Sharq ("Star of the Orient"). The latter starred Fadel's wife, veteran actress Ferdous Abdel-Hamid.

== Bibliography ==
- Armbrust, Walter (1996), Mass Culture and Modernism in Egypt, Cambridge University Press, ISBN 9780521484923
- Asante, Molefi K. (2002), Culture and Customs of Egypt, Greenwood Publishing Group, ISBN 9780313317408
- Hammond, Andrew (2007), Popular Culture in the Arab World: Arts, Politics, and the Media, American University in Cairo Press, ISBN 9789774160547
