= Mohamed Sedki Sulayman =

Egyptian politician (1919–1996)

- محمد صدقي سليمان
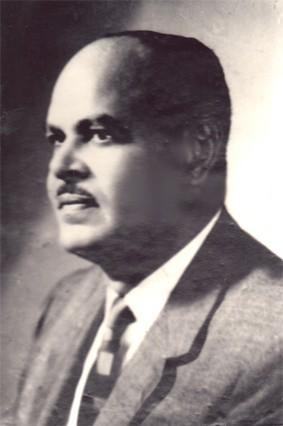

34th Prime Minister of Egypt
- In office 10 September 1966 – 19 June 1967
- President: Gamal Abdel Nasser
- Preceded by: Zakaria Mohieddin
- Succeeded by: Gamal Abdel Nasser

Personal details
- Born: 1919
- Died: 28 March 1996 (aged 76–77)

Military service
- Branch/service: Egyptian Army
- Years of service: 1938–1952
- Rank: lieutenant colonel
- Battles/wars: 1948 Arab–Israeli War

Mohamed Sedki Sulayman (Arabic: محمد صدقي سليمان; 1919 – 28 March 1996) was an Egyptian politician and prime minister of Egypt from 10 September 1966 to 19 June 1967.

Between 1962 and 1966, he was the minister supervising the building of the Aswan High Dam.

== Six-Day War ==
During Sulayman's last month as Prime Minister, the Six-Day War was fought from 5 to 10 June 1967 by Israel and the states of Egypt (known then as the United Arab Republic), Jordan, and Syria. The outcome was a decisive Israeli victory. Israel took effective control of the Gaza Strip and the Sinai Peninsula from Egypt, the West Bank from Jordan, and the Golan Heights from Syria.

== Central Audit Organisation ==
Muhammed Sedki Sulayman was the head of the Central Audit Organisation (CAO) of Egypt between 15 November 1971 and 17 January 1978.

== Death ==
Sulayman died on 28 March 1996.

Political offices
Preceded by Zakaria Mohieddin	Prime Minister of Egypt; 1966–1967	Succeeded by Gamal Abdel Nasser
