= Abdel Hakim Amer =

Egyptian politician and general (1919–1967)

- عبد الحكيم عامر
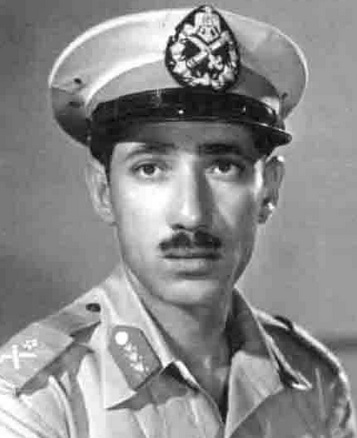
- Amer in 1955

Vice President of Egypt
- In office 7 March 1958 – 30 September 1965
- President: Gamal Abdel Nasser
- Preceded by: Office established
- Succeeded by: Zakaria Mohieddin

Governor of Syria
- In office 22 October 1959 – 28 September 1961
- President: Gamal Abdel Nasser
- Preceded by: Office established
- Succeeded by: Office abolished

Minister of Defense
- In office 31 August 1954 – 29 September 1962
- President: Gamal Abdel Nasser
- Preceded by: Hussein el-Shafei
- Succeeded by: Abdel Wahab el-Beshry

Chief of Staff of the Egyptian Army
- In office 18 June 1953 – 11 June 1967
- President: Mohamed Naguib; Gamal Abdel Nasser
- Preceded by: Mohamed Naguib
- Succeeded by: Mohamed Fawzi

Personal details
- Born: 11 December 1919 Samalut, Sultanate of Egypt
- Died: 13 September 1967 (aged 47) Cairo, United Arab Republic
- Resting place: Samalut, Egypt
- Spouse: Berlenti Abdul Hamid
- Relations: Mohammed Haidar Pasha, Uncle

Military service
- Allegiance: Egypt
- Branch/service: Egyptian Army
- Years of service: 1939–1967
- Rank: Field Marshal
- Commands: Chief of Staff; Commander-in-Chief of the Joint Military Command of Egypt and Syria
- Battles/wars: 1948 Arab–Israeli War; Suez Crisis; North Yemen Civil War; Six-Day War
- Awards: Hero of the Soviet Union

Mohamed Abdel Hakim Amer (Note: Arabic: محمد عبد الحكيم عامر, IPA: [mæˈħæmmæd ʕæbdelħæˈkiːm ˈʕæːmeɾ]) (11 December 1919 – 13 September 1967), better known as Abdel Hakim Amer, was an Egyptian military officer and politician. Amer served in the 1948 Arab–Israeli War, and played a leading role in the military coup that overthrew King Farouk in 1952. After leading Egyptian forces in the 1956 Suez war, he was appointed Minister for Defense by President Gamal Abdel Nasser and was Egyptian Vice President between 1958 and 1965. In October 1959, he assumed the role of Syria's governor, holding presidential authority.

== Early life and education ==
Amer was born in Samalut, in the El Minya on 11 December 1919. He was from an affluent family, and his father was a land owner and village mayor. His maternal uncle Mohammed Haidar Pasha served as the minister of war during the reign of King Farouk.

After finishing school, Amer attended the Egyptian Military Academy and graduated in 1938. He was commissioned into the Egyptian Army in 1939.

== Military career ==
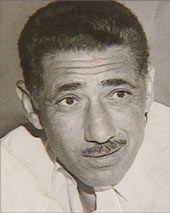
Abdel Hakim Amer

Amer served in the 1948 Arab–Israeli War, in the same unit as Gamal Abdel Nasser. He then took part in the 1952 Revolution and commanded the Egyptian Army in the Suez Crisis, the North Yemen Civil War and the Six-Day War.

Amer played a leading role in the military coup that overthrew King Farouk in 1952 and brought General Muhammad Naguib and Colonel Gamal Abdel Nasser to power. The following year, Amer was promoted straight from major to major-general, bypassing four military ranks, and was made Egypt's Chief of the General Staff. In 1956, Amer was appointed commander-in-chief of the joint military command established by Egypt and Syria. He also led Egyptian forces against both Israeli and allied British-French forces during the 1956 Suez war. After the fighting ended, Amer accused Nasser of provoking an unnecessary war and then blaming the military for the result. As Nasser's representative in Syria, Amer was detained by rebels during the 1961 Syrian coup d'état and sent back to Cairo.

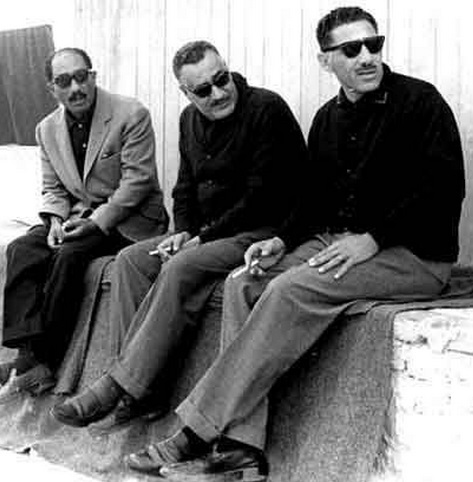
Amer (right) with President Gamal Abdel Nasser (center) and Speaker of Parliament Anwar Sadat (left), 1965

In March 1964, Amer was made first vice-president to Nasser and deputy supreme commander, with the power to rule for 60 days if the president was incapacitated.

Amer's distinguished career came to a sudden end after Egypt's crushing defeat by Israel in the Six-Day War of June 1967. Many historians, including Hazem Kandil, place much of the responsibility for the Egyptian military's failure in the 1967 war at the feet of Amer. This was because Amer's control of the Egyptian military establishment was in line with President Gamal Abdel-Nasser's general policy of making different government institutions fiefdoms to those most loyal to him. In addition, the proxy war Egypt (with Soviet backing) fought against the Saudis, Western powers and Israelis in the North Yemen Civil War (1962–1970), with Nasser supporting the Yemen Arab Republic against the Western and Saudi Arabian backed Royalists, is also viewed as being key to Egypt's defeat in the 1967 Middle East war; as nearly half of the Egypt's Western-trained officer-corps (mostly in Britain at Sandhurst) were in Yemen at the time of the initial Israeli attack on Egypt. On 6 June 1967 on the second day of the Six-Day War, when Amer heard of the fall of Abu-Ageila to Israel, he was said to have panicked and ordered all units in the Sinai to retreat. This order effectively meant the defeat of Egypt and thus turning the Egyptian retreat into a rout. On 17 June 1967 shortly after the Six Day War ended, Amer was relieved of all his duties and forced into early retirement.

== Arrest and contested cause of death ==
In August 1967, Amer, along with over 50 Egyptian military officers and two former ministers, including Shams Badran, were arrested for allegedly plotting a coup to overthrow Gamal Abdel Nasser. Amer was kept under house arrest at his villa in Giza.

According to the official Egyptian position, Amer was rushed to hospital on 13 September 1967 in an attempt to save his life after he attempted suicide by swallowing "a large amount of poison pills" upon the arrival of Egyptian officers to question him. After surviving and being taken home, he managed to evade his guards and swallow more pills he kept hidden under an adhesive plaster on his leg. Later, Cairo radio announced his burial in his home village of Astal.

Another version of the circumstances surrounding Amer's death held that Amer was approached at his house on 13 September by high-ranking Egyptian officers and given a choice: to stand trial for treason, which would inevitably have ended with his conviction and execution, or to die an honourable death by taking poison. Amer chose the latter option and received a full military burial. Anwar Al Sadat, who later became President of Egypt, expressed his opinion that if he was in Amer's position, he would have done the same soon after the Six-Day War.

In September 2012, Amer's family filed a case to investigate his death. They claimed that he was murdered. Also, in a statement translated from Al-Masry Al-Youm published on 5 May 2015, the family's lawyer cited reports confirming that Amer's death was not self-inflicted, including an interview with Anwar Sadat's widow published on 26 April of that year.

== Foreign awards and honours ==
- Indonesia:
  - Star of the Republic of Indonesia, 2nd Class (1962)
- Soviet Union:
  - Recipient of the Hero of the Soviet Union (1964)
- Malaysia:
  - Honorary Grand Commander of the Order of the Defender of the Realm (SMN) - Tun (1965)
