= Vice President of Egypt =

Second-highest constitutional office of Egypt

Vice President of the Arab Republic of Egypt
- Presidential emblem

- Flag of Egypt
- Incumbent; Vacant since 14 August 2013
- Appointer: President
- Term length: No term limits
- Formation: 7 March 1958; 14 July 2013 (Interim); 23 April 2019
- First holder: Sabri al-Asali; Akram al-Hawrani; Abdel Latif Boghdadi; Abdel Hakim Amer
- Final holder: Mahmoud Mekki; Mohamed ElBaradei (Interim)
- Abolished: 26 December 2012; 18 January 2014 (Interim)

The vice president of the Arab Republic of Egypt is a senior official within the Egyptian government.

== History of the office ==
=== Before 1971 ===
In 1962, President Gamal Abdel Nasser instituted collective leadership in Egypt, separating the post of prime minister from that of president and establishing a presidential council to deal with all issues formerly considered presidential prerogatives. Five of the council's 11 members were vice-presidents of Egypt.

=== Under the 1971 Constitution ===
According to article 139 of the 1971 Constitution, the president "may appoint one or more Vice-Presidents define their jurisdiction and relieve them of their posts. The rules relating to the calling to account of the President of the Republic shall be applicable to the Vice-Presidents." The Constitution gave broad authority to the president to determine the number of vice-presidents, as well as their appointment, dismissal and duties of office.

After the 2011 amendments, the president should appointed a vice president 60 days after his inauguration.

=== Under the 2012 Constitution ===
The 2012 Constitution did not include the position of vice-president.

With the adoption of the 2012 Constitution on 26 December 2012, the office of vice-president was abolished. Mahmoud Mekki was the last person to hold the office before the adoption of the 2012 Constitution, having resigned on 22 December 2012.

=== 2013 coup d'état ===
After the overthrow of President Mohamed Morsi in the 2013 Egyptian coup d'état, the position of the vice-president was briefly restored (with extra-constitutional basic) by Acting President Adly Mansour, who appointed Mohamed ElBaradei to the post of acting vice-president on 7 July 2013. He was sworn in on 14 July. On 14 August 2013, following a violent crackdown by security forces on supporters of deposed President Morsi, in which more than 800 people were killed, ElBaradei resigned as acting vice president.

=== Under the 2014 Constitution ===
Much like the 2012 Constitution, until 2019, the 2014 Constitution also did not include the position of vice-president.

=== After 2019 constitutional amendments ===
The office has since been restored following a constitutional referendum. The president may appoint one or more vice presidents. The main duty of the vice president is to assist the president. As of April 2026, no new Vice President was appointed.

== List of officeholders ==
This list contains vice-presidents of United Arab Republic (1958–71, included Syria until the 1961 coup d'état) and Arab Republic of Egypt (1971–present).

No.	Portrait	Name (Birth–Death)	Term of office			Political party	President
No.	Portrait	Name (Birth–Death)	Took office	Left office	Time in office	Political party	President
United Arab Republic (22 February 1958 – 11 September 1971)
1		Sabri al-Asali صبري العسلي (1903–1976)	7 March 1958	7 October 1958	214 days	National Party	Gamal Abdel Nasser
1		Akram al-Hawrani أكرم الحوراني (1912–1996)	7 March 1958	19 September 1960	2 years, 196 days	Ba'ath Party (Syria Region)	Gamal Abdel Nasser
1		Abdel Latif Boghdadi عبد اللطيف البغدادي (1917–1999)	7 March 1958	23 March 1964	6 years, 16 days	National Union (until 1962)	Gamal Abdel Nasser
1		Abdel Latif Boghdadi عبد اللطيف البغدادي (1917–1999)	7 March 1958	23 March 1964	6 years, 16 days	Arab Socialist Union	Gamal Abdel Nasser
1		Abdel Hakim Amer محمد عبد الحكيم عامر (1919–1967)	7 March 1958	30 September 1965	7 years, 207 days	National Union (until 1962)	Gamal Abdel Nasser
1		Abdel Hakim Amer محمد عبد الحكيم عامر (1919–1967)	7 March 1958	30 September 1965	7 years, 207 days	Arab Socialist Union	Gamal Abdel Nasser
2		Nur al-Din Kahala نور الدين كحالة (1908–1965)	20 September 1960	18 October 1961	1 year, 28 days	National Union	Gamal Abdel Nasser
3		Abdul Hamid al-Sarraj عبد الحميد السراج (1925–2013)	16 August 1961	18 October 1961	63 days	National Union	Gamal Abdel Nasser
3		Kamal el-Din Hussein كمال الدين حسين (1921–1999)	16 August 1961	23 March 1964	2 years, 220 days	National Union (until 1962)	Gamal Abdel Nasser
3		Kamal el-Din Hussein كمال الدين حسين (1921–1999)	16 August 1961	23 March 1964	2 years, 220 days	Arab Socialist Union	Gamal Abdel Nasser
3		Zakaria Mohieddin زكريا محيى الدين (1918–2012)	16 August 1961	23 March 1964	2 years, 220 days	National Union (until 1962)	Gamal Abdel Nasser
3		Zakaria Mohieddin زكريا محيى الدين (1918–2012)	16 August 1961	23 March 1964	2 years, 220 days	Arab Socialist Union	Gamal Abdel Nasser
3		Hussein el-Shafei حسين محمود حسن الشافعي (1918–2005)	16 August 1961	30 September 1965	4 years, 45 days	National Union (until 1962)	Gamal Abdel Nasser
3		Hussein el-Shafei حسين محمود حسن الشافعي (1918–2005)	16 August 1961	30 September 1965	4 years, 45 days	Arab Socialist Union	Gamal Abdel Nasser
4		Anwar Sadat أنور السادات (1918–1981)	17 February 1964	26 March 1964	38 days	Arab Socialist Union	Gamal Abdel Nasser
4		Hassan Ibrahim حسن ابراهيم (1917–1990)	17 February 1964	27 January 1966	1 year, 344 days	Arab Socialist Union	Gamal Abdel Nasser
(3)		Zakaria Mohieddin زكريا محيى الدين (1918–2012)	1 October 1965	20 March 1968	2 years, 171 days	Arab Socialist Union	Gamal Abdel Nasser
5		Ali Sabri على صبرى (1920–1991)	1 October 1965	20 March 1968	2 years, 171 days	Arab Socialist Union	Gamal Abdel Nasser
(3)		Hussein el-Shafei حسين محمود حسن الشافعي (1918–2005)	20 March 1968	16 January 1973	4 years, 302 days	Arab Socialist Union	Gamal Abdel Nasser
(4)		Anwar Sadat أنور السادات (1918–1981)	19 December 1969	14 October 1970	299 days	Arab Socialist Union	Gamal Abdel Nasser
(5)		Ali Sabri على صبرى (1920–1991)	30 October 1970	2 May 1971	184 days	Arab Socialist Union	Anwar Sadat
Arab Republic of Egypt (11 September 1971 – present)
6		Mahmoud Fawzi محمود فوزى (1900–1981)	16 January 1972	18 September 1974	2 years, 245 days	Arab Socialist Union	Anwar Sadat
—	Vacant office (18 September 1974 – 16 April 1975)						Anwar Sadat
7		Hosni Mubarak حسنى مبارك (1928–2020)	16 April 1975	14 October 1981	6 years, 181 days	Arab Socialist Union (until 1978)	Anwar Sadat
7		Hosni Mubarak حسنى مبارك (1928–2020)	16 April 1975	14 October 1981	6 years, 181 days	National Democratic Party	
7		Hosni Mubarak حسنى مبارك (1928–2020)	16 April 1975	14 October 1981	6 years, 181 days	National Democratic Party	Sufi Abu Taleb; Interim president
—	Vacant office (14 October 1981 – 29 January 2011)						Hosni Mubarak
8		Omar Suleiman عمر سليمان (1936–2012)	29 January 2011	11 February 2011	13 days	Independent	Hosni Mubarak
—	Vacant office (11 February 2011 – 12 August 2012)						SCAF (Note: The Supreme Council of the Armed Forces (SCAF) ruled Egypt until 30 June 2012.)
—	Vacant office (11 February 2011 – 12 August 2012)						Mohamed Morsi (Note: Mohamed Morsi was the president of Egypt from 30 June 2012 until the coup d'état on 3 July 2013.)
9		Mahmoud Mekki محمود مكي (born 1954)	12 August 2012	22 December 2012	132 days	Independent	Mohamed Morsi
—	Vacant office (22 December 2012 – 26 December 2012)						Mohamed Morsi
—	Post abolished (26 December 2012 – 14 July 2013)						Mohamed Morsi
—		Mohamed ElBaradei محمد البرادعي (born 1942) (Interim)	14 July 2013	14 August 2013	31 days	Constitution Party	Adly Mansour (Note: Adly Mansour was the interim president of Egypt from 4 July 2013 to 8 June 2014.); Interim president
—	Vacant office (14 August 2013 – 18 January 2014)						Adly Mansour; Interim president
—	Post abolished (18 January 2014 – 23 April 2019)						Abdel Fattah el-Sisi (Note: Abdel Fattah el-Sisi is the president of Egypt since 8 June 2014.)
—	Vacant office (23 April 2019 – present)						Abdel Fattah el-Sisi
