= Aziz Sedky =

Egyptian politician and engineer (1920–2008)

- عزيز صدقي
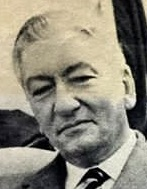
- Sedky in 1972

36th Prime Minister of Egypt
- In office 16 January 1972 – 26 March 1973
- President: Anwar Sadat
- Preceded by: Mahmoud Fawzi
- Succeeded by: Anwar Sadat

Personal details
- Born: 1 July 1920 Cairo, Egypt
- Died: 25 January 2008 (aged 87) Paris, France
- Party: Arab Socialist Union
- Spouse: Leila Sioufi

Aziz Sedky (Arabic: عزيز صدقي, IPA: [ʕæˈziːz ˈsedʔi]; 1 July 1920 – 25 January 2008) was an Egyptian politician and engineer. Sedky served as the Prime Minister of Egypt from 16 January 1972 until 26 March 1973. He was nicknamed the "father of Egyptian industry."

== Early life and education ==
Aziz Sedky was born in Cairo, Egypt, on 1 July 1920. He graduated with a degree in engineering from Cairo University in 1944. He went on to earn a doctorate in economic planning from Harvard University in Cambridge, Massachusetts.

== Career ==
Sedky was appointed as a technical adviser to the Egyptian prime minister's office in 1955, a few years after the Egyptian Revolution of 1952. He next served as a full-time member of the services board until 1956.

In 1956, Sedky was appointed as minister of industry by the President Gamal Abdel Nasser. Among Sedky's tasks as minister was the supervision of an industrialization program, which was financed by the Soviet Union. The Soviets were, at the time, an important ally of the Egyptian government. Sedky launched a five-year industrialization plan in 1957. This initiative was later merged into a "general five-year development plan", which lasted from 1961 until 1965. He was a member of the Arab Socialist Union from 1962 and became part of its secret unit, the Socialist Vanguard (Arabic: al-Tanzim al-Tali‘i), which was also called the Vanguard Organization, in 1963 when the unit was established.

Sedky was promoted as deputy prime minister responsible for industry and mineral resources in 1964. Simultaneously, he also became the minister of petroleum and mineral resources in 1964 as well. In November 1970, Sedky was also named as the deputy prime minister for production and trade.

Sedky was appointed prime minister on 16 January 1972, following the resignation of Mahmoud Fawzi. He remained in office until 26 March 1973 when he was replaced by Anwar Sadat in the post.

== Death ==
Aziz Sedky died at the age of 87 on 25 January 2008, at the Hospital Européen Georges Pompidou in Paris, France.

Political offices
Preceded by Mahmoud Fawzi	Prime Minister of Egypt; 16 January 1972 – 26 March 1973	Succeeded by Anwar Sadat
