= Hussein el-Shafei =

Vice President of Egypt (1961–1965; 1968–1975)

Hussein el-Shafei ON
- حسين الشافعي
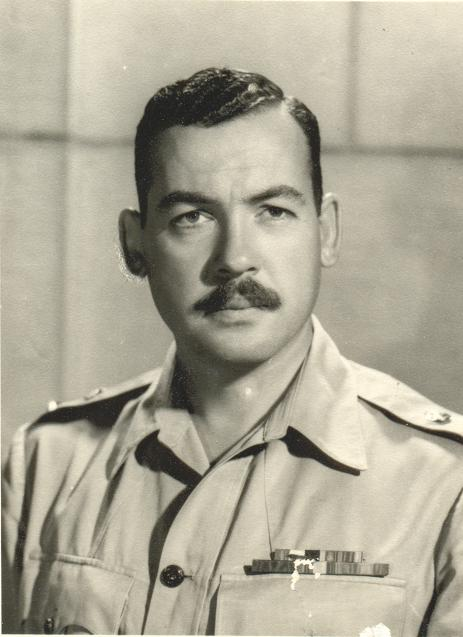

3rd Vice President of Egypt
- In office 20 March 1968 – 16 April 1975
- President: Gamal Abdel Nasser; Anwar Sadat
- Preceded by: Ali Sabri
- Succeeded by: Hosni Mubarak
- In office 16 August 1961 – 30 September 1965
- President: Gamal Abdel Nasser
- Preceded by: Nur al-Din Kahala
- Succeeded by: Ali Sabri

Minister of Defense
- In office 17 April 1954 – 31 August 1954
- President: Gamal Abdel Nasser
- Preceded by: Abdel Latif Boghdadi
- Succeeded by: Abdel Hakim Amer

Personal details
- Born: 8 February 1918 Tanta, Sultanate of Egypt
- Died: 18 November 2005 (aged 87) Cairo, Egypt

Military service
- Allegiance: Kingdom of Egypt; Egypt
- Branch/service: Egyptian Army
- Years of service: 1938–1975
- Rank: Colonel
- Unit: Cavalry
- Battles/wars: Second World War; 1948 Arab-Israeli War; Suez Crisis; Six-Day War; 6th October 1973 War

Hussein Mahmoud Hassan el-Shafei (Arabic: حسين محمود حسن الشافعي; 8 February 1918 – 18 November 2005) was an Egyptian military officer who was a member of the Free Officers Movement and served as the third vice president of Egypt from 1961 to 1965 and from 1968 to 1975 under two Egyptian presidents, Gamal Abdel Nasser and Anwar Sadat. He was one of the nine men who had constituted themselves as the committee of the Free Officers movement and led the country's cavalry corps during the uprising, and was one of only three last-surviving members of the Revolutionary Command Council at the time of his death.

== Early life and education ==
Born in Tanta in 1918, el-Shafei graduated from the Egyptian Military Academy in 1938.

== Career ==
El-Shafei was appointed minister of war in 1954 and served as Egypt's minister of labor and social affairs during Egypt's merger with Syria. He served as vice-president under Gamal Abdel Nasser in 1961.

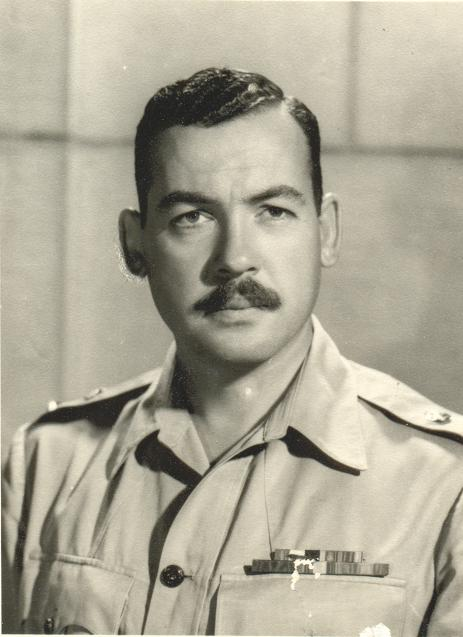
Hussein el-Shafei

During his tenure as minister of social affairs, el-Shafei introduced social insurance reforms considered radical at the time, including pensions to widows. His Winter Charity campaign provided Egypt's poor with basic necessities. Some Egyptian celebrities took part in the "mercy trains" which delivered the goods, including actress Faten Hamama. Anwar Sadat appointed el-Shafei as vice-president of Egypt's new government in 1971 and he was succeeded by Hosni Mubarak in April 1975.

== Death ==
El-Shafei died on 18 November 2005. Mubarak was among the senior officials at el-Shafei's state funeral.

== Honours ==
- Egypt: Grand Cordon of the Order of the Nile

=== Foreign honours ===
- Poland: Grand Cross of the Order of Polonia Restituta (1965)
- Malaysia: Honorary Grand Commander of the Order of the Defender of the Realm (1965)

== See also ==
- 1952 Revolution

Sporting positions
Preceded by Abdel Rahman Amin	President of the Egyptian Olympic Committee; 1960–1962	Succeeded by Muhammad Talaat Khayri
