= Ali Sabri =

Vice President of Egypt (1965–1968; 1970–1971)

- علي صبري
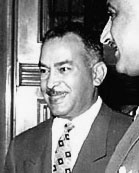
- Sabri in 1966

5th Vice President of Egypt
- In office 30 October 1970 – 2 May 1971
- President: Anwar Sadat
- Preceded by: Anwar Sadat
- Succeeded by: Mahmoud Fawzi
- In office 3 October 1965 – 20 March 1968
- President: Gamal Abdel Nasser
- Preceded by: Anwar Sadat
- Succeeded by: Hussein el-Shafei

32nd Prime Minister of Egypt
- In office 29 September 1962 – 3 October 1965
- President: Gamal Abdel Nasser
- Preceded by: Gamal Abdel Nasser
- Succeeded by: Zakaria Mohieddin

Director of the Egyptian General Intelligence Directorate
- In office 1956–1957
- President: Gamal Abdel Nasser
- Preceded by: Zakaria Mohieddin
- Succeeded by: Salah Nasr

Personal details
- Born: Ali Sabri; 30 August 1920 Cairo, Sultanate of Egypt
- Died: 3 August 1991 (aged 70) Cairo, Egypt
- Profession: Aristocrat, Military Officer, Politician, Intelligence Officer

Military service
- Allegiance: Egypt
- Branch/service: Egyptian Army
- Rank: Marshal

Ali Sabri (Arabic: علي صبري, IPA: [ˈʕæli ˈsˤɑbɾi]; 30 August 1920 – 3 August 1991) was an Egyptian politician of Turkish origin who served as the fifth vice president of Egypt from 1965 to 1968 and from 1970 to 1971.

== Family background ==
His parents, Dewlet Shamsi (mother) and Abbas-Baligh Sabri (father) were of Turkish-Circassian descent and belonged to the privileged class.

Ali Sabri was a grandson of nationalist Amin Shamsi Pasha, a member of the General Assembly and Provincial Council who in 1881-82 was a principal financial backer of Ahmed Urabi Pasha. Following the failure of what historian term the "Urabi Rebellion" of 1882, Khedive Tewfik imprisoned Shamsi Pasha later releasing him on a hefty bail. He resumed his seat at the General Assembly until his death.

Sabri was also a nephew of Ali Shamsi Pasha, co-founder of the Wafd Party and a several-time minister during the reign of Fuad I of Egypt later to become the first Egyptian to head of the National Bank of Egypt which acted as the country's Central Bank.

One of Ali Sabri's paternal grand-uncles was Mohammed Faizi Pasha, a director-general of the Awqaf Department during the reign of Khedive Abbas Hilmi II.

The trilingual Ali Sabri, along with his three brothers and one sister, was raised in the then-predominantly aristocratic and European Cairo suburb of Maadi and was an active member of its Sporting Club's tennis and swimming teams.

== Egyptian revolution and premiership ==
Sabri was one of the second row of 1952 revolution officers, he was the head of Egyptian General Intelligence Directorate from 1956 to 1957. He was the 32nd Prime Minister of Egypt from September 1962 to October 1965.

When Gamal Abdel Nasser died in 1970, Anwar Sadat was regarded as Gamal Abdel Nasser's most likely successor, but Sabri was regarded as the next most likely. Both Anwar Sadat and Sabri had heart attacks which they survived at Gamal Abdel Nasser's funeral.

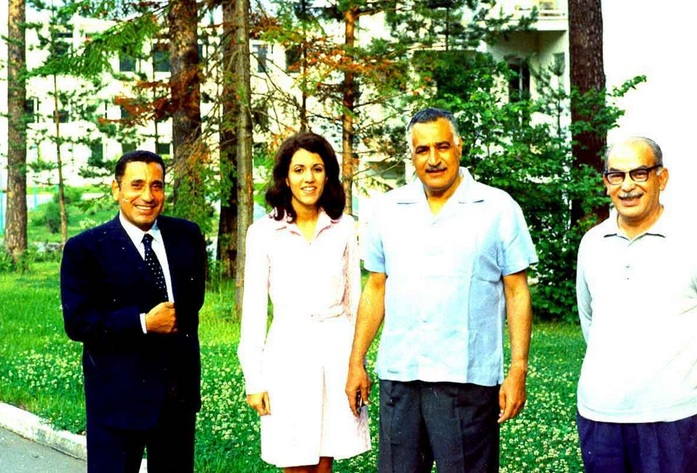
Sabri (first from right) with President Gamal Abdel Nasser, daughter Hoda Abdel Nasser and Mohamed Hassanein Heikal, 1966

Sabri was the vice-president and regarded as the no. 2 figure in Anwar Sadat's government. However shortly after Anwar Sadat came to power he was the most notable casualty of Anwar Sadat's "Corrective Revolution", and was imprisoned.

Regarded as a diehard socialist, he was often criticized for his upper-class background. Ali Sabri died in Cairo on 3 August 1991, aged 70.

== Honour ==
=== Foreign honour ===
- Malaysia:
  - Honorary Grand Commander of the Order of the Defender of the Realm (SMN (K)) - Tun (1965)
- Czechoslovak Socialist Republic:
  - Order of the White Lion (25 September 1964)

Political offices
Preceded by Gamal Abdel Nasser	Prime Minister of Egypt; 1962–1965	Succeeded by Zakaria Mohieddin
Preceded by Anwar Sadat	Vice-President of Egypt; 1965–1968	Succeeded by Mahmoud Fawzi
