= Mahmoud Fawzi =

Vice President of Egypt from 1972 to 1974

- محمود فوزي
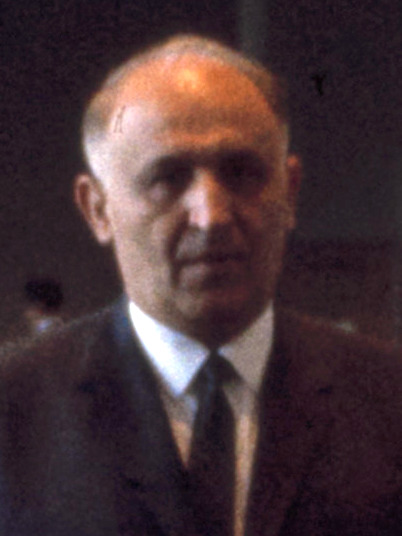
- Fawzi in 1967

6th Vice President of Egypt
- In office 16 January 1972 – 18 September 1974
- President: Anwar Sadat
- Preceded by: Ali Sabri
- Succeeded by: Hosni Mubarak

35th Prime Minister of Egypt
- In office 21 October 1970 – 16 January 1972
- President: Gamal Abdel Nasser; Anwar Sadat
- Preceded by: Gamal Abdel Nasser
- Succeeded by: Aziz Sedki

Personal details
- Born: Mahmoud Fawzi; 19 September 1900 Monufia Governorate, Khedivate of Egypt
- Died: 21 June 1981 (aged 80) Cairo, Egypt
- Party: Arab Socialist Union
- Profession: Diplomat, Politician
- Awards: Honorary Commander of the Order of the Defender of the Realm (PMN (K)) - Tan Sri (1965)

Mahmoud Fawzi (Arabic: محمود فوزي, IPA: [mæħˈmuːd ˈfæwzi]; 19 September 1900 – 12 June 1981) was an Egyptian diplomat and political figure who served as the 35th prime minister of Egypt from 1970 to 1972 and the sixth vice president of Egypt from 1972 to 1974.

== Biography ==
Fawzi was born in a village near Quwaysina, Monufia Governorate. His father was a graduate of Dar al'Ulum and the Shari'a Judges School. He studied law at the University of Cairo. He did his postgraduate studies at the Universities of Liverpool, Columbia, and Rome, and received a PhD in criminal law in 1926.

He served in many diplomatic posts as a young man, including the Egyptian Consul in the Egyptian Consulate in Kobe, Japan, in the early 1930s, beginning in 1926. In 1942 he was appointed Egyptian consul-general in Jerusalem. He became Egyptian representative to the United Nations in 1946 and ambassador to the United Kingdom in 1952. In late 1952 he became foreign minister of Egypt under its new leader, Gamal Abdel Nasser. Fawzi was appointed largely because of his fluency in languages, and was known to avoid involvement in politics, always remaining a diplomat. Fawzi served as foreign minister of Egypt until 1958 when the United Arab Republic, a union between Egypt and Syria was formed. Fawzi served as foreign minister of the United Arab Republic until its collapse in 1961. He remained in office until 1964. After that he remained a close advisor to Nasser on foreign affairs. Upon Nasser's death in 1970, Fawzi was appointed prime minister by his successor, Anwar Sadat, as a compromise civilian candidate. Fawzi served as prime minister until January 1972 and then served as vice-president of Egypt until his retirement in 1974. He wrote a book entitled "Suez War" about the 1956 crisis with Israel over the Suez Canal and it was published after his death in 1981.

== Honour ==
=== Foreign honour ===
- Malaysia:
  - Honorary Commander of the Order of the Defender of the Realm (PMN (K)) - Tan Sri (1965)

Diplomatic posts
Preceded by Amr Pasha	Ambassador of Egypt to the United Kingdom; 1952	Succeeded by Abdel Rahman Hakky
Political offices
Preceded by Ahmed Farrag Tayei	Foreign Minister of Egypt; 1952 – 1964	Succeeded by Mahmoud Riad
Vacant Title last held by Gamal Abdel Nasser	Prime Minister of Egypt; 1970 – 1972	Succeeded by Aziz Sedki
