= Zakaria Mohieddin =

Prime Minister of Egypt from 1965 to 1966

- زكريا محيي الدين
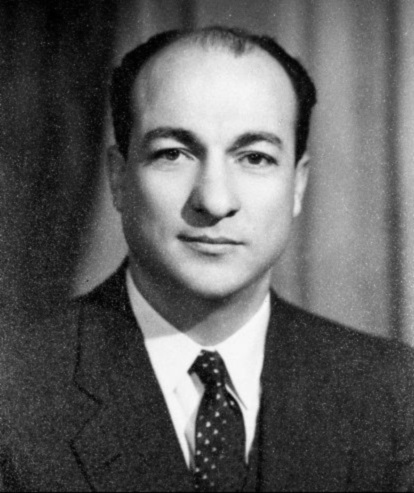
- Mohieddin in 1953

33rd Prime Minister of Egypt
- In office 3 October 1965 – 10 September 1966
- President: Gamal Abdel Nasser
- Preceded by: Ali Sabri
- Succeeded by: Muhammad Sedki Sulayman

3rd Vice President of Egypt
- In office 1961–1968
- President: Gamal Abdel Nasser
- Succeeded by: Ali Sabri

Member of the Egyptian Revolutionary Command Council
- In office 1952–1956
- President: Muhammad Naguib; Gamal Abdel Nasser

Director of the Egyptian General Intelligence Directorate
- In office 1952–1955
- President: Muhammad Naguib; Gamal Abdel Nasser
- Succeeded by: Ali Sabri

President of Egypt (acting)
- In office 9 June 1967 – 11 June 1967

Minister of Interior
- In office 1 October 1965 – 10 September 1966
- Prime Minister: Himself
- Preceded by: Abdel Azim Fahmy
- Succeeded by: Sharawi Gomaa
- In office 18 October 1961 – 29 September 1962
- Prime Minister: Gamal Abdel Nasser
- Preceded by: Abbas Radwan
- Succeeded by: Abdel Azim Fahmy
- In office 6 October 1953 – 16 August 1961
- Prime Minister: Muhammad Naguib; Gamal Abdel Nasser; Muhammad Naguib; Gamal Abdel Nasser
- Preceded by: Gamal Abdel Nasser
- Succeeded by: Abbas Radwan

Personal details
- Born: 5 July 1918 Qalyubiyya Governorate, Sultanate of Egypt
- Died: 15 May 2012 (aged 93) Cairo, Egypt
- Profession: Military officer; politician; intelligence agent
- Awards: Mehmet Ali golden award

Military service
- Allegiance: Egypt
- Branch/service: Egyptian Army
- Years of service: 1938 – 1956
- Rank: Lieutenant Colonel
- Battles/wars: 1947–1949 Palestine war

Zakaria Mohieddin (Arabic: زكريا محيي الدين, IPA: [zækæˈɾejjæ ˈmoħj edˈdiːn]; 5 July 1918 – 15 May 2012) was an Egyptian military officer, politician who served as the 3rd prime minister of Egypt and head of the first Intelligence body in Egypt, the Egyptian General Intelligence Directorate.

== Overview ==
Mohieddin attended the Military College in 1938 and was a Staff College graduate in 1948. He was the professional army professor of tactics in the Officers Military College from 1940 to 1943 and again from 1950 to 1951. He was also the professor of tactics in the Officers Staff College from 1951 to 1952.

In 1967 following the defeat of Egypt in the Six-Day War, Mohieddin was appointed by president Gamal Abdel Nasser to take over position of president after Nasser's resignation, an appointment he refused. In 1968, Mohieddin resigned from all positions and quit public life. The same year he was arrested due to his alleged involvement in the coup plans against Nasser.

As of 2005, after the death of Hussein El-Shafei and until his own death in 2012, Mohieddin and his first cousin Khaled Mohieddin were the last two surviving members of the Revolutionary Command Council.

On 15 May 2012, Mohieddin died at the age of 93.

== Military ==
Mohieddin had various assignments within the army. He served with the Egyptian army in Sudan. In 1948, he was the chief of staff of the first brigade which was later besieged at Faluja. One of his outstanding achievements in 1948 was to go back to the besieged brigade, infiltrating enemy lines from Rafah to Faluja. He was rewarded for his bravery at the end of the war with the Mehmet Ali golden award for valour and excellence in duty in the field in Palestine. In 1952, he prepared strategy for army movement and was in charge of operation that led to success of the movement.

== Political ==
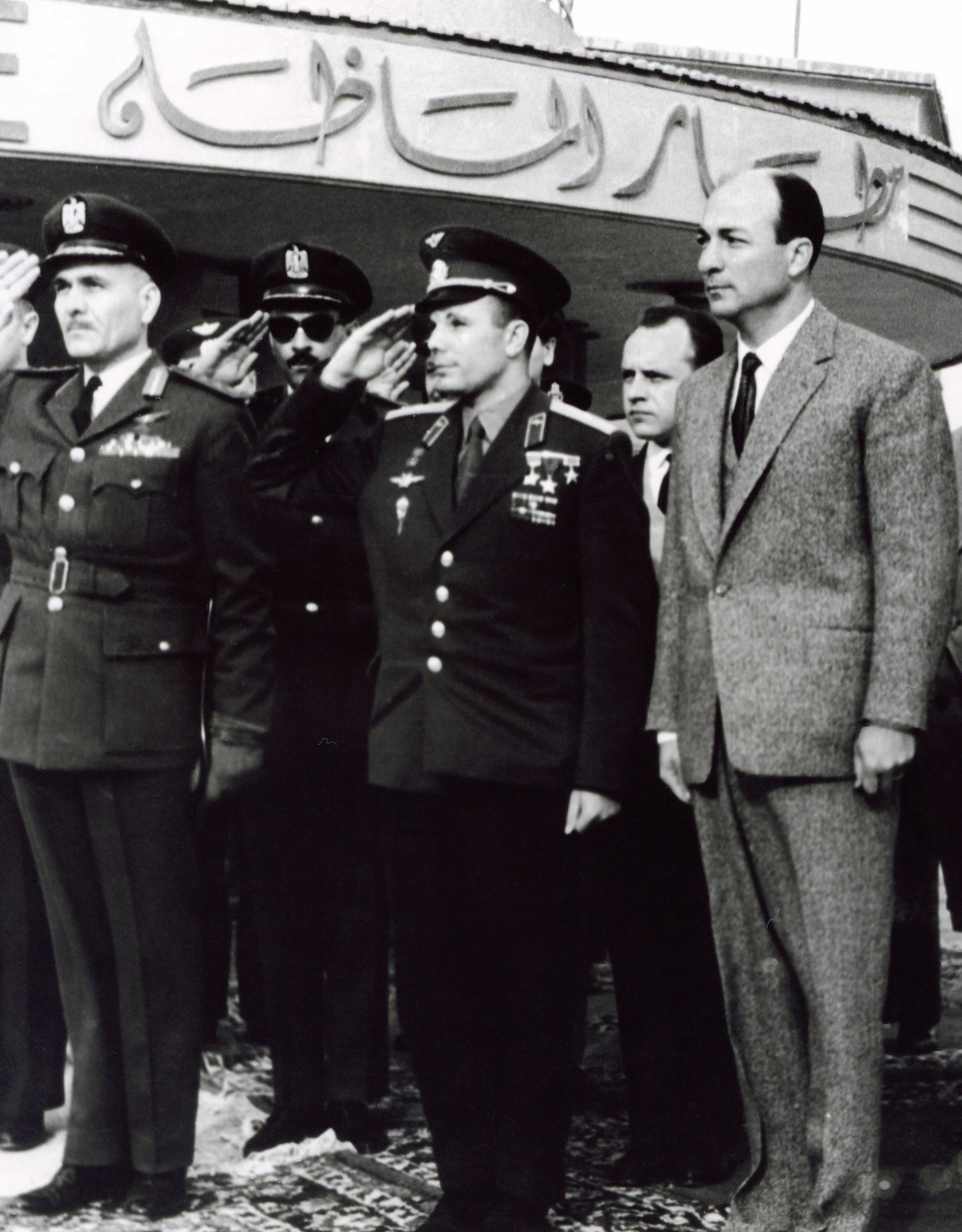
Zakaria Mohieddin and Yuri Gagarin - the first Human in Space, Cairo Almaza Air Base, February 2, 1962

=== Positions held ===
- 1952–1956 - Member of Egyptian Revolutionary Command Council
- 1952–1955 - In charge of the first Intelligence body the Egyptian General Intelligence Directorate
- 1953–1958 - Minister of Interior
- 1958–1961 - Central Minister of Interior for Egypt and Syria during U.A.R.
- 1961–1962 - Minister of Interior
- 1961–1968 - Vice President of Egypt.
- 1965–1966 - Prime Minister and Minister of Interior.

=== Committees and boards ===
- Head of the High Commission for the High Dam
- Head of Egyptian Rowing Federation (1960–68)
- Head of Egyptian Greek Friendship Committee (1958–68)
- Member of the Board of the Officers Club (1951–52)
- Member of the High Committee of Socialist Arab Unity (the leading party or the only political party)
- Member of National Defense Committee.

=== Conferences attended ===
- Egypt delegation to UN - 1960
- African conference Addis Ababa - 1964
- Arab conference Casablanca - 1965
- Bandong - 1965
- Signed Nile treaty with Sudan

== Death ==
Mohieddin died on the morning of 15 May 2012 at the age of 93. His funeral was held at the Aal Rashdan Mosque in Nasr City, which is associated with the Egyptian military. In addition to his family, several military and political figures attended the procession, including Sami Hafez Anan, Hussein Tantawi, Hamdeen Sabahi, Ahmed Shafiq, Amr Moussa and Kamal el-Ganzouri.

== Honours ==
=== Foreign honours ===
- Poland:
  - Grand Cross of the Order of Polonia Restituta (1965)
- Malaysia:
  - Honorary Grand Commander of the Order of the Defender of the Realm (SMN (K)) - Tun (1965)

Political offices
Preceded by None	Vice-President of Egypt; 1961-1968	Succeeded by Ali Sabri
Preceded by Ali Sabri	Prime Minister of Egypt; 1965-1966	Succeeded by Muhammad Sedki Sulayman
