= Anwar Sadat =

President of Egypt from 1970 to 1981

His Excellency Anwar Sadat
- أنور السادات
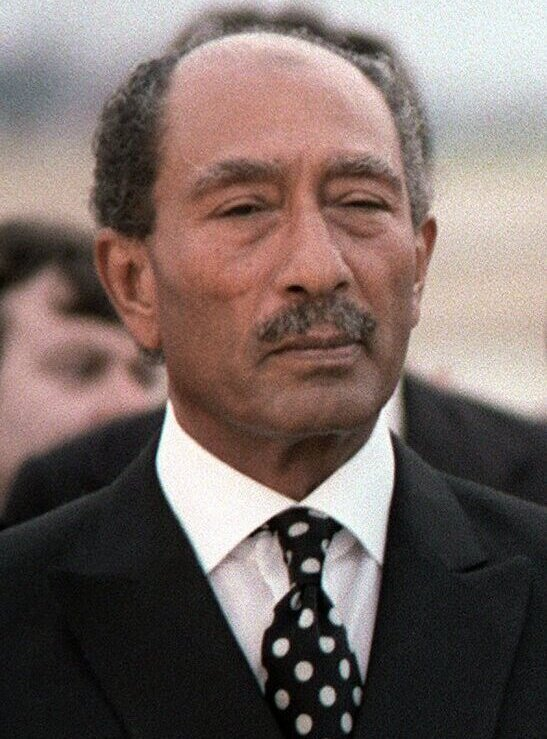
- Sadat in 1980

3rd President of Egypt
- In office 28 September 1970 (Note: Acting: 28 September – 15 October 1970) – 6 October 1981
- Prime Minister: See list: Mahmoud Fawzi (1970–1972); Aziz Sedky (1972–1973); Himself (1973–1974); Abdel Aziz Mohamed Hegazy (1974–1975); Mamdouh Salem (1975–1978); Mustafa Khalil (1978–1980); Himself (1980–1981)
- Vice President: See list: Hussein el-Shafei (1970–1973); Ali Sabri (1970–1971); Mahmoud Fawzi (1972–1974); Hosni Mubarak (1975–1981)
- Preceded by: Gamal Abdel Nasser
- Succeeded by: Sufi Abu Taleb (acting); Hosni Mubarak

37th Prime Minister of Egypt
- In office 15 May 1980 – 6 October 1981
- President: Himself
- Preceded by: Mustafa Khalil
- Succeeded by: Hosni Mubarak
- In office 26 March 1973 – 25 September 1974
- President: Himself
- Preceded by: Aziz Sedky
- Succeeded by: Abdel Aziz Mohamed Hegazy

4th Vice President of Egypt
- In office 19 December 1969 – 14 October 1970
- President: Gamal Abdel Nasser
- Preceded by: Hussein el-Shafei
- Succeeded by: Ali Sabri
- In office 17 February 1964 – 26 March 1964
- President: Gamal Abdel Nasser
- Preceded by: Hussein el-Shafei
- Succeeded by: Zakaria Mohieddin

2nd Speaker of the National Assembly of Egypt
- In office 21 July 1960 – 20 January 1969
- President: Gamal Abdel Nasser
- Preceded by: Abdel Latif Boghdadi
- Succeeded by: Mohamed Labib Skokeir

Personal details
- Born: Muhammad Anwar es-Sadat; 25 December 1918 Mit Abu El Kom, Monufia, Egypt
- Died: 6 October 1981 (aged 62) Nasr City, Cairo, Egypt
- Cause of death: Assassination
- Resting place: Unknown Soldier Memorial
- Party: National Democratic Party
- Other political affiliations: Arab Socialist Union; National Union; Young Egypt Party
- Spouses: Eqbal Afifi (separated); Jehan Sadat (m. 1949)
- Children: 7
- Education: Egyptian Military Academy
- Awards: Nobel Peace Prize (1978); Congressional Gold Medal (posthumous, 2026)

Military service
- Allegiance: Egypt
- Branch/service: (Egypt) Egyptian Army
- Years of service: 1938–1952
- Rank: Colonel (active) Field Marshal (honorary)
- Anwar Sadat's voice Sadat on Egypt–United States relations Recorded 6 August 1981

Muhammad Anwar es-Sadat (Note: /səˈdæt/, UK also /sæˈdæt/, US also /səˈdɑːt/; Arabic: أنور السادات) (25 December 1918 – 6 October 1981) was an Egyptian politician and military officer who was the third president of Egypt from 1970 until his assassination in 1981. A former member of the Free Officers movement, Sadat was vice president under Gamal Abdel Nasser on two occasions and assumed the office on Nasser's death in 1970.

In his 11 years as president, he changed Egypt's trajectory, departing from many political and economic tenets of Nasserism, reinstituting a multi-party system, and launching the Infitah economic policy. As President, he led Egypt in the October war of 1973 to regain Egypt's Sinai Peninsula, which Israel had occupied since the Six-Day War of 1967, making him a hero in Egypt and, for a time, the wider Arab world. Afterwards, he engaged in negotiations with Israel, culminating in the Camp David Accords and the Egypt–Israel peace treaty.

Although reaction to the treaty – which resulted in the return of Sinai to Egypt – was generally favorable among Egyptians, it was rejected by the country's Muslim Brotherhood and the left, which felt Sadat had abandoned efforts to ensure a State of Palestine. With the exception of Sudan, the Arab world and the Palestine Liberation Organization (PLO) strongly opposed Sadat's efforts to make a separate peace with Israel without prior consultations with the Arab states. His refusal to reconcile with them over the Palestinian issue resulted in Egypt being suspended from the Arab League from 1979 to 1989. The peace treaty was also one of the primary factors that led to his assassination; on 6 October 1981, militants led by Khalid Al-Islambuli opened fire on Sadat with automatic rifles during the 6 October parade in Cairo, killing him.

== Early life and revolutionary activities ==
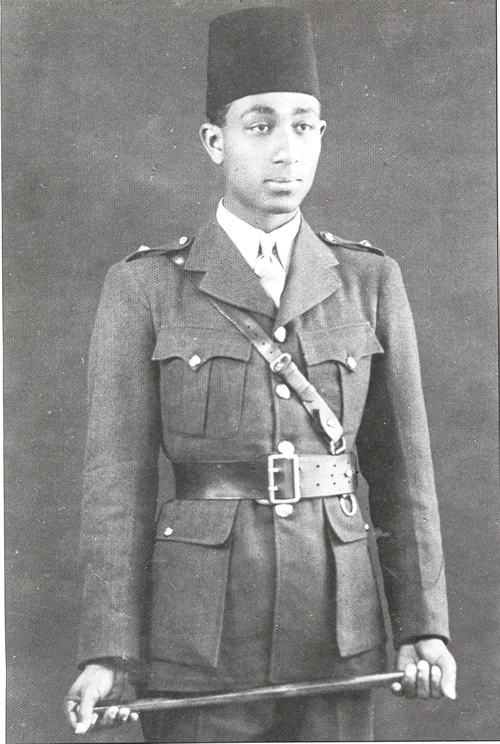
Sadat graduating from the military college in 1938

Anwar Sadat was born on 25 December 1918 in Mit Abu El Kom, part of Monufia Governorate in what was then the Sultanate of Egypt, to a poor family. He had 14 siblings. One of his brothers, Atef Sadat, later became a pilot and was killed in action in 1973 during the Yom Kippur War. His mother, Sit Al-Berain, was born to an Egyptian mother and a Sudanese father. His Egyptian father, Anwar Mohammed El Sadat, met Al-Berain while he was posted in Egyptian-controlled Sudan as a medical officer, and returned with her to his hometown of El Kom. His father named him after Enver Pasha, who was lauded as the "Hero of Freedom" by the peoples of the Ottoman Empire for his role in the Young Turk Revolution.

He graduated from the Royal Military Academy in Cairo, the capital of what was then the Kingdom of Egypt, in 1938 and was appointed to the Signal Corps. He entered the army as a second lieutenant and was posted to the Anglo-Egyptian Sudan (the Sudan being a condominium under joint British and Egyptian rule at the time). There, he met Gamal Abdel Nasser, and along with several other junior officers they formed the Free Officers, an organization committed to overthrowing British rule in Egypt and eliminating state corruption.

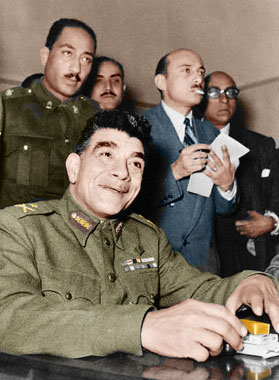
Sadat with Mohamed Naguib, 1952

During World War II, Sadat, a member of the fascist and ultranationalist Young Egypt Party, collaborated with Nazi Germany in Egypt as part of Operation Salam. There were meetings and talk amongst some pro-Axis junior officers of a potential revolt, and Sadat later said that he'd wanted to make Egypt "a second Iraq". After the Abdeen Palace incident, Sadat furthered his plans for a coup, but Muslim Brotherhood leader Hassan al-Banna declined to support the plot. He then met with two German agents in Cairo to discuss his plan, but was arrested and imprisoned for much of the war. By the end of the conflict, Sadat had already met with the secret society that decided to assassinate Amin Osman, Minister of Finance in the Wafd Party government, and the head of the Egyptian-British Friendship Society, due to his strong sympathies towards the British. Osman was assassinated in January 1946. Following the assassination of Amin Osman, Sadat returned and was sent to prison.

While in Qarmidan prison, Sadat faced solitary confinement. However, despite being the first accused in the Hussein Tawfiq case, Sadat escaped without leaving behind any evidence of criminality. Salah Zulfikar, then a young police officer, at that time was the officer in charge in the prison. He believed in his heart of Sadat's heroism and that he played a patriotic role towards his country and that he was convicted and imprisoned because of his love for his country. Zulfikar brought with him food, newspapers and cigarettes and helped his family a lot in obtaining visitor permits to check on him. Anwar Sadat was active in many political movements, including the Muslim Brotherhood, the fascist Young Egypt Party, the pro-Axis and pro-Royalist Iron Guard of Egypt, and the secret military group called the Free Officers. Along with his fellow Free Officers, Sadat participated in the military coup that launched the Egyptian Revolution of 1952, which overthrew King Farouk I on 23 July of that year. Sadat gave the first statement of the revolution over the radio to the Egyptian people.

== During Nasser's presidency ==
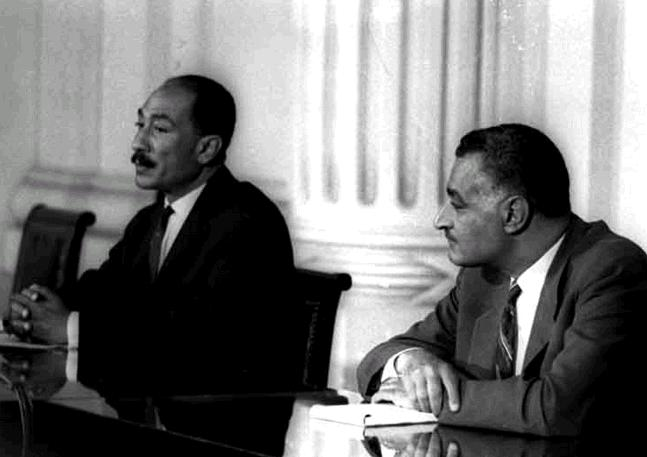
With Nasser in the National Assembly, May 1964

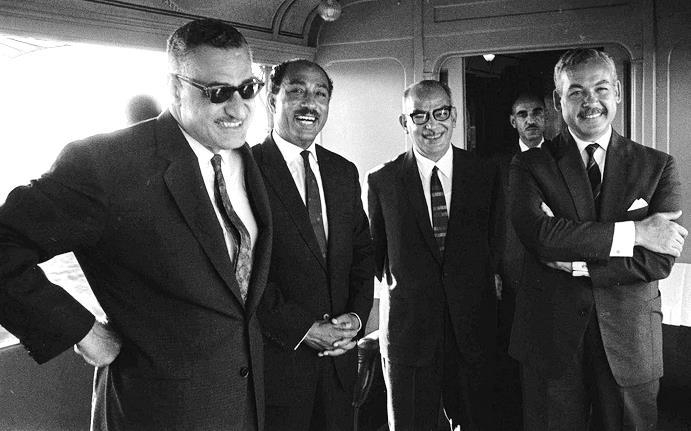
Top Egyptian leaders of the Arab Socialist Union in Alexandria. From left to right: President Gamal Abdel Nasser, Sadat, ASU head Ali Sabri, and Vice President Hussein el-Shafei, August 1968

During the presidency of Gamal Abdel Nasser, Sadat was appointed minister of State in 1954. He was also appointed editor of the newly founded daily Al Gomhuria. In 1959, he assumed the position of secretary to the National Union. Sadat was the 2nd president of the National Assembly (1960–1968) and then Vice President of Egypt and member of the presidential council in 1964. He was reappointed as vice president again in December 1969.

== Presidency ==
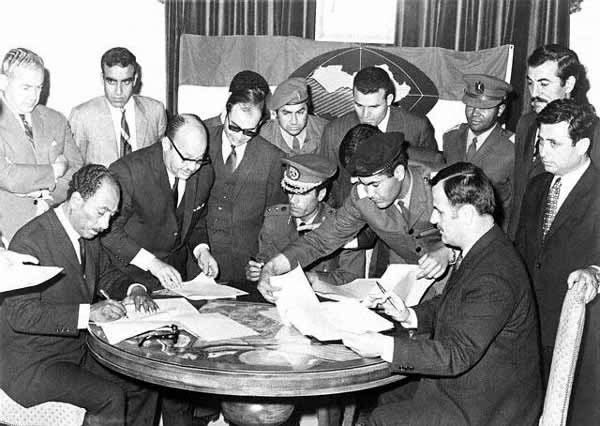
Sadat (sitting on the left side), Hafez al-Assad (sitting on the right side) and Muammar Gaddafi (sitting in the centre) signing the Federation of Arab Republics in Benghazi, Libya, on April 18, 1971

Some of the major events of Sadat's presidency were his "Corrective Revolution" to consolidate power in 1971, the break with Egypt's long-time ally and aid-giver the USSR, the Yom Kippur War with Israel, the Camp David Accords and the Egypt–Israel peace treaty, the "opening up" (or Infitah) of Egypt's economy, and lastly his assassination in 1981.

Sadat succeeded Nasser as president after the latter's death in October 1970. Sadat's presidency was widely expected to be short-lived. Viewing him as having been little more than a puppet of the former president, Nasser's supporters in government settled on Sadat as someone they could manipulate easily. Sadat surprised everyone with a series of astute political moves by which he was able to retain the presidency and emerge as a leader in his own right.

On 15 May 1971, Sadat announced his corrective revolution, purging the government, political and security establishments of the most ardent Nasserists. Sadat encouraged the emergence of an Islamist movement, which had been suppressed by Nasser. Believing Islamists to be socially conservative he gave them "considerable cultural and ideological autonomy" in exchange for political support.

In 1971, as part of the Jarring Mission, three years into the War of Attrition in the Suez Canal zone, Sadat endorsed in a letter the peace proposals of UN negotiator Gunnar Jarring, which seemed to lead to a full peace with Israel on the basis of Israel's withdrawal to its pre-war borders. This peace initiative failed as neither Israel nor the United States of America accepted the terms as discussed then.

=== Corrective Revolution ===
Shortly after taking office, Sadat shocked many Egyptians by dismissing and imprisoning two of the most powerful figures in the regime, Vice President Ali Sabri, who had close ties with Soviet officials, and Sharawi Gomaa, the Interior Minister, who controlled the secret police.

Sadat's rising popularity would accelerate after he cut back the powers of the hated secret police, expelled Soviet military from the country and reformed the Egyptian army for a renewed confrontation with Israel.

=== Yom Kippur War ===
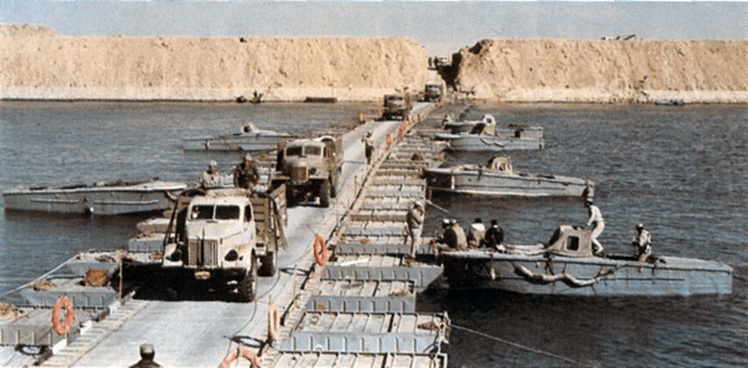
Egyptian vehicles crossing the Suez Canal on October 7, 1973, during the Yom Kippur War

On 6 October 1973, in conjunction with Hafez al-Assad of Syria, Sadat launched the October War, also known as the Yom Kippur War (and less commonly as the Ramadan War), a surprise attack against the Israeli forces occupying the Egyptian Sinai Peninsula, and the Syrian Golan Heights in an attempt to retake these respective Egyptian and Syrian territories that had been occupied by Israel since the Six Day War six years earlier. The Egyptian and Syrian performance in the initial stages of the war astonished both Israel, and the Arab World. The most striking achievement (Operation Badr, also known as The Crossing) was the Egyptian military's advance approximately 15 km into the occupied Sinai Peninsula after penetrating and largely destroying the Bar Lev Line. This line was popularly thought to have been an impregnable defensive chain.

As the war progressed, three divisions of the Israeli army led by General Ariel Sharon had crossed the Suez Canal, trying to encircle first the Egyptian Second Army. Although this failed, prompted by an agreement between the United States of America and the Soviet Union, the United Nations Security Council passed Resolution 338 on 22 October 1973, calling for an immediate ceasefire. Although agreed upon, the ceasefire was immediately broken. Alexei Kosygin, the chairman of the USSR Council of Ministers, cancelled an official meeting with Danish Prime Minister Anker Jørgensen to travel to Egypt where he tried to persuade Sadat to sign a peace treaty. During Kosygin's two-day long stay it is unknown if he and Sadat ever met in person.

The Israeli military then continued their drive to encircle the Egyptian army. The encirclement was completed on 24 October, three days after the ceasefire was broken. This development prompted superpower tension, but a second ceasefire was imposed cooperatively on 25 October to end the war. At the conclusion of hostilities, Israeli forces were 40 kilometres (25 mi) from Damascus and 101 kilometres (63 mi) from Cairo.

=== Peace with Israel ===
External audio
- National Press Club Luncheon Speakers Anwar Sadat, 6 February 1978, National Press Club. Speech begins at 7:31

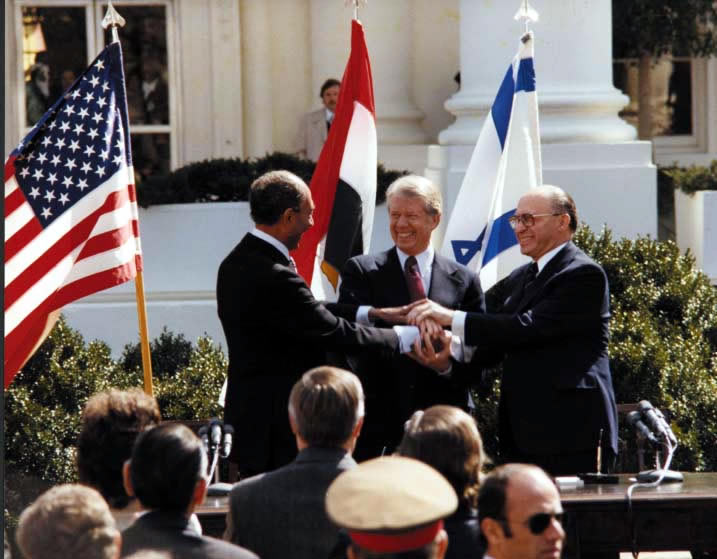
President Jimmy Carter shaking hands with Sadat and Israeli prime minister Menachem Begin at the signing of the Egyptian–Israeli Peace Treaty on the grounds of the White House, 1979

The initial Egyptian and Syrian victories in the war restored popular morale throughout Egypt and the Arab World and, for many years after, Sadat was known as the "Hero of the Crossing". Israel recognized Egypt as a formidable foe, and Egypt's renewed political significance eventually led to regaining and reopening the Suez Canal through the peace process. His new peace policy led to the conclusion of two agreements on disengagement of forces with the Israeli government. The first of these agreements was signed on 18 January 1974, and the second on 4 September 1975.

One major aspect of Sadat's peace policy was to gain some religious support for his efforts. Already during his visit to the US in October–November 1975, he invited Evangelical pastor Billy Graham for an official visit, which was held a few days after Sadat's visit. In addition to cultivating relations with Evangelical Christians in the US, he also built some cooperation with the Vatican. On 8 April 1976, he visited the Vatican for the first time, and got a message of support from Pope Paul VI regarding achieving peace with Israel, to include a just solution to the Palestinian issue. Sadat, on his part, extended to the Pope a public invitation to visit Cairo.

Sadat also used the media to promote his purposes. In an interview he gave to the Lebanese magazine Al Hawadeth in early February 1976, he claimed he had secret commitment from the US government to put pressure on the Israeli government for a major withdrawal in Sinai and the Golan Heights. This statement caused some concern to the Israeli government, but Secretary of State Henry Kissinger denied such a promise was ever made.

Law 43 of 1974 or Infitah, was Anwar Sadat's policy of "opening the door" to foreign private investment within Egypt, in the years after ending the war with Israel. Infitah was accompanied by a break with longtime ally and aid-giver the USSR—which was replaced by the United States. The policy ended the domination of Egypt's economy by the public sector and encouraged both domestic and foreign investment in the private sector. Millions of previously poor Egyptians who had joined the middle class under the Nasser regime through education and jobs for the government or parastatals, were left stuck in an "increasingly marginalized, stagnant and low-paying public sector," under Infitah.

In January 1977, a series of 'Bread Riots' protested Sadat's economic liberalization and specifically a government decree lifting price controls on basic necessities like bread. The riots lasted for two days and included hundreds of thousands in Cairo. 120 buses and hundreds of buildings were destroyed in Cairo alone. The riots ended with the deployment of the army and the re-institution of the subsidies/price controls. During this time, Sadat was also taking a new approach towards improving relations with the West.

The United States and the Soviet Union agreed on 1 October 1977, on principles to govern a Geneva conference on the Middle East. Syria continued to resist such a conference. Not wanting either Syria or the Soviet Union to influence the peace process, Sadat decided to take more progressive stance towards building a comprehensive peace agreement with Israel.

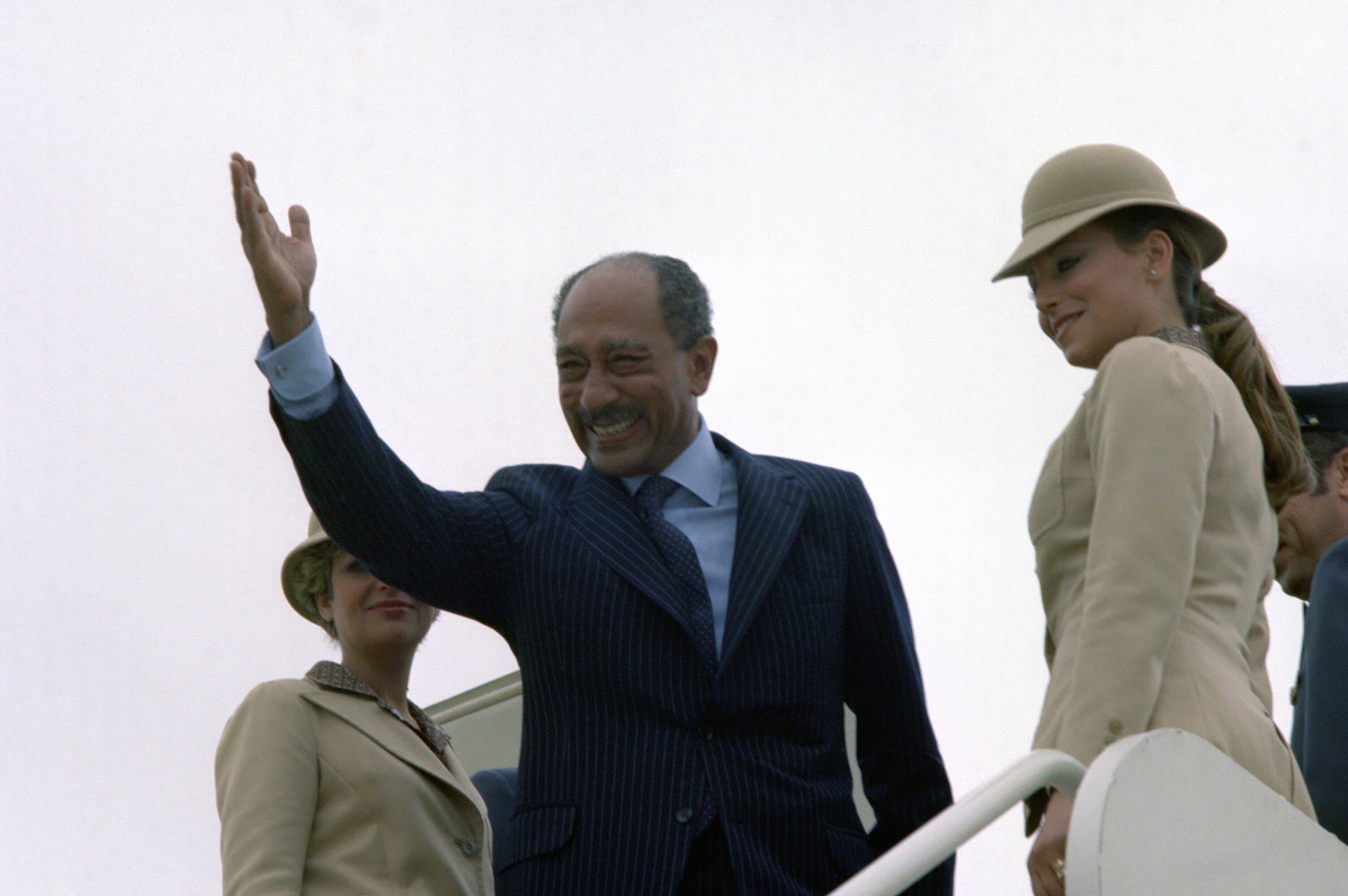
Sadat in 1978

The 1977 visit by Anwar Sadat to Jerusalem was the first time an Arab leader officially visited Israeli-controlled territory. Sadat met with Israeli prime minister Menachem Begin, and spoke before the Knesset in Jerusalem about his views on how to achieve a comprehensive peace to the Arab–Israeli conflict, which included the full implementation of UN Resolutions 242 and 338.

The peace treaty was finally signed by Anwar Sadat and Israeli prime minister Menachem Begin in Washington, D.C., United States, on 26 March 1979, following the Camp David Accords, a series of meetings between Egypt and Israel facilitated by US president Jimmy Carter. Both Sadat and Begin were awarded the Nobel Peace Prize for creating the treaty. In his acceptance speech, Sadat referred to the long-awaited peace desired by both Arabs and Israelis.

The main features of the agreement were the mutual recognition of each country by the other, the cessation of the state of war that had existed since the 1948 Arab–Israeli War, and the complete withdrawal by Israel of its armed forces and civilians from the rest of the Sinai Peninsula, which Israel had captured during the 1967 Six-Day War.

The agreement also provided for the free passage of Israeli ships through the Suez Canal and recognition of the Strait of Tiran and the Gulf of Aqaba as international waterways. The agreement notably made Egypt the first Arab country to officially recognize Israel. The peace agreement between Egypt and Israel has remained in effect since the treaty was signed.

The treaty was extremely unpopular in most of the Arab World and the wider Muslim World. His predecessor Nasser had made Egypt an icon of Arab nationalism, an ideology that appeared to be sidelined by an Egyptian orientation following the 1973 war (see National identity of Egyptians). The neighboring Arab countries believed that in signing the accords, Sadat had put Egypt's interests ahead of Arab unity, betraying Nasser's pan-Arabism, and destroyed the vision of a united "Arab front" for the support of the Palestinians against the "Zionist Entity". However, Sadat decided early on that peace was the solution. Sadat's shift towards a strategic relationship with the US was also seen as a betrayal by many Arabs. In the United States his peace moves gained him popularity among some Evangelical circles. He was awarded the Prince of Peace Award by Pat Robertson.

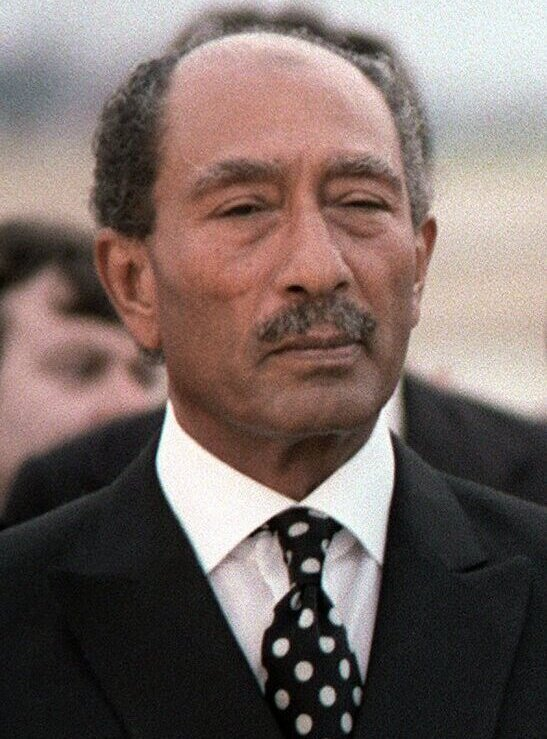
Sadat in 1980

In 1979, the Arab League suspended Egypt in the wake of the Egyptian–Israel peace agreement, and the League moved its headquarters from Cairo to Tunis. Arab League member states believed in the elimination of the "Zionist Entity" and Israel at that time. It was not until 1989 that the League re-admitted Egypt as a member, and returned its headquarters to Cairo. As part of the peace deal, Israel withdrew from the Sinai Peninsula in phases, completing its withdrawal from the entire territory except the town of Taba by 25 April 1982 (withdrawal from which did not occur until 1989). The improved relations Egypt gained with the West through the Camp David Accords soon gave the country resilient economic growth. By 1980, however, Egypt's strained relations with the Arab World would result in a period of rapid inflation.

=== Relationship with Mohammad Reza Shah Pahlavi of Iran ===
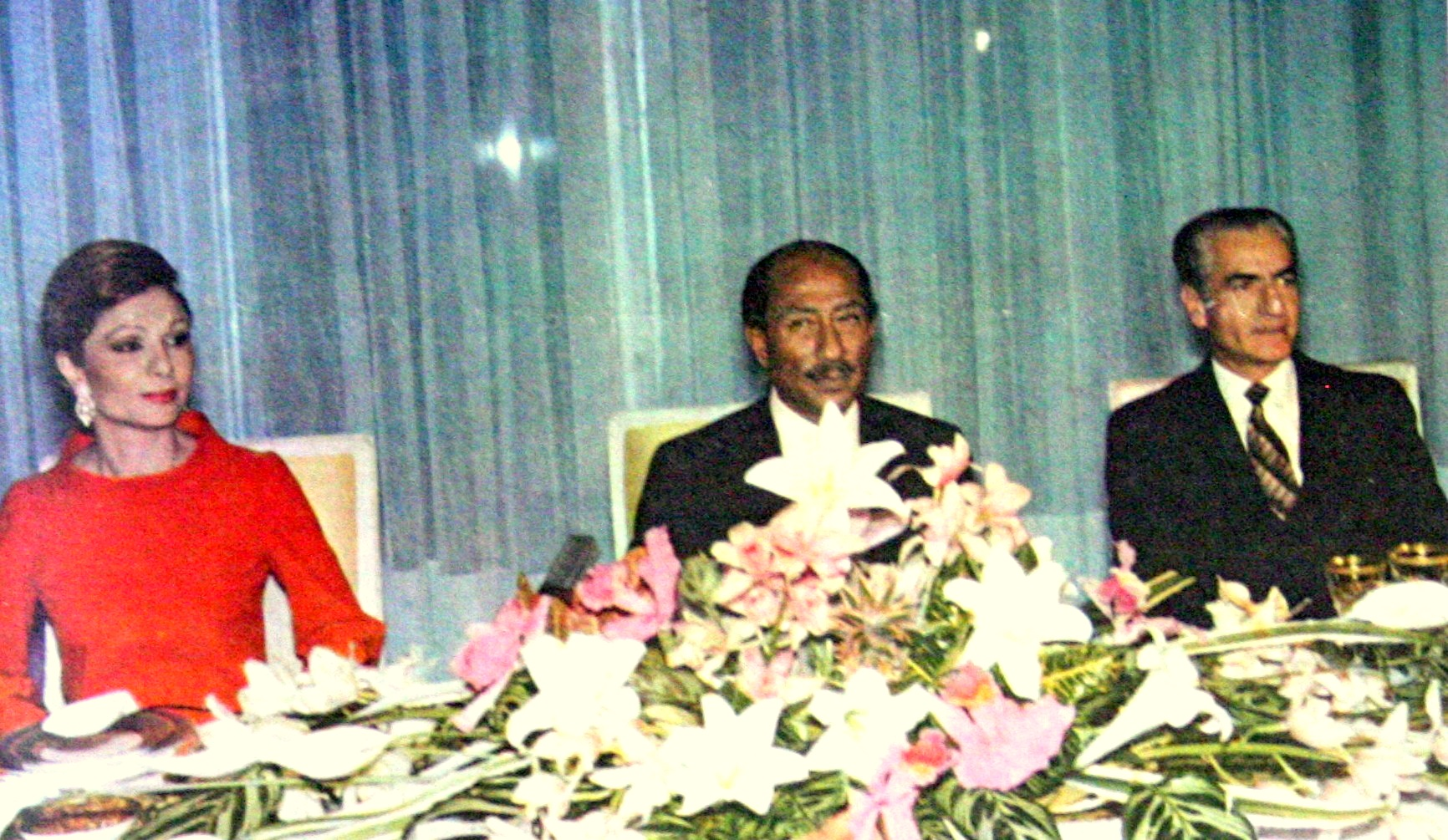
Queen Farah Diba, President Anwar Sadat and Shah Mohammad Reza Pahlavi in Tehran in 1975

The relationship between Iran and Egypt had fallen into open hostility during Gamal Abdel Nasser's presidency. Following his death in 1970, President Sadat turned this around quickly into an open and close friendship.

In 1971, Sadat addressed the Iranian parliament in Tehran in fluent Persian, describing the 2,500-year-old historic connection between the two lands.

Overnight, the Egyptian and Iranian governments were turned from bitter enemies into fast friends. The relationship between Cairo and Tehran became so friendly that the Shah of Iran, Mohammad Reza Pahlavi, called Sadat his "dear brother".

After the 1973 war with Israel, Iran assumed a leading role in cleaning up and reactivating the blocked Suez Canal with heavy investment. The country also facilitated the withdrawal of Israel from the occupied Sinai Peninsula by promising to substitute the loss of the oil to the Israelis with free Iranian oil if they withdrew from the Egyptian oil wells in western Sinai.

All these added more to the personal friendship between Sadat and the Shah of Iran. (The Shah's first wife was Princess Fawzia of Egypt. She was the eldest daughter of Sultan Fuad I of Egypt and Sudan (later King Fuad I) and his second wife Nazli Sabri.)

After his overthrow, the deposed Shah spent the last months of his life in exile in Egypt. When the Shah died, Sadat ordered that he be given a state funeral and be interred at the Al-Rifa'i Mosque in Cairo, the resting place of Egyptian Khedive Isma'il Pasha, his mother Khushyar Hanim, and numerous other members of the royal family of Egypt and Sudan.

== Assassination ==
The last months of Sadat's presidency were marked by internal uprising. Sadat dismissed allegations that the rioting was incited by domestic issues, believing that the Soviet Union was recruiting its regional allies in Libya and Syria to incite an uprising that would eventually force him out of power. Following a failed military coup in June 1981, Sadat ordered a major crackdown that resulted in the arrest of numerous opposition figures. Although Sadat still maintained high levels of popularity in Egypt, it has been said that he was assassinated "at the peak" of his unpopularity.

Earlier in his presidency, Islamists had benefited from the 'rectification revolution' and the release from prison of activists jailed under Nasser. But Sadat's Sinai treaty with Israel enraged Islamists, particularly the radical Egyptian Islamic Jihad. According to interviews and information gathered by journalist Lawrence Wright, the group was recruiting military officers and accumulating weapons, waiting for the right moment to launch "a complete overthrow of the existing order" in Egypt. Chief strategist of El-Jihad was Abbud al-Zumar, a colonel in the military intelligence whose "plan was to kill the main leaders of the country, capture the headquarters of the army and State Security, the telephone exchange building, and of course the radio and television building, where news of the Islamic revolution would then be broadcast, unleashing – he expected – a popular uprising against secular authority all over the country".

In February 1981, Egyptian authorities were alerted to El-Jihad's plan by the arrest of an operative carrying crucial information. In September, Sadat ordered a highly unpopular roundup of more than 1,500 people, including many Jihad members, but also the Coptic Pope and other Coptic clergy, intellectuals and activists of all ideological stripes. All non-government press was banned as well. The roundup missed a Jihad cell in the military led by Lieutenant Khalid Al-Islambuli, who would succeed in assassinating Anwar Sadat that October. The assassination plot altogether was led by Muhammad Abd al-Salam Faraj, an Egyptian Islamic Jihad member who was a civilian engineer.

According to Tala'at Qasim, ex-head of the Gama'a Islamiyya interviewed in Middle East Report, it was not Islamic Jihad but his organization, known in English as the "Islamic Group", that organized the assassination and recruited the assassin (Al-Islambuli). Members of the Group's 'Majlis el-Shura' ('Consultative Council') – headed by the famed 'blind shaykh' – were arrested two weeks before the killing, but they did not disclose the existing plans and Al-Islambuli succeeded in assassinating Sadat.

On 6 October 1981, Sadat was assassinated during the annual victory parade held in Cairo to celebrate Egypt's crossing of the Suez Canal. Al-Islambuli emptied his assault rifle into Sadat's body while in the front of the grandstand, mortally wounding the President. In addition to Sadat, eleven others were killed, including the Cuban ambassador, an Omani general, a Coptic Orthodox bishop and Samir Helmy, the head of Egypt's Central Auditing Agency (CAA). Twenty-eight were wounded, including Vice President Hosni Mubarak, Irish Defence Minister James Tully, and four US military liaison officers.

The assassination squad was led by Lieutenant Al-Islambuli after a fatwā approving the assassination had been obtained from Omar Abdel-Rahman. Al-Salam Faraj and four defendants who directly attacked Sadat, including Al-Islambuli, were found guilty, sentenced to death, and executed on April 15, 1982. Sadat's two military assailants, al-Islambuli and Sergeant Hussein Abbas Mohammed, were executed by a firing squad, while the three civilian perpetrators, al-Salam Faraj, engineer and former army officer Abdel-Salam Abdel Aal and engineer Atta Tayel Hemida Raheel, were hanged. By April 1982, 19 people would be tried for Sadat's assassination, with 17 being jailed and two being acquitted.

== Aftermath ==
Sadat was succeeded by his vice president Hosni Mubarak, whose hand was injured during the attack. Sadat's funeral was attended by a record number of dignitaries from around the world, including a rare simultaneous attendance by three former US presidents: Gerald Ford, Jimmy Carter and Richard Nixon. Sudan's President Gaafar Nimeiry was the only Arab head of state to attend the funeral. Only 3 of 24 states in the Arab League – Oman, Somalia and Sudan – sent representatives at all. Israel's prime minister, Menachem Begin, considered Sadat a personal friend and insisted on attending the funeral, walking throughout the funeral procession so as not to desecrate the Sabbath. Sadat was buried in the unknown soldier memorial in Cairo, across the street from the stand where he was assassinated.

Over three hundred Islamic radicals were indicted in the trial of assassin Khalid Al-Islambuli, including future al-Qaeda leader Ayman al-Zawahiri, Omar Abdel-Rahman, and Abd al-Hamid Kishk. The trial was covered by the international press and Zawahiri's knowledge of English made him the de facto spokesman for the defendants. Zawahiri was released from prison in 1984. Abboud al-Zomor and Tareq al-Zomor, two Islamic Jihad leaders imprisoned in connection with the assassination, were released on 11 March 2011.

Despite these facts, the nephew of the late president, Talaat Sadat, claimed that the assassination was an international conspiracy. On 31 October 2006, he was sentenced to a year in prison for defaming Egypt's armed forces, less than a month after he gave the interview accusing Egyptian generals of masterminding his uncle's assassination. In an interview with a Saudi television channel, he also claimed both the United States and Israel were involved noting that no one from the special personal protection group of Sadat fired a single shot during the killing, and not one of them has been put on trial.

== Media portrayals of Anwar Sadat ==
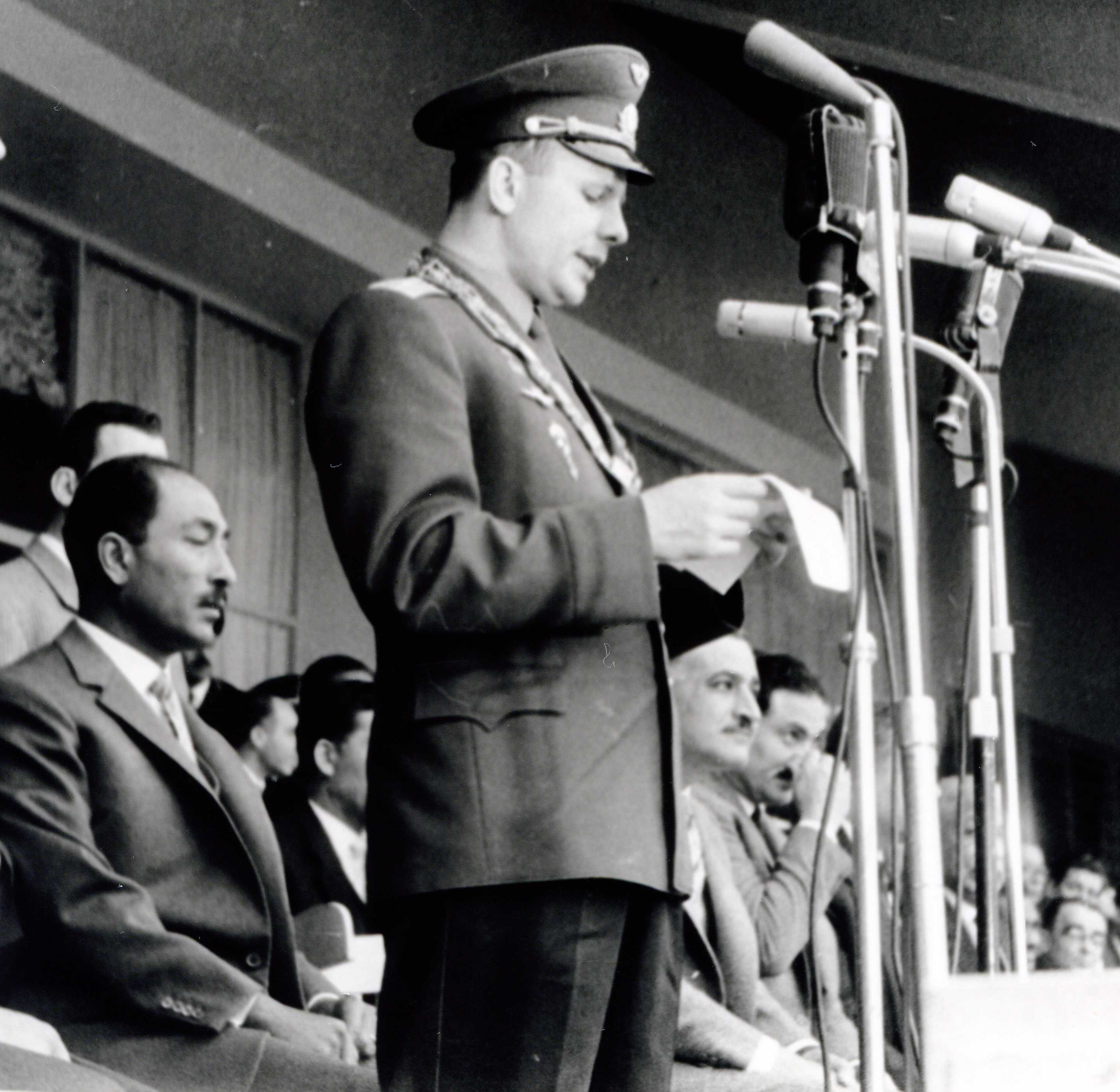
Yuri Gagarin with Sadat and Gamal Abdel Nasser in Cairo, 1962

In 1983, Sadat, a miniseries based on the life of Anwar Sadat, aired on US television with Oscar-winning actor Louis Gossett Jr. in the title role. The film was promptly banned by the Egyptian government, as were all other movies produced and distributed by Columbia Pictures, over allegations of historical inaccuracies. A civil lawsuit was brought by Egypt's artists' and film unions against Columbia Pictures and the film's directors, producers and scriptwriters before a court in Cairo, but was dismissed, since the alleged slanders, having taken place outside the country, fell outside the Egyptian courts' jurisdiction.

The film was critically acclaimed in North America, but was unpopular among Egyptians and in the Egyptian press. Western authors attributed the film's poor reception in Egypt to racism – Gossett being African-American – in the Egyptian government or Egypt in general. Either way, one Western source wrote that Sadat's portrayal by Gossett "bothered race-conscious Egyptians and wouldn't have pleased [the deceased] Sadat," who identified as Egyptian and Northeast African, not black. The two-part series earned Gossett an Emmy nomination in the United States.

He was portrayed by Robert Loggia in the 1982 television movie A Woman Called Golda, opposite Ingrid Bergman as Golda Meir.

The first Egyptian depiction of Sadat's life came in 2001, when Ayyam El Sadat (English: The Days of Sadat) was released in Egyptian cinemas. The movie was a major success in Egypt, and was hailed as Ahmed Zaki's greatest performance to date.

== Honours awarded ==
=== National ===
- Collar of the Order of the Republic
- Grand Cordon of the Order of the Nile
- Grand Cross of the Order of Merit
- Supreme Class of the Order of the Virtues

=== Foreign ===
- Austria: Grand Star of the Decoration of Honour for Services to the Republic of Austria
- Italy: Knight Grand Cross of the Order of Merit of the Italian Republic
- Kuwait: Collar of the Order of Mubarak the Great
- Malaysia: Honorary Grand Commander of the Order of the Defender of the Realm (SMN (K)) with title Tun (1965)
- Nepal:
  - Member First Class of the Order of the Star of Nepal
  - Member of the Order of the Benevolent Ruler
- Saudi Arabia: First Class of the Order of King Abdulaziz
- Syria: Member First Class of the Order of the Umayyads
- Tunisia: Grand Cross of the Order of the Republic
- United States:
  - Recipient of the Presidential Medal of Freedom (1984)
  - Recipient of the Congressional Gold Medal (2018, posthumous)
- Yugoslavia
  - Order of the Yugoslav Great Star (1977)

=== Non-state awards ===
- House of Zogu (1946): Grand Cross of the Order of Fidelity

== Bibliography ==
- Sadat, Anwar (1954). قصة الثورة كاملة [The Full Story of the Revolution] (in Arabic). Cairo: Dar el-Hilal. OCLC 23485697.
- Sadat, Anwar (1955). صفحات مجهولة [Unknown Pages of the Revolution] (in Arabic). Cairo: Dār al-Taḥrīr lil-Ṭabʻ wa-al-Nashr. OCLC 10739895.
- Sadat, Anwar (1957). Revolt on the Nile. New York: J. Day Co. OCLC 1226176.
- Sadat, Anwar (1958). Son, This Is Your Uncle Gamal – Memoirs of Anwar el-Sadat. Beirut: Maktabat al-ʻIrfān. OCLC 27919901.
- Sadat, Anwar (1978). In Search of Identity: An Autobiography. New York: Harper & Row. ISBN 978-0-06-013742-7.

== See also ==
- History of Egypt under Anwar Sadat

== Sources ==
- Tripp, Charles (1993). "Ali Mahir and the Politics of the Egyptian Army, 1936–1942". Contemporary Egypt: Through Egyptian eyes. Routledge. pp. 45–71. ISBN 9780203413166.

Political offices
Preceded by Abdul Latif El-Bughadi	President of the National Assembly of Egypt; 1960–1968	Succeeded by Dr. Mohamed Labib Skokeir
Preceded by Gamal Abdel Nasser	President of Egypt; 1970–1981	Succeeded by Sufi Abu Taleb acting
Preceded by Aziz Sedki	Prime Minister of Egypt; 1973–1974	Succeeded by Abdelaziz Muhammad Hejazi
Preceded by Mustafa Khalil	Prime Minister of Egypt; 1980–1981	Succeeded by Hosni Mubarak
Party political offices
Preceded by None	Chairman of the National Democratic Party; 1978–1981	Succeeded by Hosni Mubarak
