= Declaration of the Republic =

Egypt's transition to a republic

The Declaration of the Republic was a constitutional declaration issued by the Revolutionary Command Council of Egypt on June 18, 1953. The Declaration dethroned King Fuad II and transitioned the Kingdom of Egypt to the Republic of Egypt.

== Timeline ==
- The Egyptian Revolution of 1952 demanded that King Farouk abdicate to his son and heir apparent, Prince Ahmed Fuad, and leave the country before 18:30 on July 26, 1952.
- On December 10, 1952, the dissolution of the Constitution of 1923 was announced by the Revolutionary Command Council.
- On January 15, 1953, the Revolutionary Command Council abolished political parties and specified a transitional period of three years.
- On February 10, 1953, the Council issued a constitutional declaration publicizing the provisions for an interim constitution.
- On June 18, 1953, the Republic was declared which abolished the monarchy and ended the 148 year rule of the Muhammad Ali Dynasty with Muhammad Naguib becoming the first President of Egypt.

== Contents ==
The document claims that the opulent lifestyle of the Muhammad Ali family, specifically Ismai'il Pasha, drove Egypt into debt, which gave foreign militaries a plea to occupy the country.

The document includes three demands:

- The abolition of the Muhammad Ali monarchy
- The declaration of a republic led by Mohamed Naguib
- The persistence of the Command Council throughout the 'transitional period'

The document ends with a religious note: "We have to trust God and ourselves, and to feel the pride that God has endowed to his faithful worshippers."

== Signatories ==
- Major General Staff Muhammad Naguib, Leader of the Army Revolution
- Binbashi Staff Gamal Abdul Nasser Hussein
- Wing Commander Gamal Salem
- Wing Commander Abdel Latif Mahmoud Boghdadi
- Binbashi Staff Zakaria Mohieddin
- Binbashi Anwar El-Sadat
- Binbashi Hussein El-Shafei
- Sagh Staff Abdel Hakim Amer
- Sagh Staff Salah el-Din Mustafa Salem
- Sagh Staff Kamal El-Din Hussein
- Squadrons Leader Hassan Ibrahim
- Sagh Khaled Mohieddin
