= Project FF =

CIA plan for regime change in Egypt in 1952

Project FF or Fat Fucker was a Central Intelligence Agency (CIA) project in the 1950s aimed at pressuring King Farouk of Egypt to make political reforms that would lessen the likelihood of political change in the country contrary to American interests. The government of the United States was concerned that the ever-increasing political instability in Egypt, much of it linked to the perceived corruption and incompetence of both the royal court and the traditional political establishment, would inevitably result in the toppling of the Egyptian government if not remedied. In particular, they feared the prospect of a partial or full communist takeover. The project was masterminded by CIA Director Allen Dulles, Secretary of State Dean Acheson, CIA operative Kermit "Kim" Roosevelt Jr., and CIA Station Chief in Cairo Miles Copeland, Jr.

The historian Matthew F. Holland wrote, "Kim's idea was to orchestrate 'peaceful revolution' in Egypt to replace the corrupt political system in Egypt with a progressive dictatorship under the king that would be more amenable to American control. Copeland had unofficially named the operation 'Project FF', the 'FF' unflatteringly standing for 'Fat Fucker'."

However, the unwillingness of Farouk to change eventually caused the project to move to support his overthrow. Roosevelt secretly met with the Free Officers Movement, a group of nationalist revolutionaries in the army of Egypt and Sudan that was opposed to the monarchy and to the United Kingdom's continuing military presence in the country. The Free Officers, led by Mohamed Naguib and Gamal Abdel Nasser, had already been planning to overthrow Farouk, and launched their revolution with a coup d'etat against the King on 23 July 1952. Miles Copeland stated that the US provided support for the revolutionary government to be "coup proof" and helped in establishing the new General Intelligence Agency (Al-Mukhabarat el Aam), modelled after the American Central Intelligence Agency, as well as German advisors who had served in Nazi Germany military intelligence, including the Abwehr, to help with the rebuilding of security apparatus.

Project FF was used as a blueprint for the following year's Operation Ajax, the CIA role in the coup backed by the Americans and the British in Iran against the democratically-elected Prime Minister Mohammad Mosaddegh.

== See also ==
- 1949 Syrian coup d'état
- 1953 Iranian coup d'état
- United States involvement in regime change
