= Land reform in Egypt =

The post-revolution Egyptian land reform was an effort to change land ownership practices in Egypt following the 1952 Revolution launched by Gamal Abdel Nasser and the Free Officers Movement.

== Problems prior to 1952 ==
Prior to the 1952 coup that installed Muhammad Naguib as president, less than six percent of Egypt's population owned more than 65% of the land in the country, and less than 0.5% of Egyptians owned more than one-third of all fertile land. These major owners had almost autocratic control over the land they owned and charged high rents which averaged 75% of the income generated by the rented land. These high rents coupled with the high interest rates charged by banks plunged many small farmers and peasants into debt. Peasants who worked as laborers on farms also suffered, receiving average wages of only eight to fifteen piastres a day. The combination of these circumstances led historian Anouar Abdel Malek to call the pre-reform Egyptian peasantry "an exploited mass surrounded by hunger, disease and death". Another historian, Robert Stephens, has compared the state of Egyptian peasants before land reform to that of French peasants before the French Revolution.

== Law Number 178 ==
On September 11, 1952, Law Number 178 began the process of land reform in Egypt. The law had numerous provisions that attempted to remedy the Egyptian land problems:

- Land owners were prohibited to possess more than 200 feddans of land. However, fathers with more than 2 children were allowed to own 300 feddans.
- A limit on the rental rate for land was set at seven times the land tax value of the plot of land.
- All land leases were given a minimum duration of three years.
- The government established cooperatives for farmers holding less than five feddans. The members of these cooperatives worked together to obtain supplies such as fertilizers, pesticides, and seeds as well as cooperating to transport their products to market.
- A minimum wage for agricultural workers was set at 18 piastres per day.

Additionally, the law provided for the redistribution of any land that owners held over the limits it established:

- Each affected owner would receive compensation for his excess land in government bonds worth a total of ten times the rental value of the land. These bonds would pay 3% interest and mature in thirty years.
- All land bought by the government would be sold to peasants though no person could obtain more than five feddans from the government. Peasants who bought land would pay the government the cost of the land and a 15% surcharge over a period of thirty years.

Law 178 initially met opposition from Prime Minister Ali Maher Pasha who supported a limit of 500 feddans for land ownership. However, the Revolutionary Command Council demonstrated its power by forcing him to resign, replacing him with Muhammad Naguib and passing the law.

== Modifications to land reform ==
In 1958, three provisions of the land reform law were revised:

- The interest on the bonds the government used to repay owners of seized land was lowered to 1.5%.
- People who purchased land from the government were given forty years (in place of thirty) to complete repayment.
- The government surcharge to be paid by purchasers was lowered to 10%.

In 1961, the government again revised the land reform program by lowering the land ownership maximum to one hundred feddans.

== Results ==
Initially, land reform essentially abolished the political influence of major land owners. However, it only resulted in the redistribution of about 15% of Egypt's land under cultivation, and by the early 1980s, the effects of land reform in Egypt drew to a halt as the population of Egypt moved away from agriculture. The Egyptian land reform laws were greatly curtailed under Anwar Sadat and eventually abolished.

== See also ==
- Land reform
- Arab Socialism
- Agrarian Reform
