= Youssef Seddik (officer) =

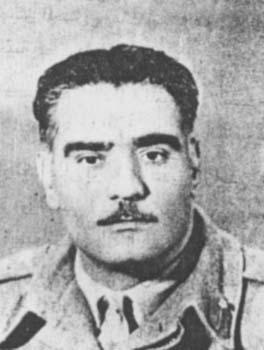
Youssef Seddik

Youssef Seddik (Arabic: يوسف صديق, often spelt Yusuf Sedik or Yusef el-Sediq) (January 3, 1910 – March 31, 1975) was an Egyptian military figure and politician. He is noted for his role in launching the first military procedures in the Egyptian Revolution of 1952.

== Military career ==
Seddik graduated from Military Academy in 1933. He was active in the 1948 Palestine War. He joined the ranks of the underground Free Officers Movement in 1951, becoming its most senior member after Muhammad Naguib, and was a lieutenant-colonel of the infantry by 1952. Seddik had been a member of a Communist organisation, the Democratic Movement for National Liberation (DMNL), when the Free Officers requested his membership.

On July 23, 1952 was the first to take army action at the beginning of the coup which removed King Farouk and the monarchy from power. He had swiftly moved his forces to occupy the Egyptian Army Headquarters at Kobri al-Qubba an hour before the appointed time. Some attribute this to a glitch in communication. The Minister of War at the time, Haydar Pasha, knew of the Free Officers' plans and had Seddik not set out with his motorized columns from the Hikestep Army Camp prior to the scheduled time of the coup, the minister would have been able thwart their actions.

== Conflict with the Revolutionary Command Council ==
The leaders of the Free Officers decided to make him a member of the Egyptian Revolutionary Command Council (RCC)—the ruling body that ruled Egypt in the aftermath of the coup—in recognition of his role in the revolution's success. However, Seddik quickly began expressing opposition to many of the RCC's decisions, especially the execution of two Communist workers who incited strikes in factories in Kafr el-Dawwar in August 1952. According to Ahmad Hamrous, a Free Officer himself, Seddik said, "any chance I ever had of cooperating with them became impossible. I could not possibly allow myself to go down in history as someone who had remained a member of a Council that abolished civil liberties, sentenced workers to death and placed patriots in jail."

He resigned from the Revolution Command Council in February 1953 and exiled in Switzerland, disappearing from public life. Seddik was arrested in August 1953 when he secretly returned to Egypt. He was placed under house arrest for a few months, and when he was freed he attempted to make an alliance with President Mohamed Naguib which was not materialized. Following the removal of Naguib, Seddik was arrested and detained in a military prison for one year. Next he and his wife were put under house arrest for two years.

In a 1962 speech, Nasser acknowledged the Free Officers' debt to Seddik, saying that without his action "all our efforts would have come to nothing."

== Death ==
Egyptian President Anwar Sadat gave Seddik a state pension when he came to power in 1970 and also sent him for medical treatment in Moscow. When Seddik died in 1975, he was given a full military funeral.
