= Agrarian Reform Law =

Agrarian Reform Law may refer to:

- Agrarian Reform Law (Albania), of 1945
- Agrarian Reform Law (Bolivia), decreed in August 1953
- Agrarian Reform Law (Cuba), of 1959
- Agrarian Reform Law (Nicaragua), of 1979
- Agrarian Reform Law (Syria), decreed in 1958, 1962, 1963 and in 1967
- Agrarian reform of 1952
- Latvian Land Reform of 1920
- Roman Agrarian law
