= Egyptian revolution of 1952 =

Military overthrow of King Farouk

Egyptian coup of 1952
- Part of the decolonisation of Africa and Asia, the Cold War
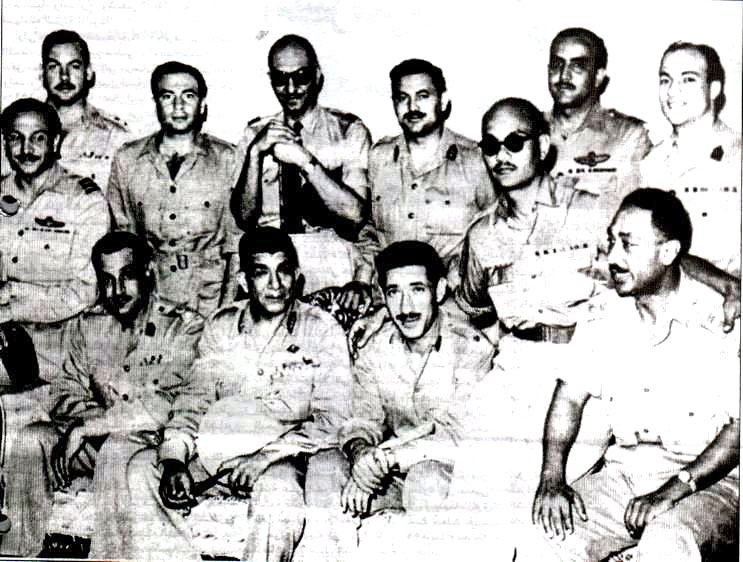
- Members of the Free Officers Movement of Egypt
Date	23 July 1952
Location	Kingdom of Egypt
Result	Free Officers movement victory: Coup successfully orchestrated; End of rule of the Muhammad Ali dynasty; The Kingdom of Egypt becomes the Republic of Egypt; End of British influence in Egypt; Dictatorship imposed until the 2011 revolution; Independence of Sudan in 1956; Beginning of the Nasser era; Revolutionary wave across the Arab world

Belligerents
Kingdom of Egypt; Supported by: United Kingdom	(Egypt) Free Officers movement Supported by: United States

Commanders and leaders
(Egypt) Farouk; (Egypt) Ahmed Naguib el-Hilaly	Mohamed Naguib; Gamal Abdel Nasser; Anwar Sadat; Khaled Mohieddin; Abdel Latif Boghdadi; Abdel Hakim Amer; Gamal Salem; Salah Salem; Zakaria Mohieddin; Hussein el-Shafei; Hassan Ibrahim; Kamal el-Din Hussein; Abdel Moneim Amin

On 23 July 1952, a coup began in Egypt with the toppling of King Farouk in a coup d'état by the Free Officers Movement, a group of army officers led by Mohamed Naguib and Gamal Abdel Nasser. It ushered in a wave of revolutionary politics in the Arab world, contributing to the escalation of decolonization and the development of Third World solidarity during the Cold War.

Though initially focused on grievances against King Farouk, the movement had more wide-ranging political ambitions. In the first three years of the Revolution, the Free Officers moved to abolish the constitutional monarchy and aristocracy of Egypt and Sudan, establish a republic, end the British occupation of the country, and secure the independence of Sudan (previously governed as a condominium of Egypt and the United Kingdom). The revolutionary government adopted a staunchly nationalist, anti-imperialist agenda, which came to be expressed chiefly through Arab nationalism, and the international non-alignment.

The coup was faced with immediate threats from Western imperial powers, particularly the United Kingdom, which had occupied Egypt since 1882, and France, both of whom were wary of rising nationalist sentiment in territories under their control throughout Africa and the Arab world. The ongoing state of war with Israel also posed a serious challenge, as the Free Officers increased Egypt's already strong support of the Palestinians. These two issues converged in the fourth year of the coup when Egypt was invaded by the United Kingdom, France, and Israel in the Suez Crisis of 1956 (known in Egypt as the Tripartite Aggression). Despite enormous military losses, the war was seen as a political victory for Egypt, especially as it left the Suez Canal in uncontested Egyptian control for the first time since 1875, erasing what was seen as a mark of national humiliation. This strengthened the appeal of the coup in other Arab countries.

Wholesale agrarian reform, and large-scale industrialization programs were initiated in the first decade and half of the revolution, leading to an unprecedented period of infrastructure building, and urbanization. By the 1960s, Arab socialism had become a dominant theme, transforming Egypt into a centrally planned economy. Official fear of a Western-sponsored counter-revolution, domestic religious extremism, potential communist infiltration, and the conflict with the State of Israel were all cited as reasons compelling severe and longstanding restrictions on political opposition, and the prohibition of a multi-party system. These restrictions on political activity would remain in place until the presidency of Anwar Sadat from 1970 onwards, during which many of the policies of the coup were scaled back or reversed.

The early successes of the coup encouraged numerous other nationalist movements in other countries, such as Algeria, where there were anti-imperialist and anti-colonial rebellions against European empires. It also inspired the toppling of existing pro-Western monarchies and governments in the Middle East and North Africa. The coup is commemorated each year on 23 July.

== Background and causes ==
=== Muhammad Ali dynasty ===
The history of Egypt during the 19th and early 20th centuries was defined by the vastly different reigns of successive members of the Muhammad Ali dynasty and the gradually increasing intrusion into Egyptian affairs of the great powers, particularly the United Kingdom and France. From 1805, Egypt underwent a period of rapid modernisation under Muhammad Ali Pasha, who declared himself Khedive in defiance of his nominal suzerain, the Ottoman Sultan. Within a matter of decades, Muhammad Ali transformed Egypt from a neglected Ottoman province to a virtually independent state that temporarily rivalled the Ottoman Empire for dominance in the Eastern Mediterranean and the Mashriq. Muhammad Ali conquered the Sudan, invaded East Africa, and led Egypt during both the First Egyptian–Ottoman War and the Second Egyptian–Ottoman War, triggering the Oriental Crisis. As a result of these wars, Egypt was expelled from the Levant, but allowed to keep its Sudanese territory. After Muhammad Ali's death, his successors Abbas I and Sa'id attempted to modernize Egypt, starting construction of the Suez Canal. Due to conscription, taxes were raised on nobles in exchange for more land and peasants (fellahin in Arabic). Peasants continued to lose access to their land as cotton became a major cash crop in Egypt.

Under Isma'il the Magnificent, Egypt went through massive modernization programmes and campaigns of military expansion in Sudan and East Africa. Isma'il greatly accelerated the enfranchisement of the Egyptian peasantry and middle class, who had been politically and economically marginalized by the wealthy elites of Egyptian society. It was during this time that an Egyptian intelligentsia was formed, a social class of educated Egyptians well-read in politics and culture known as the Effendi. Under the education minister Ali Pasha Mubarak, the public education system in Egypt grew the field of educated nationalist effendiyya. It was during this time that Italians, Greeks, French, Armenians, Jews, and other groups immigrated to Egypt, establishing a small but wealthy and politically powerful cosmopolitan community. Foreigners were not subject to Egyptian laws, but went through a separate court system known as the Mixed Courts. Isma'il also established Egypt's first parliament. This period of intellectualism in Egypt, and the Arab world as a whole, later became known as the Nahda. Coupled with Isma'il's powerful espousal of Egyptian statehood, this contributed to the growth of Egyptian nationalism, particularly within the army. However, the war with Ethiopia ended in disaster, further exasperating the Egyptian treasury. The Caisse de la Dette Publique (Public Debt Commission) was founded as a way for Egypt to pay its debts.

Isma'il's grand policies were ruinously expensive, and financial pressure eventually compelled him to sell Egypt's shares in the Universal Company of the Maritime Canal of Suez, the company that owned the 99-year lease to manage the Suez Canal. The sale of the Canal mere years after it had been constructed at the cost of some 80,000 Egyptian lives was seen as a national humiliation, particularly as it effectively granted the purchaser, the United Kingdom, a basis for interfering in Egyptian affairs. Shortly thereafter, the United Kingdom, along with the other Great Powers, deposed Isma'il in favour of his son, Tewfik Pasha.

Tewfik was seen as a puppet of the foreign powers who had deposed his father, a perception heightened by his repressive policies. Discontent with Tewfik's rule ignited the Urabi Revolt of 1881, led by nationalist soldiers under Ahmed Urabi. Urabi came from a peasant family, and his rise through the ranks of the military in spite of his humble background had been made possible by the reforms of Isma'il—reforms which he saw as being under attack by Tewfik. The prospect of revolutionary instability in Egypt, and the inferred danger to the Suez Canal, prompted the United Kingdom to intervene militarily in support of Tewfik.

=== British occupation under the 'Veiled Protectorate' ===
After the Anglo-Egyptian War, the United Kingdom was left in de facto control over the country, a state of affairs that became known as the veiled protectorate. In the years that followed, the United Kingdom would cement its political and military position in Egypt, and subsequently in Egypt's domains in Sudan, with the British high representative in Cairo exercising more power than the Khedive himself. In 1888, at the Convention of Constantinople, the United Kingdom won the right to protect the Suez Canal with military force, giving Britain a permanent base from which to dominate Egyptian politics.

In 1899, the United Kingdom forced Tewfik's successor as Khedive, the nationalist Abbas II, to transform Sudan from an integral part of Egypt into the Anglo-Egyptian Sudan, a condominium in which sovereignty would be shared between Egypt and the United Kingdom. Once established, the condominium witnessed ever-decreasing Egyptian control, and would for most of its existence be governed in practice by the United Kingdom through the Governor-General in Khartoum. For the remainder of his reign, this would be one of the flashpoints between the nationalist Khedive Abbas II and the United Kingdom, with Abbas seeking to arrest and reverse the process of increasing British control in Egypt and Sudan.

Egyptians nationalism was brewing under the harsh economic policies of the British. Nationalist activists such as Mostafa Kamil Pasha, Abdullah an-Nadeem and Yaqub Sanu fought for greater autonomy for Egypt. The phrase "Egypt for the Egyptians" was a popular rallying cry among nationalists in protest to the privileges of foreigners. It was during this time that the five major points of contentions among nationalists were crystallized:

1. The political status of Sudan – which was ruled as a de jure joint Anglo-Egyptian condominium but as a de facto British colony after the Mahdist rebellion
2. Ownership over the Suez Canal
3. The status of the Egyptian army – which was demobilized after the 1882 revolt – and the stationing of British troops in Egypt
4. The sovereignty of the Parliament of Egypt: its legal powers regarding foreigners and independence from British influence
5. The right for Egypt to establish foreign relations independent of Britain

Following the Ottoman Empire's entry in to the First World War as a member of the Central Powers in 1914, the United Kingdom deposed Abbas II in favour of his pro-British uncle, Hussein Kamel. The legal fiction of Ottoman sovereignty was terminated, and the Sultanate of Egypt, destroyed by the Ottoman Empire in 1517, was re-established with Hussein Kamel as Sultan. Despite the restoration of the nominal sultanate, British power in Egypt and Sudan was undiminished, as the United Kingdom declared Egypt to be a formal protectorate of the United Kingdom. Whilst Egypt was not annexed to the British Empire, with the British King never becoming sovereign of Egypt, Egypt's status as a protectorate precluded any actual independence for the sultanate. For all intents and purposes, the Sultanate of Egypt was as much controlled by the United Kingdom as the Khedivate of Egypt had been.

=== Kingdom of Egypt ===
After World War I, Egyptian nationalists tried to send a delegation (Arabic: Wafd) to the Paris Peace Conference to renegotiate for Egyptian independence. When Britain refused, nationalist anger at British control erupted into the Egyptian coup of 1919, prompting the United Kingdom to recognise Egyptian independence in 1922 as the Kingdom of Egypt. However, Britain still retained the rights over the Sudan, its empire in Egypt and foreigners:

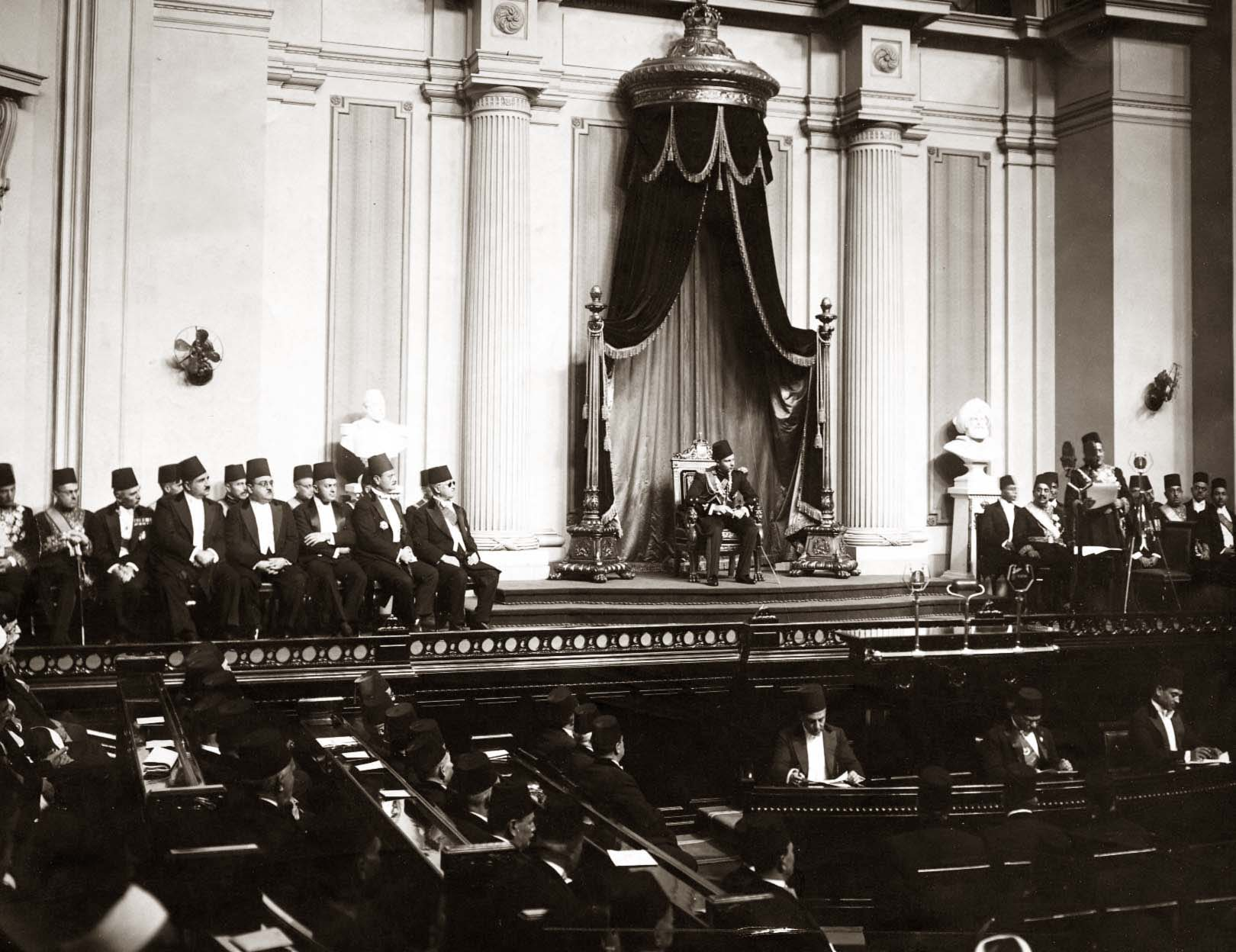
King Farouk I of Egypt in Parliament listening to Mustafa el-Nahhas Pasha's speech.

The leading party after the coup was the Wafd Party, led by Sa'ad Zaghoul and his successor Mostafa al-Nahhas. The resulting 1923 Egyptian constitution created a proper – albeit flawed – constitutional monarchy. Universal male suffrage allowed Egyptians to vote in parliamentary elections, however the king had the power to dismiss cabinets, dissolve parliament and appoint prime ministers. Politics in Egypt were divided between the liberal Wafdists versus the conservative monarchical establishment. The Wafd had little to offer outside of defending the liberal framework and negotiating for greater autonomy; Wafdist elites were still wealthy land-owning capitalists who did not offer a radical program in the traditional economic structure of peasants and landlords. While the Wafd enjoyed genuine popularity among the masses, the degrading economic conditions of Egypt beginning the 1930s combined with the failure of the 1923 regime to adequately address these issues sparked the rise of socialist and labor movements.

The Wafd believed that through gradual negotiations, it would be able to secure complete Egyptian independence. Egypt was successful in abolishing the Mixed courts in 1937, repealing the Public Debt Commission in 1940, and negotiating the 1936 Anglo-Egyptian treaty. This treaty limited the extent of British troops in Egypt (except with regards to the Suez canal and the Sudan), and the creation of a proper Egyptian military.

==== The final decade: 1942–1952 ====
During the Second World War, Egypt was a major Allied base for the North African campaign. Egypt remained officially neutral under the closing weeks of the war, however, its territory became a battlefield between the Allies and Axis Powers. In 1942, the refusal of Egypt's young King Farouk to appoint al-Nahhas prime minister led to the Abdeen Palace Incident, where the British military surrounded Farouk's palace, and ordered him at gunpoint to appoint al-Nahhas. Though nationalist army officers, including Mohamed Naguib, appealed to Farouk to resist, the deployment of British tanks and artillery outside the Royal palace forced the King to concede. This incident permanently damaged the prestige of both King Farouk's conservative clique and al-Nahhas' Wafd. The surrender to British convinced many Egyptian nationalists that only the removal of the entire 1923 system could bring an end to the United Kingdom's occupation of Egypt.

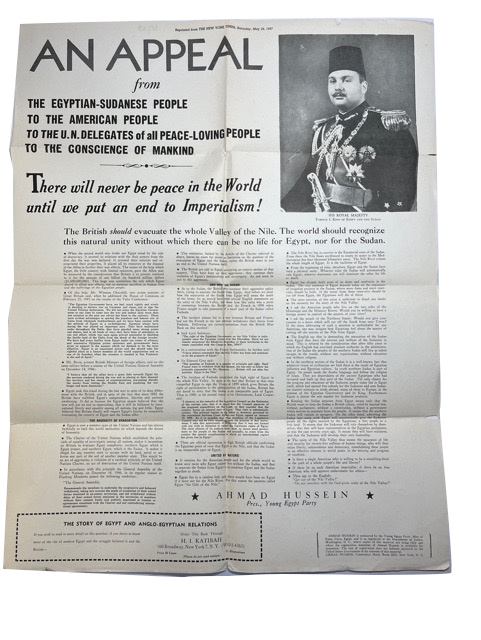
Poster from the Egyptian nationalist Ahmed Hussein for complete independence

The historian Selma Botman describes the state of the late Wafd:

In contrast to the ideologically defined programs of the nonestablishment parties, the Wafd never developed a comprehensive plan to remedy the deep social and economic problems that troubled the country. As this became increasingly apparent, the population began to lose faith in the party, especially as conditions for consumers deteriorated during wartime. Thus, even when the party passed reformist legislation between 1942 and 1944 or 1950 and 1952, it could no longer convince the majority of the population that it held the country's best interests in mind. Instead, in these years of growing politicization of the people, many believed that the Wafd harbored the fear that the nationalist movement would become too radical and go beyond the existing framework of acceptable political and economic discourse.

After decades of pseudo-independence, elitist infighting and deteriorating economic conditions, more radical politics consumed Egypt. The Muslim Brotherhood was founded in 1928, pushing for an Islamic-revival against colonialism and modernity. Leftist movements like the Egyptian Communist Party, Iskra, and the Democratic Movement for National Liberation rallied growing numbers of striking workers, especially as King Farouk's extravagant lifestyle continued to insult the millions of Egyptians living in poverty. The 1945 riots in Egypt and the 1946 student protests demonstrated the need for politicians to negotiate full independence. These protests very quickly took an antisemitic turn, evolving into a prolonged pogrom of Alexandria's and Cairo's Jewish communities, often accompanied with chants of "death to the Jews" and antisemitic conspiracy theories that Jews were receiving beneficial treatment over "real Egyptians." Prime Minister Ismail Sidky and British secretary of foreign affairs Ernest Bevin entered negotiations. However, issues over the status of Sudan and British troops ended hopes for a successful discussion. The ire of the nationalists concentrated on two issues, Sudan and the Suez. By flaming the fires of nationalism, the Egyptian elites forced themselves to intervene in the civil war in Palestine.

During the 1948 Arab-Israeli war, Egyptian troops fought in the southern front against Israel. Though Egypt quickly gained controlled over the Naqab desert, a successful Israeli counter-offensive left Egypt with just the Gaza Strip. During the Faluja pocket, a young Egyptian officer called Gamal Abdel-Nasser made a name for himself as a hero for holding out until the 1949 armistice agreement. Anger over corruption in the war, such as rumors of gun-smuggling leading to Egyptian troops being underequipped for battle. Returning from the war, an Egyptian commander commented: "The real battle is in Egypt."

In 1950, the Wafd formed a government for the last time. After years of martial law and political chaos, the Wafd decisively won the 1950 elections on a mandate of continuing its historic political fight against Britain. al-Nahhas, who was now 70 years old, was no longer the national hero he was in 1919. Genuine economic reforms as well as a final agreement with Britain were the pressing issues of the day, with a faction known as the 'Wafdist Vanguards', attempted to push for reform. In 1950, a poll showed that 60% of Cairo students wanted either 'Islamic socialism', socialism or communism. Even Wafd politician Fuad Sirageddin Pasha announced that the Wafd was now 'socialist'. In practice, corruption continued as party elders maintained their grip on power. A new law limited landowning to 50 feddans, but was not applicable to retroactive land gains and retained ministerial immunity. Fuad Sirageddin Pasha later told the U.S. ambassador: "I own 8000 feddans. Do you think I want Egypt to go communist?" The CIA attempted to pressure King Farouk to adopt reforms suitable to American interests, but failed. Reformers in the party were not strong enough to pass the legislation needed to avoid a total revolution; stubbornness and corruption made the Wafd incapable of delivering to the Egyptian people.

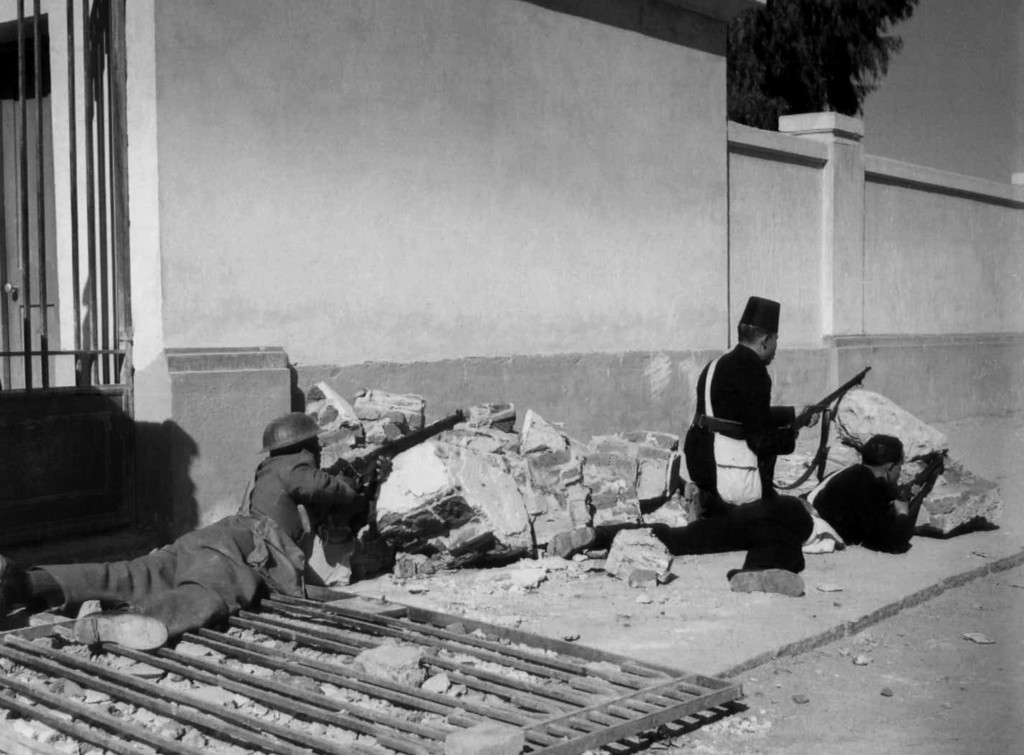
Egyptian police fighting in the Battle of Ismalia

The strategic value of the Suez Canal was too valuable for Britain in the Cold War to completely surrender. In a dramatic move, the Wafd abrogated the 1936 treaty in 1951. Anti-British demonstrations morphed into a small guerrilla war on the canal; 'liberation battalions' battled British forces. The government was rapidly losing control over the situation, as students on the Islamist right and socialist left ignited an inferno of non-violent strikes and violent battles. On January 25, 1952, seven thousand British troops ordered the Egyptian police at Ismalia to surrender their weapons. When the police refused, the resulting Battle of Ismalia left 56 Egyptians and 13 British dead. The next day, a series of riots engulfed Cairo. The Egyptian masses torched 750 foreign-owned stores, causing around 40-50 million Egyptian Pounds worth of damage. Black Saturday was the end for the Wafd; al-Nahhas was dismissed on the next day.

After al-Nahhas, three independent politicians were appointed to clean up the mess and chaos in Egypt. The three governments of Ali Maher (January 27 – March 1), Ahmad Nagib al-Hilali (March 2 – July 2) and Hussein Sirri Pasha (July 2–20) each failed to solve the situation. Maher moved quickly to restore order and calm the economic situation. He created a ministry of rural affairs to study proposals for land reform and lifted curfew restrictions by February. He tried to create a unity government with the Wafd, but they denied his offer of several cabinet positions. His dealings with the Wafd, such as advocating a unity government, alienated his allies to the right and motivated Farouk to deal with him as soon as possible. He was pressured to produce a report on the Cairo Fire that implicated the Wafd as responsible, but refused. The king adjourned parliament and two palace loyalists in the cabinet resigned. The British ambassador refused to meet with Maher, forcing his resignation.

Nagib al-Hilali succeeded Maher, taking a much more active approach. He decreed new anti-corruption laws and created 'purge-committees' to overhaul the bureaucracy. Hilai ordered Fuad Sirageddin under house arrest. A week later, he dissolved parliament, announcing new elections in May. By April, they were postponed indefinitely. The Egyptian journalist Ihsan Abdel Quddous criticized the government, writing "Corruption does not mean corruption of the Wafd government alone". Rumors that the King Farouk was going to sack al-Hilali led him to resign on July 2.

Huseinn Sirri moved as prime minister to lift Sirageddin's house arrest, though he did not promise new elections or to lift martial law. However, events in the military soon were spiraling out of control. In January, in a dramatic election in the officers club, opposition candidates were elected to the Officers Club governing board. In mid-July, Farouk responded by annulling the election and appointing his own men to the board. With a crisis brewing, Sirri offered the War Ministry to General Muhammad Naguib, who was elected club president. When he refused, Sirri resigned on July 20, after failing to persuade Farouk to adopt a more conciliatory pose toward the army. Al-Hilali returned as prime minister on July 22, with the promise of total freedom to select a cabinet. However, when Farouk nominated his own brother-in-law war minister, al-Hilali resigned the next day.

== Free Officer Movement ==
The modern Egyptian army was established as a result of the 1936 Anglo-Egyptian treaty, which allowed the Egyptian army to expand from 398 officers to 982. Nasser applied at the Obassia Military College, Egypt's leading cadet school, in 1937. Anwar Sadat graduated from the Egyptian Military Academy in 1938. Sadat had been trying to form an anti-British uprising since the 1940s, but was arrested after meeting with two Nazi spies in 1942. The humiliating 1942 British coup and the disaster in Palestine motivated the creation of a secret cell of revolutionary Egyptian officers. After the witnessing the 1949 Syrian coup, when Syrian military overthrew the government, whispers of a revolt spread throughout the corps. While an exact date is not known, by 1949 meetings and discussions in the homes of the officers started the beginning of the 'Free Officers' movement. While officers met with communists in the Democratic Movement for National Liberation (DMNL) and Islamists in the Muslim Brotherhood, it was an organization independent of the pre-existing opposition. Members took a vow of secrecy with one hand on the Quran and the other on a revolver, and published anonymous leaflets and articles criticizing the higher command and the government as a whole for corruption. By 1952, it grew so large that few members knew the identities of the leaders of the conspiracy: Colonel Nasser and General Naguib.

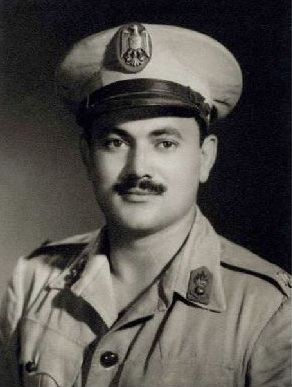
Major Kamal el-Din Hussein (Artillery)

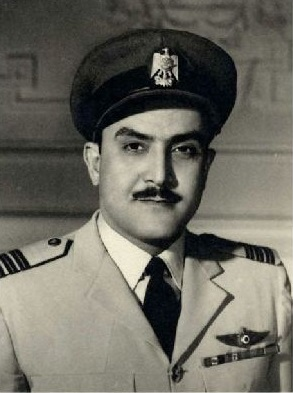
Squadron Leader Hassan Ibrahim (Air force)

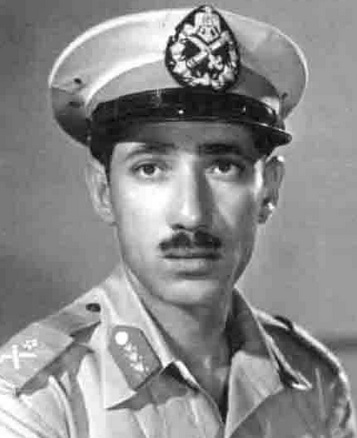
Major Abdel Hakim Amer (Infantry)

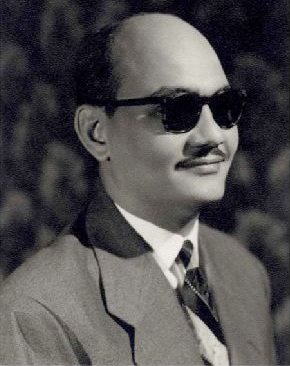
Major Salah Salem (Artillery)

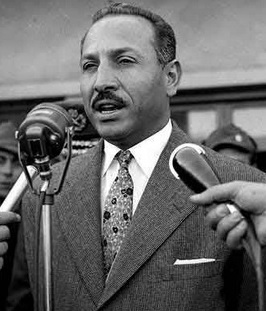
Wing Commander Abd al-Latif al-Boghdadi (Air force)

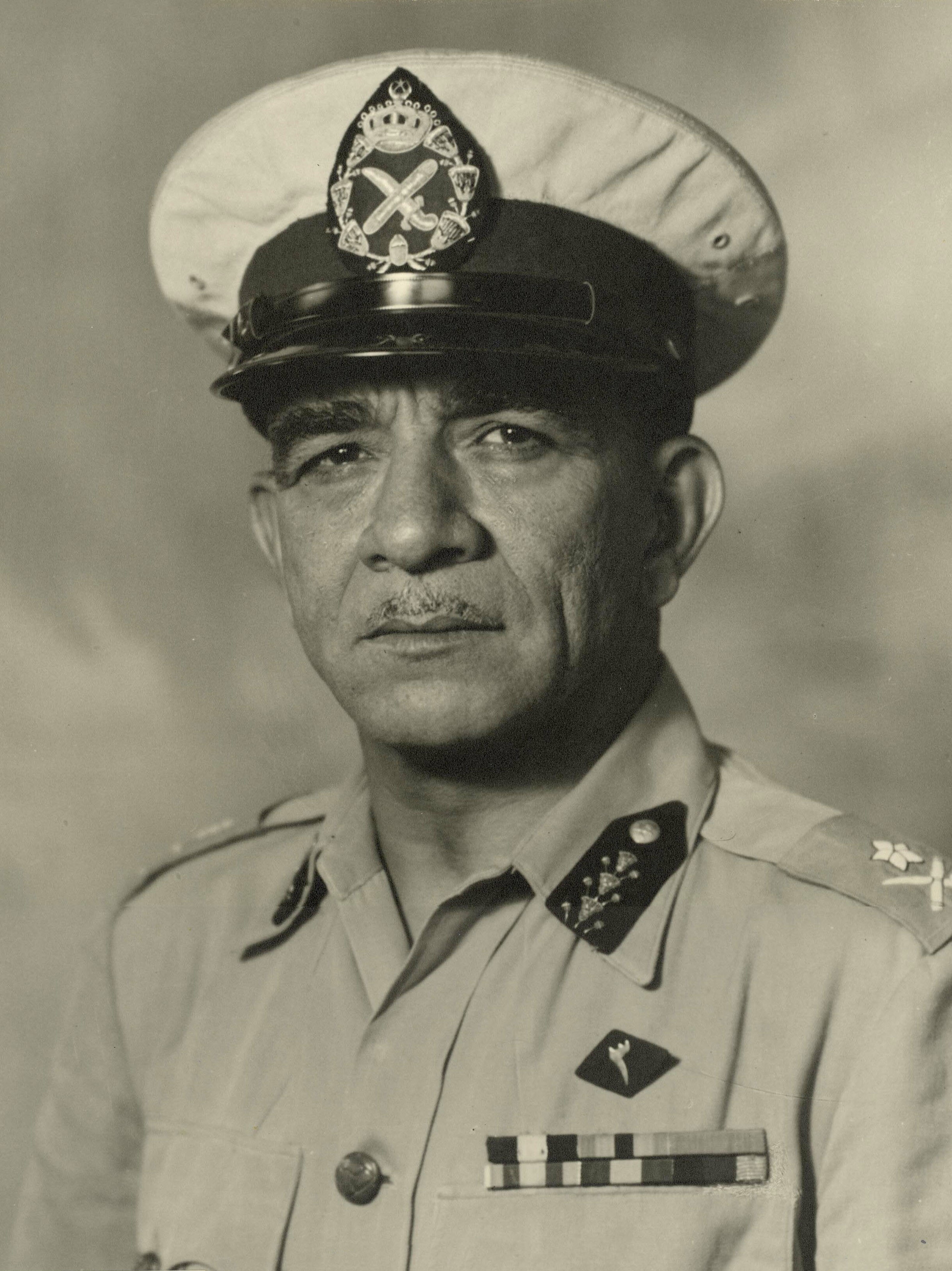
Major General Muhammad Naguib (Border Guards)

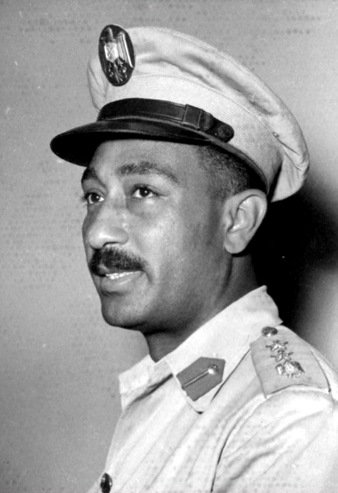
Lieutenant Colonel Anwar El-Sadat (Military Communication)

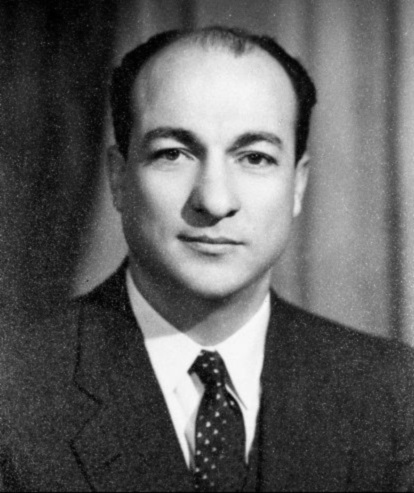
Lieutenant Colonel Zakaria Mohieddin (Infantry)

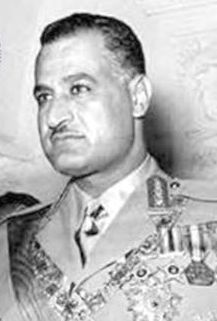
Lieutenant Colonel Gamal Abdel Nasser (Infantry)

The founder of the CIA, Miles Copeland Jr., claimed to have established contacts with the officers at this time, though the historian Said Aburish argues that America did not know about the coup until two days beforehand but did not move to stop it after verifying it was not communist.

== Military coup ==
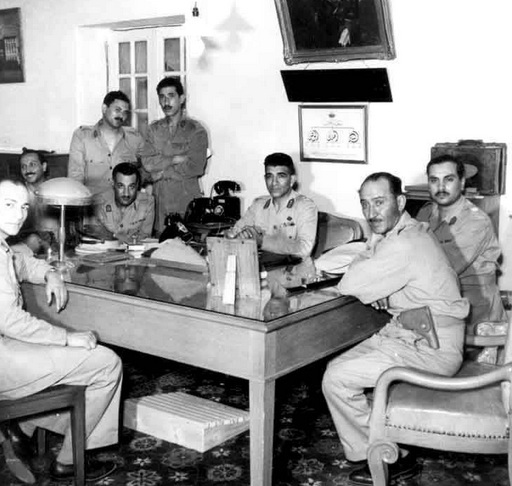
Members of the Free Officers gathered after the coup d'état. From left to right: Zakaria Mohieddin, Abdel Latif Boghdadi, Kamel el-Din Hussein, Gamal Abdel Nasser (seated), Abdel Hakim Amer, Muhammad Naguib, Ahmed Shawki, and Youssef Seddik

By the spring of 1952, the Free Officers began plotting their coup. They had planned to overthrow the monarchy in early August, but events soon made them accelerate their plans. On July 16, King Farouk ordered the governing board of the Officers Club dissolved, causing the officers to fear their arrest was imminent.

On the 23rd, infantry units seized general headquarters and blocked roads leading to Cairo. Nasser and Abdel Hakim Amr, as the higher level leaders, took a car ride to visit every unit in Cairo. After arresting his commanding officer, Muhammad Abu al-Fadl al-Gizawi answered several phone calls as the man he just arrested to assure high command that everything was calm. By 3:00 a.m, Muhammad Naguib arrived at headquarters in Cairo. By 7:00 p.m, Sadat — who was at the movies during the coup — announced on the radio that the Free Officers had taken over; Egypt was now governed by the Revolutionary Command Council.

=== Declaration of revolution ===
At 7:30 a.m., a broadcasting station issued the first communiqué of the coup d'état in the name of Gen. Naguib to the Egyptian people. It attempted to justify the coup, which was also known as the "Blessed Movement". The person reading the message was Free Officer and future president of Egypt Anwar Sadat. The coup was conducted by less than a hundred officers — almost all of which were drawn from junior ranks — and prompted scenes of celebration in the streets by cheering mobs.

Egypt has passed through a critical period in her recent history characterized by bribery, mischief, and the absence of governmental stability. All of these were factors that had a large influence on the army. Those who accepted bribes and were thus influenced caused our defeat in the Palestine War [1948]. As for the period following the war, the mischief-making elements have been assisting one another, and traitors have been commanding the army. They appointed a commander who is either ignorant or corrupt. Egypt has reached the point, therefore, of having no army to defend it. Accordingly, we have undertaken to clean ourselves up and have appointed to command us men from within the army whom we trust in their ability, their character, and their patriotism. It is certain that all Egypt will meet this news with enthusiasm and will welcome it. As for those whose arrest we saw fit from among men formerly associated with the army, we will not deal harshly with them, but will release them at the appropriate time. I assure the Egyptian people that the entire army today has become capable of operating in the national interest and under the rule of the constitution apart from any interests of its own. I take this opportunity to request that the people never permit any traitors to take refuge in deeds of destruction or violence because these are not in the interest of Egypt. Should anyone behave in such ways, he will be dealt with forcefully in a manner such as has not been seen before and his deeds will meet immediately the reward for treason. The army will take charge with the assistance of the police. I assure our foreign brothers that their interests, their personal safety [lit. "their souls"], and their property are safe, and that the army considers itself responsible for them. May God grant us success [lit. "God is the guardian of success"].

With his British support network now neutralized, King Farouk sought the intervention of the United States, which was unresponsive. By the 25th, the army had occupied Alexandria, where the King was in residence at the Montaza Palace. Terrified, Farouk abandoned Montaza and fled to Ras Al Teen Palace on the waterfront. Naguib ordered the captain of Farouk's yacht, al-Mahrusa, not to sail without orders from the army.

Debate broke out among the Free Officers concerning the fate of the deposed king. While some (including Gen. Naguib and Nasser) thought that the best course of action was to send him into exile, others argued that he should be put on trial or executed. Finally, the order came for Farouk to abdicate in favour of his son, Crown Prince Ahmed Fuad – who was acceded to the throne as King Fuad II – and a three-man Regency Council was appointed. The former king's departure into exile came on 26 July 1952 and at 6 o'clock that evening he set sail for Italy with protection from the Egyptian Army.

== Consolidation ==
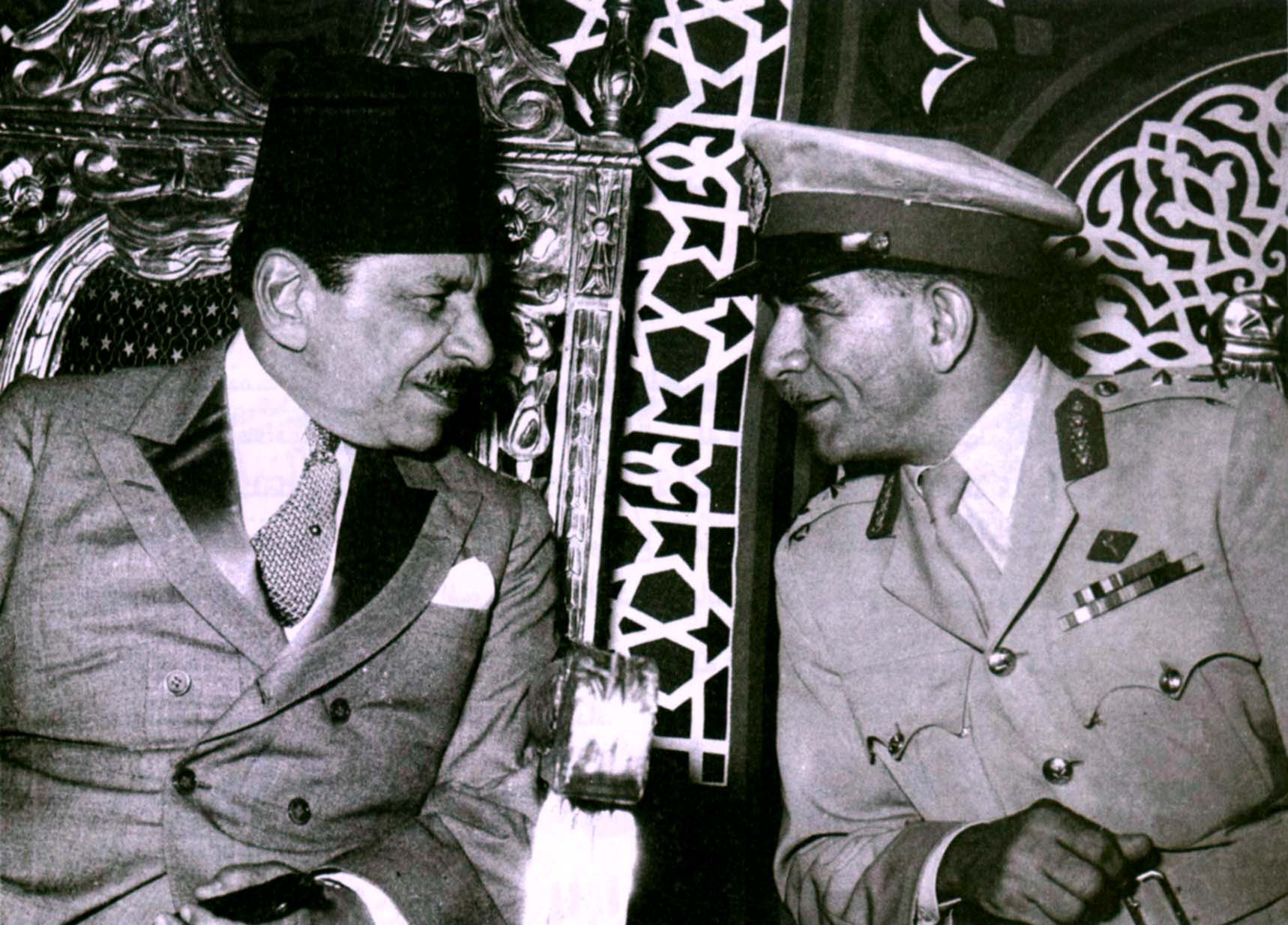
Prime minister Ali Maher and the RCC leader Mohammad Naguib in 1952

The Coup Command Council (CCC), made up of the previous nine-member command committee of the Free Officers in addition to five more members, chaired by Naguib, was formed. Ali Maher was asked to form a civilian government. The first issue was regarding the 1923 constitution. Ali Maher's argument that "immediate return of constitutional procedure" would "leave the country saddled with a defective constitution, an unsuitable electoral system, and an inefficient, party-ridden administration" was understood by the junta. A three-man regency was created to oversee palace affairs consisting of Prince Muhammad Abdel Moneim, Wafdist Bahey El Din Barakat Pasha and Colonel Rashad Mehanna.

The six principles of the RCC were:

1. the elimination of imperialism and its collaborators
2. the ending of feudalism
3. the ending of the monopoly system
4. the establishment of social justice
5. the building of a powerful national army
6. the establishment of a sound democratic system

The officers did not want to simply remove the king and then retreat into a civilian government. The RCC believed that the entire Egyptian system needed to be overhauled, to remove 'reactionary' elements and restore stability. The RCC were not Marxists, but were receptive to the socialist critique of the traditional system. The officers moved to purge their opponents in Egypt to create a new Egypt beyond petty party politics and street violence.

The earliest reforms were populist but symbolic of a new era: the elimination of the government's summer recess to Alexandria, ending the subsidization of private automobiles for cabinet ministers, and the abolition of the honorific titles bey and pasha. Others were more economic, such as tax reforms, pay raises for the military and decreases in rent. The pressing issue of the day was land reform. A ceiling on landholding of 200 feddans was agreed, to lower the price of land and therefore decrease rents. However, the junta butted heads with Ali Maher. Maher believed, like most in the political climate of Egypt, that a complete overhaul of the state was needed. By this time, many Egyptians believed that the 1923 system needed to be completely rebuilt. Maher assumed office with a mandate to further his reforms. The 'illegal-gains' legislation was to be expanded to root out corruption, and 'purge-committees' were created to 'purify' the parties. Maher refused to recall parliament or announce new elections; instead favoring martial law for at least half a year. However, Maher came into conflict with the officers. The junta was skeptical of traditional politicians, and gave Maher a list of nominees to appoint for cabinet positions, which Maher refused. Maher, a landowner himself, instead believed that land redistribution would damage the economy by lowering productivity and discouraging foreign investment. He proposed a revised progressive tax structure on land and a 500 feddan limit, whereby excess land would be taxed at 80%. The landowners suggested a 1,000 feddan limit, with additional exemptions of 100 feddans per wife and son and 50 feddans per daughter.

A 2024 study found that in the aftermath of the coup, officials that were senior and had connections with the deposed monarch were more likely to be purged, while experienced bureaucrats and those with university education were more likely to be retained as part of the government.

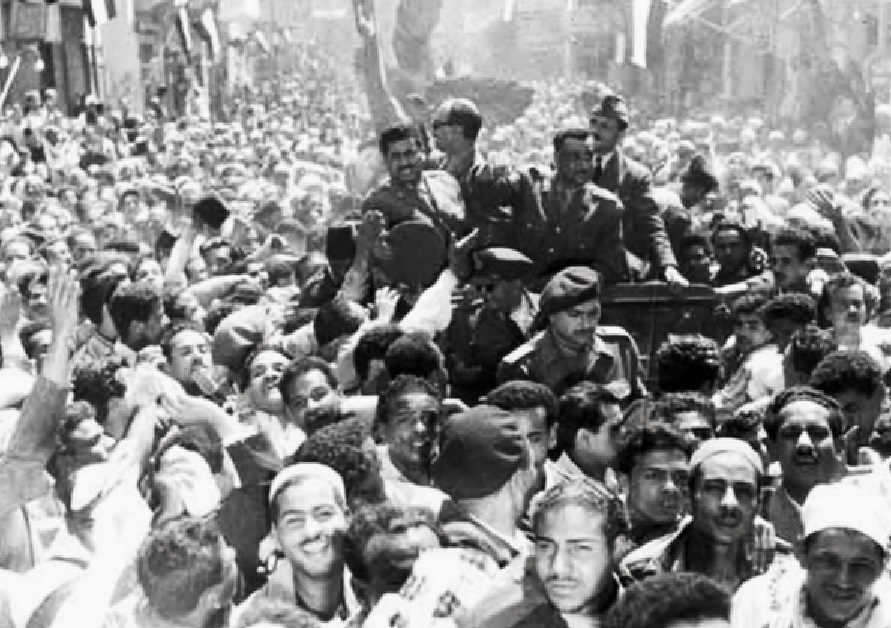
Members of the Free Officers welcomed by crowds in Cairo in January 1953. Standing in the automobile, from left to right: Youssef Seddik, Salah Salem, Gamal Abdel Nasser and Abdel Latif Boghdadi

=== Party 'Purification' ===
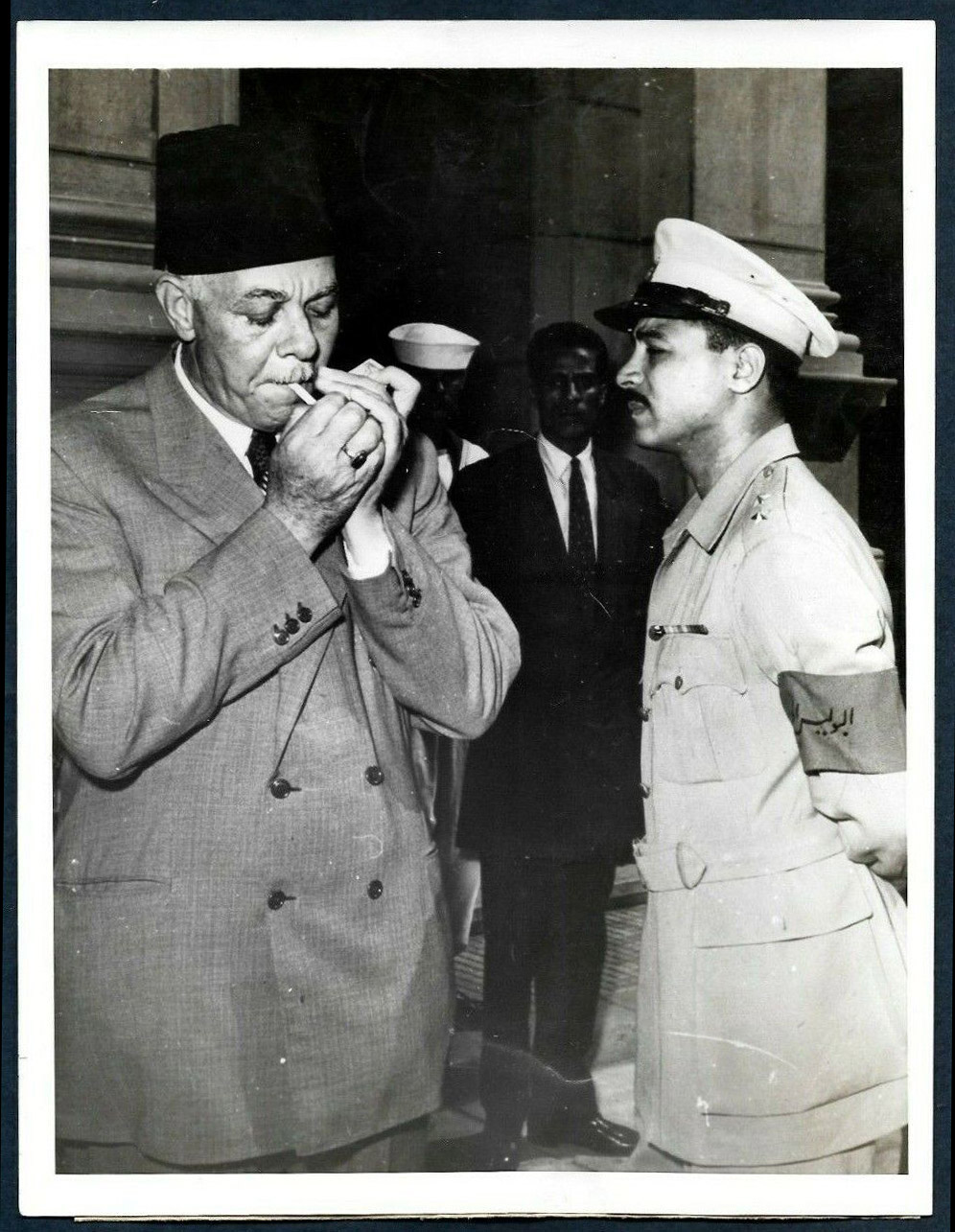
Former Egyptian Prime Minister Abdel Hady, 57, nonchalantly lights a cigarette, following his conviction a week before by Naguib's Military Tribunal.

On September 7, Ali Maher was dismissed, and 64 other politicians, including Foaud Sergeddin, were arrested. The following day the government decreed the 200 feddan limit. At first the Egyptian legal scholar Abd El-Razzak El-Sanhuri was considered to fill in Maher's shoes, but American concerns over Sanhuri's signature in the Stockholm appeal of 1951 led to Naguib's appointment as prime minister. Rashad al-Barawi was also considered, but the American ambassador Jefferson Caffery rejected this idea, calling al-Barawi a 'commie'.

The junta pressed for party reform, the removal of traditional corrupt elements within establishment parties. The Wafd hastily formed a "purge committee", expelling fourteen members, only one of which had any significant power. Old-guard Wafdists resisted the call for purification, while the younger elements supported the removal of the old-guard. On September 9, all parties were dissolved and had to apply for recertification with a list of founding members, financial statements and a party program. Anyone facing corruption charges was automatically ineligible for membership. The RCC refused to accept the Wafd's certification so long as Nahhas, who had refused to meet with Naguib so long as Sergeddin remained in prison, was listed as party president and founder. The Egyptian lawyer Sulayman Hafez summed up the RCC's feelings on Nahhas when he called him a "tumor in the body politic". The September prisoners were released on December 6, the last day they could be held without charge. The case over the recertification of the Wafd went to the State Council on January 10, 1953. On the 17th, the junta announced the abolition of all political parties, where Naguib would rule in a three-year transitional period. The junta justified its decree because of the resistance to 'purification' and the opposition to land reform. The officers had underestimated the resistance by the liberal establishment, and sought to end the 'reactionary mentality' of the old system.

On February 21, Naguib created the constitutional committee of fifty. Ali Maher served as president, who then divided the committee into five subcommittees and appointed a five-man executive committee. By March they had approved the creation of a Republic, ending the regency. However, the committee was not a substitute for parliament; it was not taken seriously by the officers, who announced Egypt was a republic and Naguib was selected as president on June 18, without approval from the committee.

By September, the Revolutionary Tribunal was formed, composed solely of three officers as judges, Abdel Baghdadi, Anwar Sadat and Hasan Ibrahim. In a speech in at Tahrir Square, Salah Salim described how colonialism in Egypt did not rule with soldiers or arms, but "traitors". Salim described the RCC as dedicated to "the struggle against imperialism and the Egyptian traitors who served it cause". Traitors were spreading rumors intending to destabilize the economy and cause hatred towards the army, especially through the universities. While he did not name anyone directly, a mocking imitation of a party leader kissing the King's hand was unmistakably evoking al-Nahhas. Salim's speech best exemplifies the RCC's mentality that student protesters and workers strikes were a part of a counter-revolutionary conspiracy.

Within a week of the speech, the government arrested eleven politicians, and placed Nahhas and his wife under house arrest. The trial of former prime minister and Sa'adist leader Ibrahim Abdel Hady over corruption and the murder of Hasan al-Banna lasted only a week before the court sentenced him to death, later commuted to life imprisonment three day later. Most defendants either received 10–15 year sentences, were stripped of property, or were fined. The most severe sentences were for British collaborators in the Suez insurgency – of the thirteen tried, eleven were convicted, four were hanged, one got a life sentence and the others were sentenced to 10–15 years.

The trial of Fouad Serageddin was more than just the charges – a £EP 5,000 bribe, arms racketeering during the 1948 war, allowing the king to transfer funds outside the country, illegally benefiting from road paving as transport minister in 1945, and conspiring to monopolize the cotton industry – the entire Wafd institution was effectively on trial. The prosecution focused mostly on Serageddin's rise to power within the Wafd and his personal failings in the 1950 government. Serageddin's rivals, the who's who of Egypt's liberal government, took the stand to air out personal grievances. Witnesses included former prime ministers (Naguib al-Hilali, Hussein Sirri, Ali Maher), Mohammed Hussein Heikal, and Makram Ebeid. In his defence, Serageddin positioned himself as a proud nationalist, citing his order to the Ismalia police not to surrender their weapons in 1951. In the end, he received a fifteen-year sentence, but was released in 1956.

When political parties were banned, RCC formed the Liberation Rally, a movement that would subsume all of the preexisting political movements. While it was effective at rallies and speeches, it did not have the same institutional power as the Brotherhood, Wafd or DMNL. The rally remained as a tool for the officers, because of lack of enrollment of the other power brokers in Egypt's political arena.

In opposition to the new constitution with its overt secularism was the Muslim Brotherhood. Additionally, contrary to orders issued by the council, members of the Liberation Rally accumulated much of the seized non-Muslim property and distributed it amongst their closed networks. Angered at being left out of the political and economic spoils and seeing a continuation of secularism and modernity within the Free Officers Movement such as had existed under the King, the Muslim Brotherhood organized its street elements. From June 1953 into the following year, Egypt was wracked by street riots, clashes, arson, and civil tumult as the regime and the Muslim Brotherhood battled for popular support.

=== Anti-leftist crackdown ===
Relations between the RCC and the DMNL were established before the coup. DMNL leader Ahmad Hamrush met with Nasser on July 22, and charged him with mobilizing loyal troops in Alexandria. The DMNL had connections within the military establishment, with around sixty-seventy officers in the military wing, including Khaled Mohieddin. Ahmad Hamrush, leader of the military wing of the DMNL, was not a member of the Free Officers but was given advance knowledge of the coup, later sharing it with the rest of the DMNL.

The first clash between the officers and the labor movement started only a month after the coup. In the city of Kafr al Dawar, local workers went on strike for higher wages, paid leave, an independent elected union, and the dismissal of two members of the managerial staff. Ten thousand workers in the city were on strike, shouting slogans in praise of Mohammed Naguib. The workers burned the homes of company police, destroyed employee files in company offices and medical facilities, and smashed equipment used to test productivity. The police were called, surrounding the factory; the clash between the workers and police left many injured and a few dead. Naguib met with Mustafa al-Khamis, one of the leaders of the strike, and offered him a lesser punishment if he were to give the name of fellow workers. He refused, and was hanged to death on factory grounds, as long with co-conspirator Ahmad al-Bakri on September 7, 1952. His last words were "I was wronged, I want a re-trial." The RCC was convinced that the strike was inspired from outside forces, though there is no evidence that the DMNL ordered the riot.

The Egyptian Communist Party (ECP) opposed the military only a week after the coup. The ECP soon dubbed the army 'the great deception' after it failed to put the king on trial, failed to immediately abolish the monarchy, and failed to immediately restore political rights. Co-founder of the party, Ismail Sabri Abdullah remarked

We were confused first because of two contradicting things. We thought that objectively the overthrow of the King was something very positive but due to our political education we believed that nothing good and durable could come from the army. The army was a tool of oppression, conservative by definition and to us there was nothing that could be called a progressive coup d'etat. We were against coups. We were for revolution. In the first days our position was ambiguous, saluting the overthrow of the King but asking the military to fraternize with the population and form neighborhood committees and village committees of workers and soldiers ... Then there was a strike at Kafr al-Dawwar. The army intervened and two leaders of the strike were hanged. Then we said that this is a fascist regime.

The DMNL, the largest of the leftist parties, was firmly against the RCC after the banning of political parties in early 1953. Public demonstrators at college campuses were detained at the military academy until "they learned how to behave". As early as late 1952, a communist-Wafd coalition in a college student election defeated the Muslim Brotherhood, which was then supported by the RCC. A wave of anti-communist arrests continued throughout 1953–1954. During a trial of ECP members on July 27, 1953, Mahmud Ghannam – the assistant secretary to the Wafd – was chief council for the defense, even demanding to subpoena Nasser, Naguib and other RCC members to question them on why the defendants should be charged for distributing leaflets, when the Free Officers also distributed leaflets before the coup. The officers did not accept this challenge. The court later heard testimony from the Grand Mufti of Egypt, who denounced communism as anti-religion and 'subservise'. While the DMNL tried to create a united front with the remains of the Wafd, this was not seriously materialized. Student protests continued well into the summer of 1954.

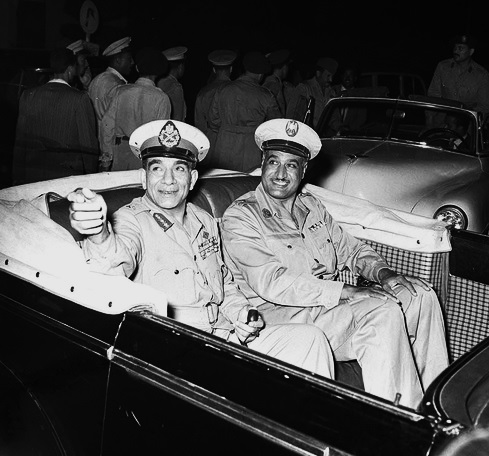
The leaders of the Revolution, Mohamed Naguib (left) and Gamal Abdel Nasser (right) in a car

=== 1954 ===
In January, the Muslim Brotherhood was outlawed. It remained an illegal political organization until the revolution of 2011. The move came in the wake of clashes between members of the Brotherhood and Liberation Rally student demonstrators on 12 January 1954. March witnessed clashes within the RCC, symbolized in the ultimately successful attempt to oust Naguib. The move faced opposition from within the army, and some members of the RCC, especially Khaled Mohieddin, favored a return to constitutional government. On 26 October, an assassination attempt suspected by the Brotherhood was directed at Nasser during a rally in Alexandria. This led to the regime acting against the Brotherhood, executing Brotherhood leaders on 9 December. Nasser subsequently cemented power, first becoming chairman of the RCC, and finally prime minister, with Naguib's constitutional position remaining vague until 14 November, when he was dismissed from office and placed under house arrest.

Meanwhile, the RCC managed to remain united in its opposition to the British and French, specifically in regard to the Suez Canal. Despite continued calls from the RCC, in debates in the United Nations, and pressure from both the U.S. and USSR, the British refused to transfer control of the Canal to the new regime. The RCC began funding and coordinating ever greater attacks on the British and French in the Suez Canal Zone, and Damietta. Finally, on 19 October, Nasser signed a treaty for the evacuation of British troops from Egypt, to be completed over the following 20 months. Two years later, on 18 June 1956, Nasser raised the Egyptian flag over the Canal Zone, announcing the complete evacuation of British troops.

=== 1956 ===
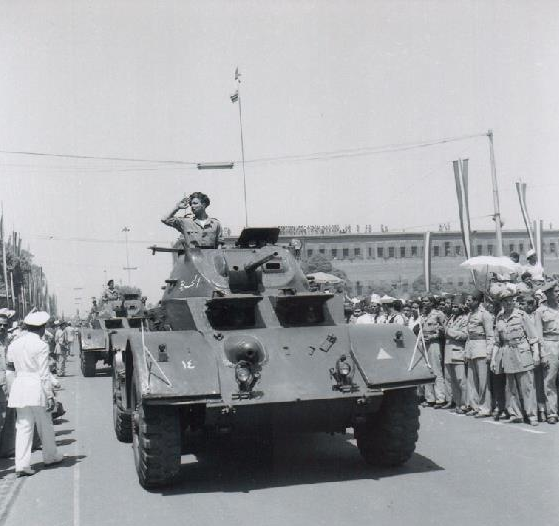
Celebration of the first anniversary of 1952 Egyptian Revolution

President Nasser announced a new Constitution on 16 January at a popular rally, setting up a presidential system of government in which the president has the power to appoint and dismiss ministers. An elections law was passed on 3 March granting women the right to vote for the first time in Egyptian history. Nasser was elected as the second president of the Republic on 23 June. In 1957, Nasser announced the formation of the National Union (Al-Ittihad Al-Qawmi), paving the way to July elections for the National Assembly, the first parliament since 1952.

== Commemoration ==
The anniversary of the coup is commemorated on coup Day, an annual public holiday in Egypt, on 23 July.

== See also ==
- Project FF
- Nasserism
- Egyptian revolution of 1919
- 2011 Egyptian revolution
- June 2013 Egyptian protests
- History of modern Egypt
- List of modern conflicts in the Middle East
- List of Chiefs of the General Staff of Egypt

== Bibliography ==
- Abdalla, Ahmed (1985). The Student Movement and national politics in Egypt: 1923-1973. London: Al Saqi Books. ISBN 978-0-86356-117-7.
- Aburish, Saïd K (2004). Nasser: The Last Arab. St. Martin's Press. ISBN 9780312286835.
- Beinin, Joel; Lockman, Zachary (1988). Workers on the Nile: Nationalism, Communism, Islam, and the Egyptian Working Class, 1882-1954 (1st ed.). Princeton University Press. ISBN 9781850430766.
- Botman, Selma (1991). Egypt from independence to revolution, 1919–1952. Contemporary issues in the Middle East. Syracuse, N.Y: Syracuse University Press. ISBN 978-0-8156-2530-8.
- Botman, Selma (1988). The Rise of Egyptian Communism, 1939-1970. Syracuse University Press. ISBN 9780815624431.
- Botman, Selma (July 1986). "Egyptian Communists and the Free Officers: 1950-54". Middle Eastern Studies. 22 (3): 350–366. doi:10.1080/00263208608700670. JSTOR 4283127.
- Copeland, Miles (1970). The Game of Nations: The Amorality of Power Politics. Simon and Schuster. ISBN 9780671205324.
- Gordon, Joel (2006). Nasser: Hero of the Arab Nation. Oneworld Publications. ISBN 9781851684113.
- Gordon, Joel (1992). Nasser's Blessed Movement: Egypt's Free Officers and the July Revolution (PDF) (1st ed.). Oxford University Press. ISBN 978-0195069358.
- Gordon, Joel (1989a). "The Myth of the Savior: Egypt's "Just Tyrants" on the Eve of Revolution, January-July 1952". Journal of the American Research Center in Egypt. 26: 223–237. doi:10.2307/40000710. JSTOR 40000710.
- Gordon, Joel (1989). "The False Hopes of 1950: The Wafd's Last Hurrah and the Demise of Egypt's Old Order". International Journal of Middle East Studies. 21 (2): 193–214. doi:10.1017/S0020743800032281. ISSN 0020-7438. JSTOR 163074.
- Gordon, Joel (1987). Towards Nasser's Egypt: The Consolidation of the July Revolution and the End of the Old Regime, 1952–1955 (Volumes I and II) (Thesis). University of Michigan.
- Mitchell, Richard P. (1993). The Society of the Muslim Brothers. Oxford University Press. ISBN 978-0195084375.
- Terry, Janice J. (1982). The Wafd, 1919-1952: Cornerstone of Egyptian political power (1st ed.). Third World Centre for Research and Pub. ISBN 9780861990009.
- Watry, David M. (2014). Diplomacy at the Brink: Eisenhower, Churchill, and Eden in the Cold War. Baton Rouge: Louisiana State University Press. ISBN 9780807157190.

=== Memoirs ===
- Muḥyī al-Dīn, Khālid (1995). Memories of a Revolution: Egypt, 1952. American University in Cairo Press. ISBN 9789774243691.
- Sadat, Anwar (1957). Revolt on the Nile. A. Wingate.
- Sādāt, Anwar as- (1978). In search of identity: an autobiography (1st ed.). New York: Harper & Row. ISBN 978-0-06-013742-7.
- Nasser, Gamal (1955). The Philosophy of the Revolution.
- Naguib, Muhammad (1955). Egypt's Destiny: A Personal Statement. Doubleday.
