= Gamal Salem =

Egyptian politician

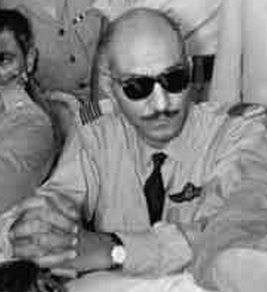
- Gamal Salem following the revolution, 1952

Personal details
- Born: 1918
- Died: 1968 (aged 49–50)
- Occupation: Minister of Communications (1952-54); Deputy Prime Minister (1954-59)

Military service
- Branch/service: Egyptian Air Force
- Rank: Wing Commander

Gamal Salem (1918–1968; Egyptian Arabic: جمال سالم) was an Egyptian military officer and prominent member of the Egyptian Free Officers who led the Egyptian Revolution of 1952 that toppled the monarchy of Egypt and Sudan. Prior to the Revolution, he served as an officer in the Royal Egyptian Air Force.

== Biography ==
Salem was born in 1918. He was a graduate of the Egyptian Military Academy in 1938.

In late 1951, Gamal Salem and Anwar Sadat joined the underground Free Officers movement established by Gamal Abdel Nasser, which later appointed the war hero Mohamed Naguib as its official leader. The purpose of the Free Officers was to depose King Farouk, replace the monarchy of Egypt and Sudan with a revolutionary, nationalist government, and end the British occupation of Egypt and Sudan. The movement achieved the first of these objectives via a coup d'état on 23 July 1952 that launched the Egyptian Revolution of 1952. There was disagreement on what was to be done with the deposed monarch. Although Nasser, Naguib, and most of the other Free Officers argued that Farouk be ceremoniously exiled from Egypt and Sudan (to the King's chosen destination of Italy), Salem favoured the summary execution of Farouk, stating: "A head like Farouk's only interests me when it has fallen," and continually insisted this be carried out. Ultimately, the revolutionaries settled on a peaceful exile for Farouk, and Salem was forbidden by Nasser and Naguib from attending the former King's departure ceremony. Farouk's infant son, Ahmed Fuad, was declared King Fuad II, however, at less than a year old, it was deemed inappropriate for him to be separated from his parents, and so he too departed Egypt with the former King.

Following Farouk's exile, a revolutionary government was formed by the Free Officers, with Naguib as head of the Revolutionary Command Council. Eleven months later, the Free Officers abolished the monarchy, and a republic was declared, with Naguib as President, and Prime Minister. Salem gained the post of Communications Minister. Salem was considered a Nasser loyalist, and strongly opposed Naguib holding power, many times humiliating the latter, and using the Egyptian media against him.

Salem headed the 1952 agrarian reform policy, which limited landownership to only 300 feddans, with compensations for those whose land was expropriated. In February 1954, Salem headed a military court which arrested and tried Armoured Corps officers loyal to Naguib. In late October 1954, following an assassination attempt on Nasser by a member of the Muslim Brotherhood, Salem was chosen to serve as the chief judge of the military court that sentenced eight Brotherhood leaders to death. However, two sentences were later commuted. Following Nasser's election as president in 1956, Salem later served as deputy prime minister.

Salem's health started deteriorating, and his political career faded in 1959 due to his frequent foreign travel for treatment. He died in 1968.

== Bibliography ==
- Aburish, Said K. (2004), Nasser, the Last Arab, New York City: St. Martin's Press, ISBN 978-0-312-28683-5
- Flower, Raymond (1976), Napoleon to Nasser: the story of modern Egypt, Taylor & Francis, ISBN 0-905562-00-3
- Gordon, Joel (1992), Nasser's Blessed Movement: Egypt's Free Officers and the July revolution, Oxford University Press US, ISBN 0-19-506935-8
- Vatikiotis, Panayiotis J. (1978), Nasser and his Generation, Taylor & Francis, ISBN 0-85664-433-1
- Alexander, Anne (2005), Nasser, Haus Publishing, ISBN 978-1-904341-83-3
