= Salah Salem =

Egyptian politician (1920–1962)

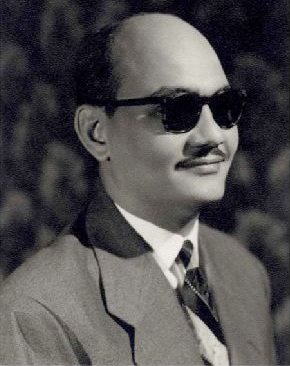
- Salah Salem, 1952

Personal details
- Born: September 25, 1920 Sinkat, Anglo-Egyptian Sudan
- Died: February 18, 1962 (aged 41)
- Occupation: Minister of National Guidance (1953–55) Chief Editor of al-Shaab (1956–60); Chairman of the Press Syndicate (1960)

Military service
- Branch/service: Egyptian Army
- Rank: Major
- Battles/wars: First Arab-Israeli War; Egyptian Revolution of 1952; Suez Crisis

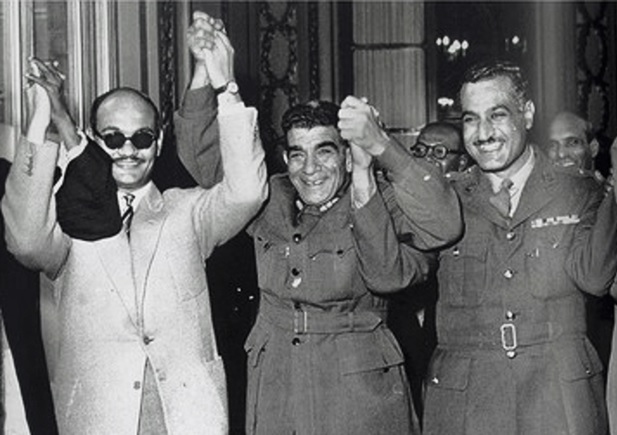
Salah Salem with Muhammed Nagib and Nasser

Salah Salem (Arabic: صلاح سالم; September 25, 1920 – February 18, 1962) was an Egyptian military officer and politician who was a prominent member of the Free Officers Movement that orchestrated the Egyptian Revolution of 1952.

== Early life and military career ==
Salem was born in 1920 to an Egyptian family in Sinkat, Sudan, which was a colony ran by Egypt and Britain under a condominium, at the time. He was raised in the Hilmiyyat Gadida neighborhood of Cairo, where he was educated at the Ibrahimiyyeh School. In 1938, he graduated from the Royal Egyptian Military Academy. He, along with four other future members of the Free Officers, was ranked in the top 10 percent of his classes at the General Staff College by 1947. He graduated from college in 1948. That same year, Salem served in the Egyptian and Sudanese army in the Palestine War as an infantry officer. Salem, Amer and Abdel Latif Boghdadi were included in the eight-member executive committee of the Free Officers.

== Career under Naguib and Nasser ==
In the initial stages of the Egyptian Revolution of 1952 that overthrew King Farouk, Salim was given the task of commanding artillery units in al-Arish. Afterward, he became a member of the Revolutionary Command Council (RCC).

When Mohamed Naguib, the leader of the Free Officers, was selected by the RCC to become President of Egypt in 1953, Salem was given the posts of Minister of National Guidance, and Minister of State for Sudanese Affairs. As part of his National Guidance portfolio, Salem warned the Egyptian press against "rumour mongering", and threatened to suspend the licences of journalists who "deviated from the upright path." Salem was committed strongly to preserving the Egyptian union with Sudan, which was under continual threat by the United Kingdom, which had occupied Egypt and Sudan since the end of the 19th century.

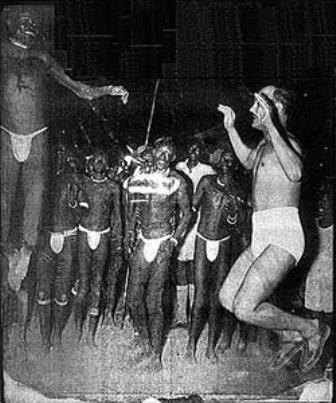
Salah Salem photographed in Sudan in 1954. The photo earned him the nickname the "Dancing Major"

Salem earned the nickname the "Dancing Major" after being photographed dancing with Sudanese tribesmen. Accusations that he was bribing Sudanese politicians later caused Naguib to block Salem's appointment as the Egyptian government's representative in Khartoum.

When Gamal Abdel Nasser assumed the leadership of Egypt in late 1954, following the RCC's removal of Naguib, Salem was dispatched on a tour of Arab capitals, stopping first at Riyadh, where he helped forge a common Egyptian-Saudi Arabian policy of opposition to the British-sponsored Baghdad Pact, and the espousal thereof by the Iraqi government. He condemned Iraq's membership of the Baghdad Pact, saying: "This is a serious development which may threaten the Arab League and expose Arab nationalism to great dangers..." On January 31, 1955, he along with foreign and prime ministers from Lebanon, Jordan, and Syria met with Iraqi Prime Minister Nuri as-Said. The meeting ended with a realisation that the demands of Said's Iraq and Nasser' Egypt were irreconcilable.

In the Suez Crisis of 1956, known in Egypt as the Tripartite Aggression, Salem is said to have demanded that Nasser hand himself over to the British forces invading the country, as a means of ending the war. Nasser ordered Salem, along with Abdel Hakim Amer, to Port Said and berated them in front of their army comrades for breaking down during the invasion and opting for surrender.

In 1957, Nasser appointed Salem the editor of Al-Shaab newspaper. In 1960, Salem was made chairman of the Press Syndicate. Salem died in 1962 of chronic kidney disease, after seeking treatment both in the Soviet Union, and the United States. A major street in Cairo is named after him.

== Bibliography ==
- Aburish, Said K. (2004), Nasser, the Last Arab, New York City: St. Martin's Press, ISBN 978-0-312-28683-5
- Goldschmidt, Arthur (1992), Biographical Dictionary of Modern Egypt, Lynne Rienner Publishers, ISBN 1-55587-229-8
- Gordon, Joel (1992), Nasser's Blessed Movement: Egypt's Free Officers and the July revolution, Oxford University Press US, ISBN 0-19-506935-8
- Podeh, Elie (1995), The quest for hegemony in the Arab world: the struggle over the Bagdad Pact, BRILL, ISBN 90-04-10214-0
