= Revolution Day (Egypt) =

Public holiday in Egypt

- Observed by: Egypt
- Begins: 23 July
- Ends: Same Day
- Date: 23 July
- Next time: 23 July 2027
- Frequency: annual

Revolution Day refers to the public holiday in Egypt on 23 July, the anniversary of the Egyptian Revolution of 1952 which led to the declaration of the modern republic of Egypt, ending the period of the Kingdom of Egypt. It is the biggest secular public holiday in Egypt and is considered the National Day of Egypt.

Annual celebrations marking the Revolution begin on the preceding evening, as the evening of 23 July 1952 was when the Free Officers Movement led by Mohamed Naguib and Gamal Abdel Nasser commenced the military coup d'état that launched the Revolution, and ultimately led to the abdication of King Farouk, the penultimate King of Egypt and the Sudan. The public holiday itself is characterized by large and elaborate celebrations, including military parades and televised concerts with heavily nationalistic themes.

== Historical Background ==
The revolution was launched by the Free Officers Movement, a clandestine group within the Egyptian military composed of nationalist officers. The movement was led by Mohamed Naguib and Gamal Abdel Nasser. On the evening of 23 July 1952, the group staged a military coup d'état, which culminated in the abdication of King Farouk and his exile to Italy.

Following the coup, the monarchy was formally abolished in June 1953, and Egypt was declared a republic with Mohamed Naguib as its first president. The revolution marked the beginning of a new political era in Egypt, shifting the country away from British influence and aristocratic rule.

== See also ==
- Revolution Day in other countries.
