= Egyptian Revolutionary Command Council =

Council that supervised post-monarchy Egypt by the Free Officers

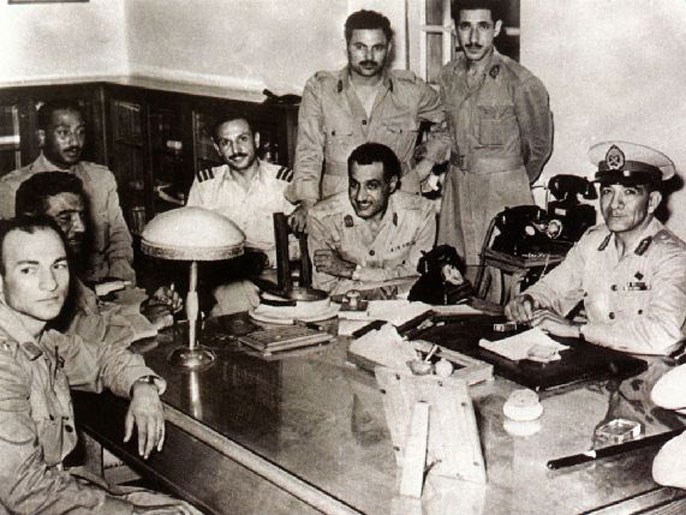

The Revolutionary Command Council (RCC; Arabic: مجلس قيادة الثورة Majlis Qiyāda ath-Thawra) was the body established to supervise the Republic of Egypt and Anglo-Egyptian Sudan after the Revolution of 1952. It initially selected Ali Maher Pasha as Prime Minister, but forced him to resign after conflict over land reform. At that time, the Council took full control of Egypt. The RCC controlled the state until 1954, when the council dissolved itself.

== History ==
RCC initial membership
- Muhammad Naguib: Chairman.
- Gamal Abdel Nasser: Vice-chairman.
- Abdel Latif Boghdady
- Abdel Hakim Amer
- Gamal Salem
- Salah Salem
- Zakaria Mohieddin
- Khaled Mohieddin
- Anwar Sadat
- Hussein el-Shafei
- Hassan Ibrahim
- Kamal el-Din Hussein
- Abdel Moneim Amin
- Ahmed Shawqi
- Lutfi Wahid
- Kamal Rifaat
- Youssef Seddik
- Ahmed Anwar

In July 1952, a group of disaffected army officers (the "Free Officers") led by General Muhammad Naguib and Colonel Gamal Abdel Nasser overthrew King Farouk. The revolutionaries then formed the Egyptian Revolutionary Command Council, which constituted the real power in Egypt, with Naguib as chairman and Nasser as vice-chairman. After assuming power, the Free Officers were not interested in undertaking the day-to-day administration of the Egyptian government. Thus, the Free Officers passed power to Ali Mahir Pasha, a long-time political insider, whom they appointed as prime minister.

Popular expectations for immediate reforms led to the workers' riots in Kafr Dawar in August 1952, which resulted in two death sentences. The Revolutionary Council actually had strong ideological notions, and Mahir was forced to resign in 1952 because he refused to support agrarian reform laws proposed by the council. Naguib assumed full leadership, but, from the beginning, Nasser was a powerful force in the Revolutionary Command Council. Naguib was appointed, first as Commander-in-Chief of the Army, in order to keep the armed forces firmly behind the junior officers' coup. In September, Naguib was appointed Prime Minister of Egypt and a member of the Royal Regent Council, with Nasser acting in the background as Minister of the Interior. Also in September, the Agrarian Reform Law was passed, signalling a major land redistribution program. In December 1952, the 1923 Constitution was abrogated "in the name of the people."

In January 1953, the officers of the RCC dissolved and banned all political parties, declaring a three-year transitional period during which the RCC would rule. A provisional Constitutional Charter which legitimized the RCC was proclaimed on 10 February 1953. A Liberation Rally—the first of 3 political organisations linked to the July regime—was launched soon afterwards with the aim of mobilising popular support.

=== Conflict and change ===
Naguib began to clash with other RCC members over how the Revolution's goals should be implemented. He wanted to phase out the political influence of the military and return the country to civilian rule, believing that the role of the military was not to rule the country, but rather to protect those in power. Following the brief experiment with civilian rule, the Free Officers declared Egypt a republic on 18 June 1953. With land reform fully under way, Naguib announced the official abolition of the Egyptian and Sudanese monarchy and proclaimed himself President of the Republic of Egypt. After the establishment of the republic, Naguib and Nasser began to come into conflict with each other. These troubles culminated in Naguib's resignation from his posts as both president and prime minister. The Revolutionary Command Council then proclaimed Nasser as prime minister; however, they selected no president at that time. Next, the Revolutionary Command Council placed Naguib under house arrest, hoping to prevent any chance that he would return to power.

The Revolutionary Command Council had overstepped its popular support in dealing with Naguib, and large numbers of citizens joined protests demanding that he be reinstated. As a result of these demonstrations, a sizable group within the Revolutionary Command Council demanded that Nasser allow Naguib to return to the presidency and then hold free elections to select a new president and prime minister. Nasser was forced to agree and Naguib reassumed the presidency. Several days later, Nasser was forced to resign as prime minister in favor of Naguib, effectively destroying all progress that Nasser had made towards leadership.

=== End of the council ===
Nasser did use his brief time as prime minister to "purge... pro-Naguib elements in the army", and over the duration of the RCC he gradually consolidated power. Finally, in October 1954, Nasser formally removed Naguib as President and established himself as the effective leader of Egypt. Nasser remained in power over Egypt for the next fifteen years with no major domestic challenges to his power. When Nasser seized power in Egypt, he decided to abolish the council. Thus, on 24 July 1956, the council dissolved itself and announced the end of the Egyptian revolution. The council was replaced by the Supreme Council of the Armed Forces.

== Characteristics ==
The Revolutionary Command Council promoted and implemented "Arab socialism". Arguably, the most notable economic manifestations of Arab Socialism was the land reforms in Egypt in 1952 and the nationalization of major industries and the banking systems in the country. Later, many of these policies were later reversed though. The RCC also tried to further their secular ideology, which led to a conflict with the emerging Muslim radicalism, and argued for modernization, industrialization and the abolishment of the more archaic society and social traditionalism.

== Accomplishments ==
Under the Anglo-Egyptian Treaty of 1936, Britain controlled the Suez Canal. But in 1951, Egypt repudiated the treaty. By 1954, Britain had agreed to pull out. Nasser signed an agreement with Britain that provided for the withdrawal of all British uniformed military personnel from the Suez Canal Zone, although a small civilian force was allowed to temporarily remain. This agreement finally gave Egypt true full independence and ended tensions between Britain and Egypt. Shortly after the treaty with the British, Nasser won forty million dollars in combined financial aid for economic development from the British and Americans.

The Egyptian economy was dominated by private capital until the revolution of 1952. The new government began to reorganize the economy along socialist lines in the late 1950s. The state played an increasing role in economic development through its management of the agricultural sector after the land reforms of 1952. These reforms limited the amount of land an individual or family could own. Financial hurdles delayed the progress of the land reforms. The land reform proposed two basic steps to improve the lot of the Egyptian peasant:

1. dramatic reduction of agricultural rents
2. expropriation of all landed property-holdings above 200 feddâns (1 feddân = 1.038 acres)

In September 1952, the process of land reform in Egypt began. A law was passed that had numerous provisions which attempted to remedy the Egyptian land problems. These were:

- Land owners were prohibited to possess more than 200 feddans of land. However, fathers with more than 2 children were allowed to own 300 feddans.
- A limit on the rental rate for land was set at seven times the land tax value of the plot of land.
- All land leases were given a minimum duration of three years.
- The government established cooperatives for farmers holding less than five feddans. The members of these cooperatives worked together to obtain supplies such as fertilizers, pesticides, and seeds as well as cooperating to transport their products to market.
- A minimum wage for agricultural workers was set at 18 piastres per day.

Additionally, the law provided for the redistribution of any land that owners held over the limits it established:

- Each affected owner would receive compensation for his excess land in government bonds worth a total of ten times the rental value of the land. These bonds would pay three percent interest and mature in thirty years.
- All land bought by the government would be sold to peasants though no person could obtain more than five feddans from the government. Peasants who bought land would pay the government the cost of the land and a 15% surcharge over a period of thirty years.

By the end of 1955, of the total of 567,000 feddâns subject to sequestration, 415,000 feddâns had been expropriated by the government. However, only a part of this land has been distributed among the small landholders, and the government held most of the expropriated land. By the end of 1955, 261,000 feddâns had been reallocated from the government reserve. In addition, 92,000 feddâns had been sold by large to small landowners just prior to the requisition. The government was attempting to organize the beneficiaries of this plan in cooperatives and also to continue the maintenance of the existing irrigation and drainage systems. The land reform of the revolutionary government had undoubtedly benefited the Egyptian peasantry. An Egyptian government source estimated that the new farmers have doubled their incomes, and that setting a limit on rents has reduced the total amount of land rent by $196,000,000.

There was growth in industrial production. Electricity consumption increased from 978,000,000 kW in 1952 to 1,339,000,000 kW in 1954. The cotton yarn output increased from 49,200 to 64,400 tons, and cotton fabric output increased from 157,800,000 meters to 240,900,000 meters. Cement production reached a new high of almost 1,500,000 tons.

== Failures ==
Egypt, under the RCC, never fully implemented socialism. In addition, there was never a fully implemented democracy and a return of the country to civilian rule. Naguib called for this early on, but was thwarted by other forces within the RCC. Naguib's view was that the army could interfere to change a corrupt regime, but it should then withdraw (similar to the actions of the military in the history of Turkey). As Naguib wrote later in his book, Egypt's Fate,

[...] at the age of 36, Abdel-Nasser felt that we could ignore Egyptian public opinion until we had reached our goals, but with the caution of a 53-year-old, I believed that we needed grassroots support for our policies, even if it meant postponing some of our goals. I differed with the younger officers on the means by which to reach our goals, never on the principles.

Nasser, by contrast, thought that any talk of democracy, or of a multi-party system, or of the withdrawal of the army from politics, would allow the Wafd, the Muslim Brotherhood and the other political parties to regain the ground they had lost in 1952. In addition, Egypt became an authoritarian state dominated by the military until the 2011 revolution.

== External articles ==
- "1950 - 1959". ahram.org.e.g.
- James Jankowski, "8. Arab Nationalism in "Nasserism" and Egyptian State Policy, 1952-1958".
- "Egypt at the crossroads domestic stability and regional role". DIANE Publishing. ISBN 1-4289-8118-7
- Joel Beinin, "Was the Red Flag Flying There?". I.B.Tauris, 1990. 350 pages. ISBN 1-85043-292-9
- Mahmud A. "Faksh Education and Elite Recruitment: An Analysis of Egypt's Post-1952 Political Elite". Comparative Education Review, Vol. 20, No. 2 (Jun., 1976), pp. 140–150
- James A. Bill, "The Military and Modernization in the Middle East". Comparative Politics, Vol. 2, No. 1 (Oct., 1969), pp. 41–62. doi:10.2307/421481
- Michael B. Oren, "Escalation to Suez: The Egypt-Israel Border War, 1949-56". Journal of Contemporary History, Vol. 24, No. 2, Studies on War (Apr., 1989), pp. 347–373
