= Kamal el-Din Hussein =

Vice President of Egypt from 1961 to 1964

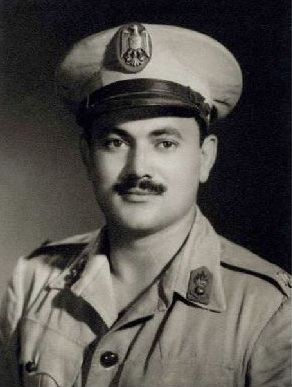
- Hussein in 1952

3rd Vice President of Egypt
- In office 16 August 1961 – 23 March 1964
- President: Gamal Abdel Nasser
- Preceded by: Ali Sabri
- Succeeded by: Anwar Sadat; Hassan Ibrahim

Personal details
- Born: 2 January 1921 Banha
- Died: 16 June 1999 (aged 78)
- Education: Egyptian Naval College
- Occupation: Military officer

Kamal El-Din Hussein (Arabic: كمال الدين حسين; 2 January 1921 – 19 June 1999) was a member of the Egyptian Free Officers who overthrew King Farouk. He served as the 3rd vice president of Egypt from 1961 to 1964.

== Early life and education ==
Kamal El-Din Hussein was born in 1921 in Banha, Qalyubia. He was admitted to military college in 1937. In 1939 he received the bachelor's degree of military science from the Egyptian Military Academy. He served in the field artillery unit in the Western Desert, to fight with the British against the advancing army under Rommel in World War II.

== Political career ==
Hussein was a founding member of the Free Officers, and his rank was major during his membership to the group. He was appointed member of the Egyptian Revolutionary Command Council after the 1952 Revolution. During the presidency of Gamal Abdel Nasser he was named the president of the teachers' syndicate. He was also appointed minister of social affairs in 1954. He was named the minister of education in late 1957 following the elections in October. In February 1958 he submitted his resignation from the ministry of education to Nasser due to the criticisms over the education policies, but it was not accepted by Nasser.

Hussein led the National Guard to defend Ismailia during the Suez War. In 1964 he resigned from his post as vice president and minister of local governments. His main reason was the Egyptian intervention in the Yemen War. During Anwar El-Sadat's presidency he was elected in 1971 to the People's Assembly. After criticizing Sadat's government, he was dismissed from the People's assembly in 1978 and therefore also prevented from further elections. In 1983 he made a tour with Yasser Arafat through Arab countries to end hostilities between different Palestinian factions throughout the Arab world.

== Death ==
Hussein was diagnosed with liver cancer. He died on 19 June 1999. His funeral was attended by the Egyptian President Hosni Mubarak.

=== Awards ===
Hussein was the recipient of the Grand Collar of the Order of the Nile which was awarded to him in 1956.
