= Free Officers movement (Egypt) =

Military group that launched the 1952 Egyptian Revolution

Free Officers Movement
- حركة الضباط الأحرار
- The flag of the Egyptian Revolution and Egypt (1953–1958)
- Active: 1949–1953
- Countries: Kingdom of Egypt (United Kingdom) Anglo-Egyptian Sudan
- Engagements: 1948 Arab–Israeli War; 1952 Egyptian Revolution

Commanders
- Commanders: Mohamed Naguib; Gamal Abdel Nasser; Abdel Hakim Amer; Abdel Latif Boghdadi; Zakaria Mohieddin

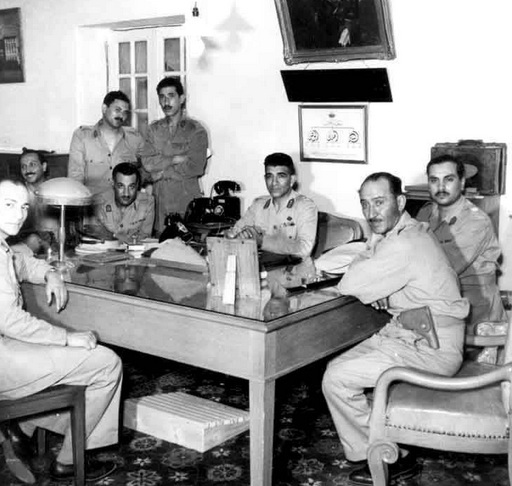
The Free Officers after toppling the monarchy, 1953. Counterclockwise: Zakaria Mohyeddin, Abdel Latif Boghdadi, Kamal Eddine Hessien (standing), Gamal Abdel Nasser (seated), Abdel Hakim Amer, Mohamed Naguib, Youssef Sedeek and Ahmed Shawki

The Free Officers (Arabic: حركة الضباط الأحرار, romanized: Ḥarakat al-dubbāṭ al-ʾaḥrār) were a group of revolutionary Egyptian nationalist officers in the Egyptian Armed Forces and Sudanese Armed Forces that instigated the Egyptian revolution of 1952 (also known as the 1952 coup d'état). Initially started as a small rebellion military cell under Abdel Moneim Abdel Raouf, which included Gamal Abdel Nasser, Hussein Hamouda, Khaled Mohieddin, Kamal el-Din Hussein, Salah Nasr, Abdel Hakim Amer, and Saad Tawfik, it operated as a clandestine movement of junior officers who were veterans of the Palestine War of 1948–1949 as well as earlier nationalist uprisings in Egypt in the 1940s.

The nationally respected Arab-Israeli War veteran Mohamed Naguib joined the Free Officers in 1949. Naguib's hero status, and influence within the army, granted the movement credibility, both within the military and the public at large. He became the official leader of the Free Officers during the turmoil leading up the revolution that toppled King Farouk in 1952. The Movement was succeeded by the Revolutionary Command Council after the overthrow of Farouk that was later succeeded by the Supreme Council of the Armed Forces.

== Background ==
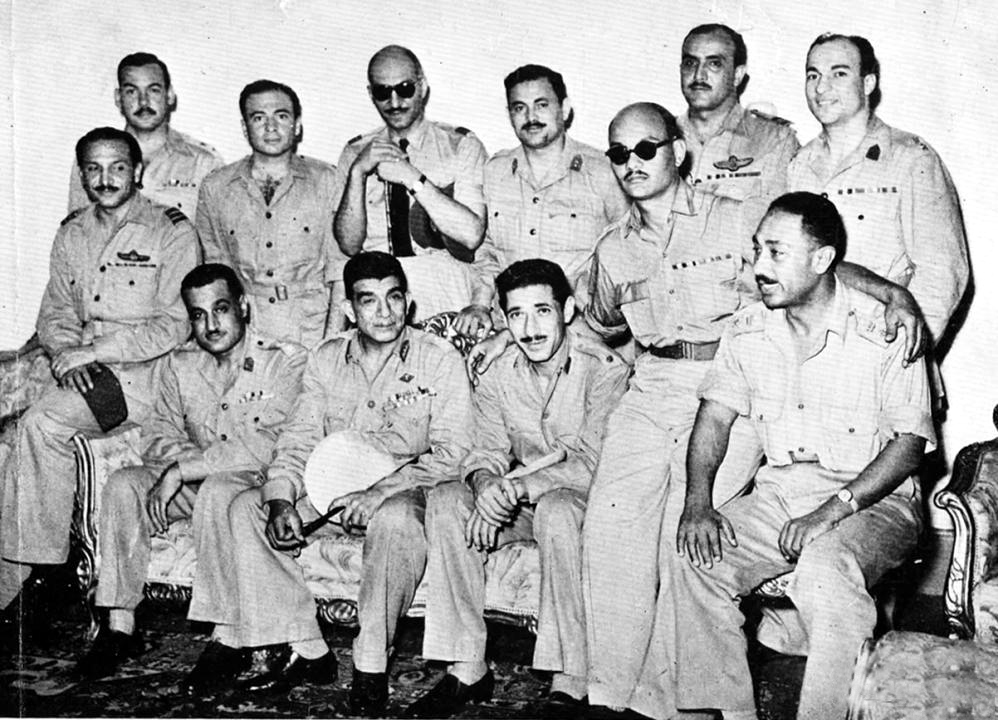
Front row from left: Abdel Latif Boghdadi, Gamal Abdel Nasser, Mohamed Naguib, Abdel Hakim Amer, Salah Salem. Mohamed Anwar Sadat. Back row from left: Hussein el-Shafei, Khaled Mohieddin, Gamal Salem, Kamal el-Din Hussein, Hassan Ibrahim, Zakaria Mohieddin.

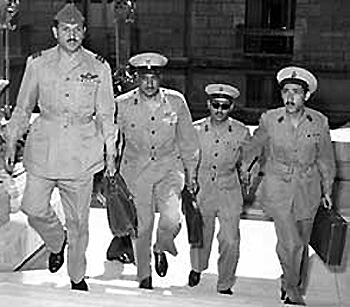
Abdel Latif Boghdadi (left) Gamal Abdel Nasser (center left) Salah Salem (center right) Abdel Hakim Amer (right).

The Great Depression affected national economies around the globe, including those of Egypt and Sudan. During this time, the Great Powers in the Arab World and Middle East began removing institutions for economic development after no positive advancement became evident. This encouraged many political groups to organize against the politicians who dominated the parliamentary politics of the time. Workers had become accustomed to development efforts which were meant to stabilize the economies of the region. These state-led initiatives set the standard for what the people expected of their government, including the regulation of imports, industrial investment, commodity distribution, production supervision.

== Formation ==
Politicians and government bodies were forced to respond to the demands of groups who were directly affected by the initiative changes and withdrawals. Some of these groups included military officers. While the first military coups began in Syria in the late 1940s, it was the Free Officers coup in Egypt and the revolution of 1952 that would have the greatest impact, and encourage later movements. The members were not from the wealthy elite, but rather the middle class, young workers, government officials and junior officers. The movement, which began and spread throughout the 1940s, came to fruition with the leadership of Gamal Abdel Nasser. Nasser, who commanded the loyalty and respect of the other members, formed a coordinating committee (1949), which he was later asked to lead (1950).

Coming from a modest background, he represented the group's majority: the hard-working middle class. The Free Officers consisted of urban dwellers and educated militants with a lower-middle-class upbringing. Nasser was a war hero who rose quickly in military rank to colonel. He, like many others, dedicated his time and energy to reversing the corruption seen on the part of the government throughout the 1947–1949 Palestine war by restoring a democracy. He saw the problem of domestic passivity towards imperialism as being as much a problem as imperialism itself.

The Free Officers strengthened a "new" middle class. Due to this dedication to change, the Free Officers referred to their group and its entirety as simply a "movement." Later however, it would become a revolution. The Free Officers Committee enlisted General Muhammad Naguib as a public figurehead in preparation for the successful coup of 23 July 1952. The men who had constituted themselves as the Committee of the Free Officers Movement and led the 1952 Revolution were Lieutenant Colonel Gamal Abdel Nasser (1917–70), Major Abdel Hakim Amer (1919–67), Lieutenant Colonel Anwar El-Sadat (1918–81), Major Salah Salem (1920–62), Major Kamal el-Din Hussein (1921–99), Wing Commander Gamal Salem (1918–2001), Squadron Leader Hassan Ibrahim (1917–90), Major Khalid Mohieddin (1922–2018), and Wing Commander Abdel Latif Boghdadi (1917–99); Major Hussein el-Shafei (1918–2005) and Lieutenant Colonel Zakaria Mohieddin (1918–2012) joined the committee later.

== Rise ==
In 1951, while operating covertly within the military, the Free Officers formulated a six-point plan to direct their administration following the coup. The program called for the overthrow of British rule in Egypt, the elimination of Egyptian feudalism, the end of the political control of Egypt's government by foreign capital, the establishment of social justice, the formation of a strong national army and the creation of a healthy democratic society.

The continued agitation within Egypt as a result of British control led to a series of skirmishes in which British military outposts were attacked. During 1950–52, Arab fedayeen in the Suez Canal Zone engaged in guerilla operations against British forces. The pro-British Egyptian government in Cairo issued a public warning to fedayeen not to continue their activities. Despite this, attacks were made against the British garrison and the Egyptians who worked with them. At this point, Egyptian nationalist groups were divided and disorganised. The military was the only area that still held some sort of organised mission, which led to the revolution of 1952. The revolutionaries publicised the need for reform and social justice, marched on Cairo and forced King Farouk to abdicate his throne. The revolution led to the end of British control over Egypt, which had begun in 1882 during the Anglo-Egyptian War.

== Legacy ==
Similar movements were organised by other groups of junior officers seeking to mimic the Free Officers' ascent to power. In Iraq, a faction of Arab and Iraqi nationalist officers, who referred to themselves as the "Free Officers", toppled the pro-British Hashemite government of Nuri al-Said and Faisal II in 1958. Said and Faisal, Nasser's chief regional rivals at the time, were both killed during the coup. In 1963 some of the same officers aligned themselves with the Ba'ath Party and overthrew the government of Abd al-Karim Qasim, who was killed by the organizers of the coup.

In Syria, a coalition of Arab nationalist officers, including Nasserists, Ba'athists, and independents, toppled the secessionist government of Nazim al-Qudsi in 1963 and vowed to restore the union with Egypt in the United Arab Republic (1958–1961). In Saudi Arabia during the 1960s Prince Talal invoked a similar idea, the Free Princes Movement, in an unsuccessful effort to overthrow his country's conservative monarchy. He was exiled to Egypt as a result and was given asylum by Nasser.

Then Libyan leader Muammar al-Gaddafi used a similar group to overthrow the Libyan King Idris in 1969.

The anniversary of the Egyptian revolution of 1952 led by the Free Officers is commemorated as Revolution Day, an annual public holiday in Egypt on 23 July.

The name was consciously assumed by the Free Officers and Civilians Movement, led by Brigadier-General Najib al-Salihi who opposed Saddam Hussein.

== Members ==
This is a list of some of the major officers of the movement:

- Major General Muhammad Naguib (Border Guards)
- Brigadier General Youssef Seddik (Infantry)
- Lieutenant Colonel Gamal Abdel Nasser (Infantry)
- Lieutenant Colonel Anwar El-Sadat (Military Communication)
- Lieutenant Colonel Zakaria Mohieddin (Infantry)
- Major Abdel Hakim Amer (Infantry)
- Major Salah Salem (Artillery)
- Major Kamal el-Din Hussein (Artillery)
- Major Khalid Mohieddin (Armoured Corps)
- Major Hussein Al Shafei (Armoured Corps)
- Wing Commander Gamal Salem (Air force)
- Wing Commander Abd al-Latif al-Boghdadi (Air force)
- Squadron Leader Hassan Ibrahim (Air force)
- Major Mashhour Ahmed Mashhour (Military Engineering)
- Captain Abdel Moneim Abdel Raouf (Air force)
- Amin Shaker (Military Communication)
- Aly Mansour (Air Force)
- Mounier Shash (Artillery)
- Major General Mohamed Uthman (Infantry)
- General Ali Elbana
- Major Hamdy Ebeid

== See also ==
- Egyptian revolution of 1952
- Egyptian Revolutionary Command Council
- History of Modern Egypt
- Free Officers Movement (Libya)
