= Hassan Ibrahim =

Vice President of Egypt from 1964 to 1966

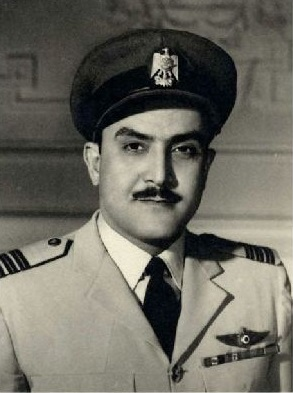
- Ibrahim in 1952

4th Vice President of Egypt
- In office 17 February 1964 – 27 January 1966
- President: Gamal Abdel Nasser
- Preceded by: Hussein el-Shafei
- Succeeded by: Ali Sabri

Personal details
- Born: 1917 Alexandria
- Died: 1990 (aged 72–73)
- Education: Egyptian Air Academy
- Occupation: Military officer

Hassan Ibrahim (Arabic: حسن إبراهيم; 1917– 1990) was an Egyptian Air Force officer and one of the founders of the Free Officers movement who served as the fourth vice president of Egypt from 1964 to 1966.

== Early life and education ==
Ibrahim was born in Alexandria in 1917. He graduated from the Egyptian Air Academy in 1927.

== Free Officers Movement ==
Ibrahim was among five military officers who formed the first cell of the Free Officers movement in July or September 1949. Although it is argued that Ibrahim along with other officers was a member of the Muslim Brotherhood's special unit from 1944 to 1945, there is another report stating that Ibrahim was part of the group called Young Egypt. In addition, Ibrahim was one of the nine-member leadership group of the Free Officers movement. The movement led the 1952 Revolution. Then Ibrahim became a member of the 14-member Revolution Command Council that was charged with the running of Egypt following the success of the revolution.

== Career ==
Ibrahim participated in the Palestinian war in 1948. In 1952 he served as an Air Force group captain. In 1954 he led the group who expelled President Mohamed Naguib from Abdeen Palace. He was one of the three judges, who tried the members of the Muslim Brotherhood after their attempted assassination attack against President Gamal Abdel Nasser in 1954. The other judges were Anwar Sadat and Abdel Latif Boghdadi.

Ibrahim was also appointed minister for presidential affairs in 1954. Two years later, in 1956, he was named the head of the Egyptian economy agency. After dealing with business for a while, in February 1964, he was appointed as one of seven vice deputies of President Nasser. Ibrahim joined the Arab Socialist Union in 1962 when the party was established and was one of the sub-secretaries for its finance and commerce department. The other sub-secretary of the department was Abdul Munim Qaysuni, an economist. Ibrahim's tenure as vice deputy ended in 1966 when Nasser asked him to end his extramarital relationship, and Ibrahim continued business activities.

== Later years and death ==
In 1975, Ibrahim gave a series of interviews to Egyptian author Sami Gohar which were published as a book titled The Silents Speak: Abdelnasser and the Massacre of the Muslim Brotherhood. In the book Ibrahim harshly criticized Gamal Abdel Nasser. He died in 1990.

== Honour ==
Ibrahim was the recipient of the Grand Collar of the Order of the Nile which was awarded to him in 1956.

=== Foreign honour ===
- Malaysia:
  - Honorary Grand Commander of the Order of the Defender of the Realm (SMN (K)) - Tun (1965)
