= Said Aburish =

Palestinian journalist and writer (1935–2012)

Said Muhammad Khalil Aburish (Arabic: سعيد محمد خليل أبو الريش; 1 May 1935 – 29 August 2012), was a Palestinian journalist and writer. Aburish was born in al-Eizariya (also known as "Bethany") in 1935, and he and his family moved to Beirut in 1948; during the 1948 Arab–Israeli War, and through the years 1948–67, the site was controlled by Jordan. Aburish attended school in Jerusalem and Beirut. He returned to Beirut in the 1950s as a reporter for Radio Free Europe and the London Daily Mail. He returned to al-Eizariya in 2009, dying there in 2012.

== Writings ==
Over the years, Aburish wrote extensively about the Israeli–Palestinian conflict, and his works on the subject include Cry Palestine, Children of Bethany and The Forgotten Faithful: The Christians of the Holy Land. Aburish wrote a trio of biographies regarding three of the most prominent Arab presidents, Nasser: The Last Arab, Arafat: From Defender to Dictator and Saddam Hussein: The Politics of Revenge. Aburish was also a strong critic of the Saudi royal family, most notably in the book The Rise, Corruption and Coming Fall of the House of Saud.

== Reception ==
Aburish garnered both praise and criticism for his style, with critics accusing him of "hyperbole". Aburish considered his work "revisionist history"; according to Douglas Martin of The New York Times, however, Aburish "reported facts and interpretations that were essentially truisms in the Arab world"—but "novel to Western readers." In The Guardian, Andrew Lycett wrote that Aburish "did much to illuminate the relationship between the Middle East and the west." Reviewing Aburish's A Brutal Friendship for Commentary, Daniel Pipes remarked that Aburish's analysis of Arab society was "brief and superficial," arguing that Aburish's primary goal was to attribute the problems of the Arab world "to a vast British and American conspiracy." Despite this, Pipes concluded "outlandish as it may be, the book represents a main line of Arab thinking" and therefore "cannot be so easily dismissed." By contrast, Kathy Evans praised A Brutal Friendship in The Observer: "For several decades now, [Aburish] has been making Arab governments wince with pain and embarrassment. Why? Because among Arab authors, he is almost alone in speaking the truth." In a favorable review, Publishers Weekly opined that while some of the material in Aburish's Saddam Hussein was "controversial," Aburish's account was "detailed, balanced," and "credible" given "Aburish's extensive contacts in the Arab world." Publishers Weekly called Aburish's prose "appropriately dramatic but not sensational." Elie Podeh, reviewing Aburish's Nasser for the International Journal of Middle East Studies, criticized Aburish for "factual mistakes" and "misuse of sources," stating that "Aburish has ignored new sources ... based on declassified archival material" in favor of "outdated studies as well as several biased interviews, which he accepts at face value." While acknowledging that Nasser "may be a good introduction to readers unfamiliar with the subject," Podeh commented "serious students ... will have to wait for another biography."

== Publications ==
- Aburish, Said K.: Pay-off: Wheeling and dealing in the Arab world, A. Deutsch 1985. ISBN 978-0233977799
- Aburish, Said K.: Children of Bethany: The Story of a Palestinian Family, Indiana University Press 1988. ISBN 978-0-253-30676-0
- Aburish, Said K.: The St. Georges Hotel Bar, International Intrigue in Old Beirut, An Insider's Account, London, Bloomsbury Publishing, 1989.
- Aburish, Said K.: Cry Palestine: inside the West Bank, Bloomsbury, London 1991. ISBN 978-0-7475-1005-5
- Aburish, Said K.: The Forgotten Faithful: the Christians of the Holy Land, Quartet, London, 1993. ISBN 978-0-7043-7036-4
- Aburish, Said K.: Rise, Corruption and Coming Fall of the House of Saud, Bloomsbury, London, 1994. ISBN 978-0-7475-1468-8
- Aburish, Said K.: Brutal Friendship: The West and the Arab Elite, Victor Gollancz Ltd, London, 1997. ISBN 978-0-575-06275-7
- Aburish, Said K.: Arafat: From Defender to Dictator, Bloomsbury Pub. Ltd. (UK), 1998. ISBN 978-1-58234-049-4
- Aburish, Said K.: Saddam Hussein: The Politics of Revenge, Bloomsbury Pub., New York, U.S.A., 1999. ISBN 978-1-58234-050-0
- Aburish, Said K.: Nasser: the Last Arab, Thomas Dunne Books/St. Martin's Press, New York 2004. ISBN 978-0-312-28683-5
