= Mohamed Naguib =

President of Egypt from 1953 to 1954

His Excellency Major General Mohamed Naguib
- محمد نجيب
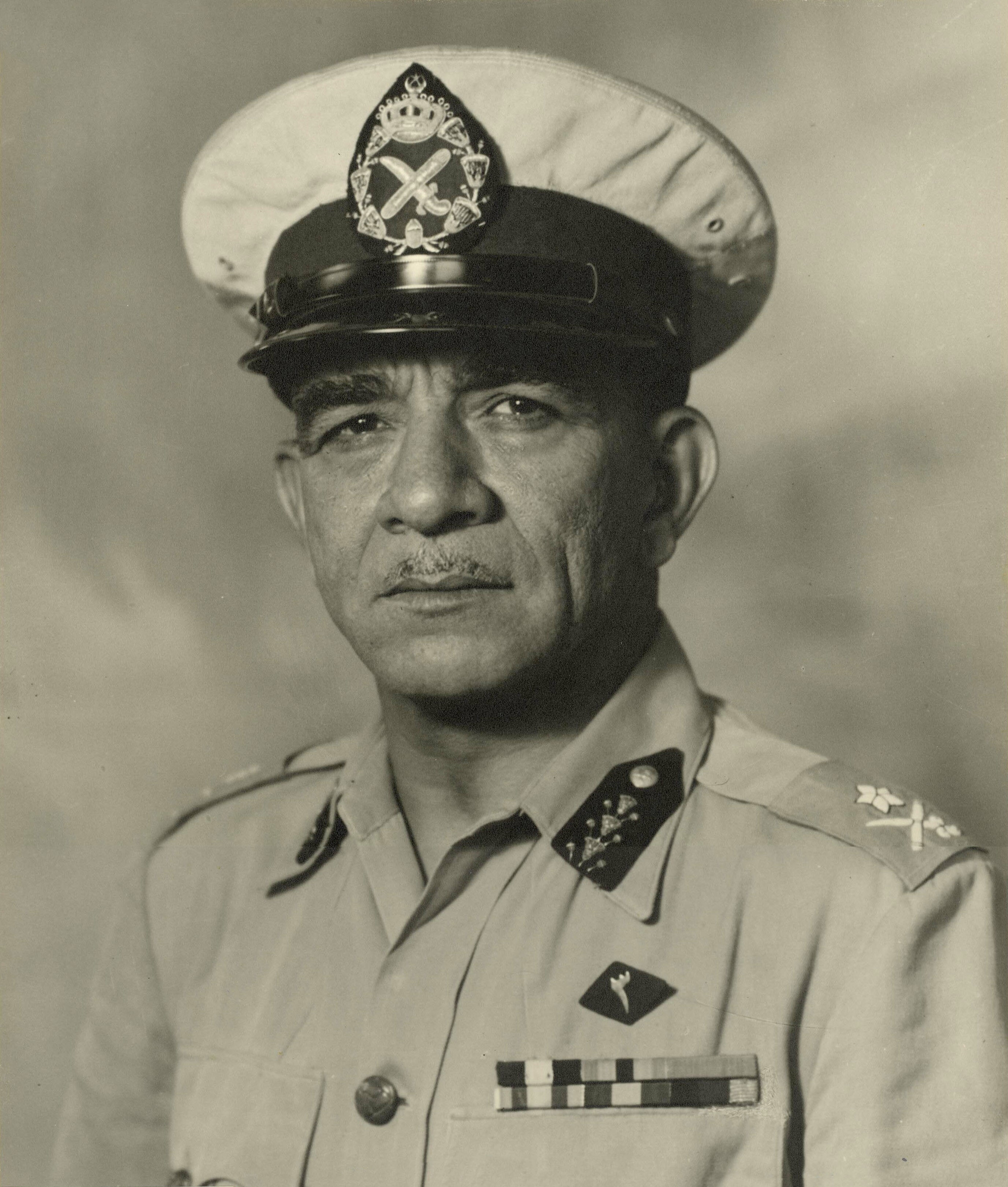
- Official portrait, c. 1954

1st President of Egypt
- In office 18 June 1953 – 14 November 1954
- Prime Minister: Himself; Gamal Abdel Nasser
- Preceded by: Position established (Fuad II as King of Egypt)
- Succeeded by: Gamal Abdel Nasser

30th Prime Minister of Egypt
- In office 8 March 1954 – 18 April 1954
- President: Himself
- Preceded by: Gamal Abdel Nasser
- Succeeded by: Gamal Abdel Nasser
- In office 7 September 1952 – 25 February 1954
- Monarch: Fuad II (until 18 June 1953)
- President: Himself (from 18 June 1953)
- Preceded by: Ali Maher
- Succeeded by: Gamal Abdel Nasser

Minister of War and Navy
- In office 7 September 1952 – 18 June 1953
- Prime Minister: Himself
- Preceded by: Ali Maher
- Succeeded by: Abdel Latif Boghdadi

Personal details
- Born: 19 February 1901 Khartoum, Anglo-Egyptian Sudan
- Died: 28 August 1984 (aged 83) Cairo, Egypt
- Cause of death: Liver cirrhosis
- Party: Military/Liberation Rally
- Spouse(s): Zaynab Ahmed Aisha Naguib (m. 1934; died 1971)
- Children: 4
- Awards: Order of the Nile; Order of the Republic

Military service
- Allegiance: Sultanate of Egypt; Kingdom of Egypt; Republic of Egypt
- Branch/service: (Egypt) Egyptian Army
- Years of service: 1918–1954
- Rank: Major General
- Unit: Infantry
- Battles/wars: Abdeen Palace incident of 1942; 1948 Arab–Israeli War; Battles of Negba; Operation Pleshet; Battle of Nitzanim; Battle of Hill 86; Egyptian Revolution of 1952

Mohamed Naguib Youssef Qutb El-Qashlan (Arabic: محمد نجيب يوسف قطب القشلان; 19 February 1901 – 28 August 1984), known simply as Mohamed Naguib (Arabic: محمد نجيب), was an Egyptian military officer and revolutionary who was the principal leader of the Free Officers movement of 1952 that toppled the monarchy of Egypt and the Sudan, leading to the establishment of the Republic of Egypt. He was the first President of Egypt.

A distinguished and decorated general who was wounded in action in the 1948 Arab–Israeli War, he became the leader of the Free Officers Movement of nationalist army officers opposed to the continued presence of British troops in Egypt and Sudan, and the corruption and incompetence of the monarchy under King Farouk. Following the toppling of Farouk in July 1952, Naguib went on to serve as the head of the Revolutionary Command Council, the Prime Minister of Egypt, and later its first president, successfully negotiating the independence of Sudan (hitherto a condominium of Egypt and the United Kingdom), and the withdrawal of all British military personnel from Egypt. His tenure as president came to an end in November 1954 due to disagreements with other members of the Free Officers, particularly Nasser, who forced him to resign and succeeded him as president.

== Early life and education ==
Mohamed Naguib was born on 19 February 1901 in Khartoum, Anglo-Egyptian Sudan, to Youssef Naguib and a Zohra Ahmed Othman. Zohra was from an Egyptian military family which lived in Omdurman, as her father and her brother were Egyptian officers who served there. While Youssef was a ranking officer of the Egyptian Armed Forces who had come from a notable Egyptian family of army officers. Naguib was the eldest of nine children. Mohamed Naguib's origins trace back to Gharbia Governorate.

Naguib attended secondary and military schools at Gordon Memorial College in Khartoum, graduating in 1918. He joined the Egyptian Royal Guard in 1923. In 1927, Naguib became the first Egyptian military officer to obtain a law license. In 1929, he earned a postgraduate degree in political economy, and then another postgraduate degree in civil law in 1931.

== Military career ==
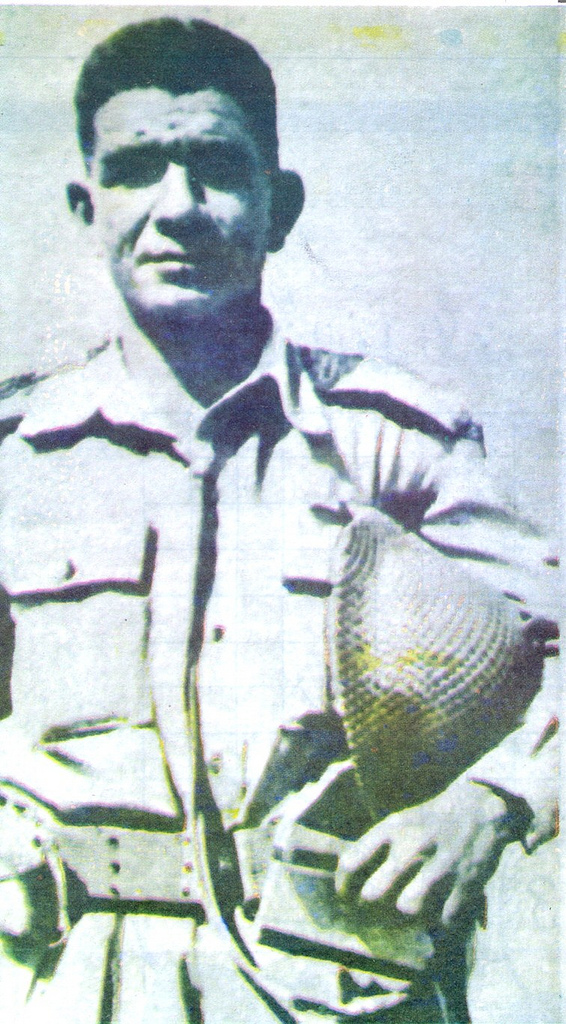
Naguib during the 1948 war

In December 1931, Naguib was promoted to the rank of captain. He moved to the border patrol in Arish in 1934. He was part of the military committee that carried out the terms of the Anglo-Egyptian Treaty of 1936. In Khartoum, he founded a newspaper for the Egyptian Armed Forces in 1937, and he was promoted to the rank of major on 6 May 1938.

Naguib tendered his resignation in protest following the 1942 Abdeen Palace incident. Naguib wrote in his autobiography that he had resigned because he had broken his oath of allegiance to the King by failing to prevent the British siege of the palace, but noted that Abdeen Palace officials thanked him for his actions regardless, and refused to accept his resignation.

Naguib subsequently continued his upward trajectory through the hierarchy of the Egyptian military, achieving the rank of lieutenant colonel and the post of regional governor of the Sinai Peninsula in 1944. He took on leadership of the mechanized infantry of the Sinai in 1947 and was promoted to brigadier general in 1948.

Naguib performed outstandingly during the 1948 Arab–Israeli War, where he was wounded seven times. For his service, he was awarded the first military star of Fuad as well as the title of Bey. He was also subsequently appointed to the directorship of the Egyptian Military Academy, where he would ultimately encounter the members of the Free Officers movement.

== Free Officers Movement ==
Mohamed Naguib was first introduced to the Free Officers Movement by Abdel Hakim Amer during his tenure as the director of the Royal Military Academy in Cairo. The Free Officers were a group of nationalist army officer veterans of the unsuccessful nationalist uprisings of 1935–36 and 1945–46 as well as the 1948 Arab-Israeli War, fiercely opposed to the continuing presence of British military personnel in Egypt and the Sudan since 1882 and the attendant political role that the United Kingdom had in Egyptian affairs. Additionally, they viewed the Egyptian and Sudanese monarchy as weak, corrupt, and incapable of protecting Egyptian and Sudanese national interests, particularly against the United Kingdom, and the State of Israel. In particular, they held King Farouk responsible for the poor conduct of the war in Palestine, in which 78% of the former Mandate for Palestine was lost to the newly proclaimed State of Israel, and some three-quarters of Palestine's Muslim and Christian population variously fled into exile.

The movement had been originally led by Gamal Abdel Nasser, and was composed exclusively of servicemen who were all under 35 years of age and from low-income backgrounds. Nasser, who, like Naguib, was a veteran of the 1948 Arab–Israeli War, felt that the movement needed an older officer from a distinguished military background in order to be taken seriously. The highly respected and nationally famous Naguib was the obvious choice, and he was invited to assume leadership of the movement. While this proved successful in strengthening the Free Officers, it would later cause great friction within the movement, and an eventual power struggle between the elder Naguib and the younger Nasser. Historians have noted that whilst Naguib understood his position and duty as being the movement's bona fide leader, the younger Free Officers saw him as a figurehead who would yield to the collective decision-making of the movement, giving Naguib a more limited, symbolic role.

== Revolution of 1952 ==
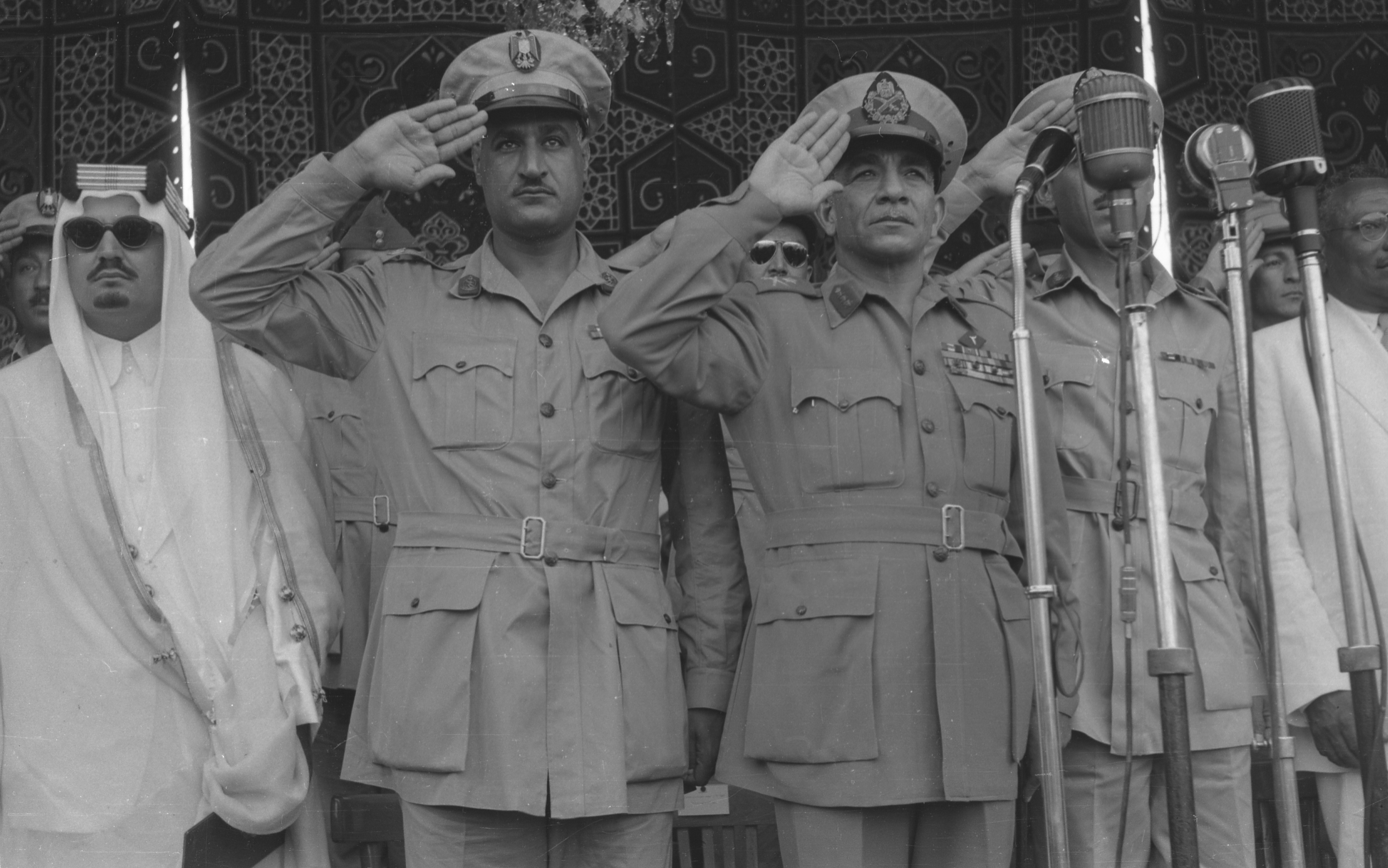
Naguib saluting at the opening of the Suez Canal with Gamal Abdel Nasser

On 23 July 1952 at about 1 am, the Free Officers launched the revolution with a coup d'état to depose King Farouk. Naguib was immediately appointed as Commander in Chief of the Army in order to keep the loyalty of the Armed Forces firmly behind the Revolution. His celebrated status as a hero of the 1948 Arab–Israeli War, along with his jovial personality and elder statesmen demeanor also made him appear as a reassuring figure to the Egyptian public, who had not previously been exposed to Nasser and the other Free Officers.

The Free Officers chose to govern at first via Aly Maher Pasha, a former prime minister who was known for his opposition to the United Kingdom's occupation of Egypt, and its interference in Egyptian affairs. The next evening, Naguib met with British diplomat John Hamilton. During the meeting, Hamilton assured Naguib that the British government supported the abdication of King Farouk, that the Churchill government viewed the coup as an internal Egyptian matter, and that the United Kingdom would intervene only if it felt that British lives and property in Egypt were in danger.

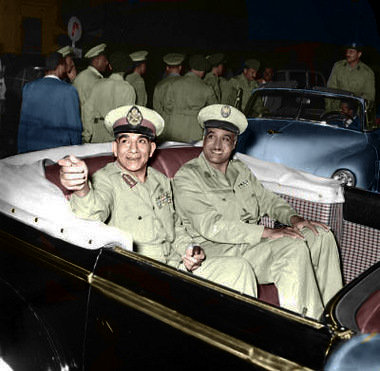
Naguib (left) and Nasser (right) during celebrations for the second anniversary of the revolution, July 1954

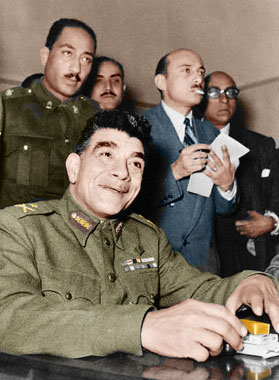
Naguib with Anwar Sadat in the background

The prospect of British intervention on behalf of Farouk was the biggest threat to the Revolution, and Hamilton's message to Naguib gave the Free Officers the reassurance that they needed to follow through with deposing the King. On the morning of 26 July 1952, Maher arrived at the Ras El Tin Palace where Farouk was staying in order to present him with an ultimatum from Naguib: he was to abdicate his throne, and leave Egypt by 6 pm the following day, or the Egyptian troops gathered outside Ras El Tin would storm the palace and arrest him. Farouk agreed to the terms of the ultimatum, and the following day, in the presence of Maher, and the United States Ambassador Jefferson Caffery, boarded the Royal yacht El Mahrousa, and left Egypt. In his memoirs, Naguib described how his journey to the dock to meet the deposed Farouk before the former King departed the country was delayed by throngs of people celebrating the Revolution. Caffery confirmed that Naguib was angry at missing the former King's departure. Upon arrival at the dock, Naguib immediately took sail in a small vessel to meet Farouk on the Mahrousa, and formally bid him farewell.

In September, Naguib was appointed prime minister, and a member of the Royal Regent Council, with Nasser serving as the minister of interior. Farouk's infant son succeeded him as Fuad II, and would be the last King of Egypt. The succession was designed to deny the United Kingdom a pretext for intervention, allowing the revolutionaries to maintain that they were opposed only to the corrupt regime of Farouk, and not to the monarchy itself. However, after consolidating their power, the Free Officers quickly moved to implement their long-held plans for abolishing the monarchy. Ali Maher's government resigned on 7 September 1952, and Naguib was appointed prime minister. On 18 June 1953, almost 11 months after the revolution, the revolutionaries stripped the infant King Fuad II of his title, declared the end of the Kingdom of Egypt and the establishment of the Republic of Egypt.

== Presidency ==
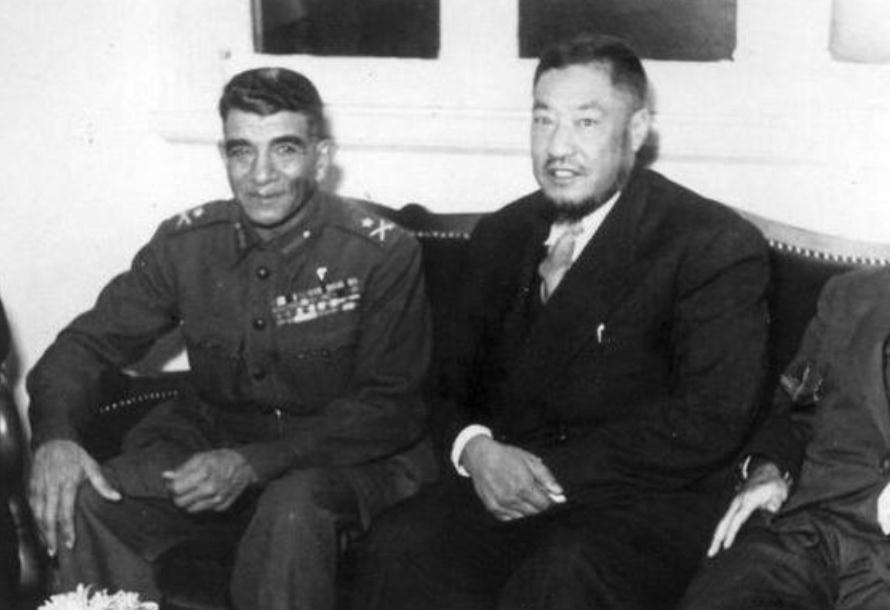
Naguib with Chinese Muslim Kuomintang National Revolutionary Army General Ma Bufang

With the declaration of the Republic, Naguib was sworn in as Egypt's first President. Owing to the non-Egyptian ancestry of Muhammad Ali Pasha (the progenitor of the Muhammad Ali dynasty), and the earlier dynasties that had governed Egypt, Naguib was referenced in Western media as being the first native Egyptian ruler of Egypt since the Roman conquest of Egypt, or even earlier to Pharaoh Nectanebo II, whose reign ended in 342 BC. Naguib himself objected to this characterisation, stating:

"It has been said in the foreign press that I am the first Egyptian to govern Egypt since Cleopatra. Such words flatter but they do not align with our knowledge of our own history. For the sake of glorifying our own Blessed Movement, are we to say that the Fatimids were never Egyptian despite their centuries in Egypt? Do we now deny our kinship with the Ayyubids because of their origin even as we join Saladin's eagle with the Liberation Flag as the symbol of our Revolution? And what of the members of the Mohammed Ali dynasty? Should our grievances against the former King and the flawed and corrupt rulers before him blind us to the nationalism of Abbas Hilmi II, whose devotion to Egypt against the occupiers cost him his throne, or the achievements of Ibrahim Pasha, the very best of the dynasty, who himself declared that the Sun of Egypt and the water of the Nile had made him Egyptian? Are we now to go through the family histories of all Egyptians and invalidate those born to a non-Egyptian parent? If so, I must start with myself. It is fairer and more accurate to say that we are all Egyptians, but I am the first Egyptian to have been raised from the ranks of the people to the highest office to govern Egypt as one of their own. It is an honour and a sacred burden great enough without the embellishments that foreign observers would add to it."

=== Forced resignation ===
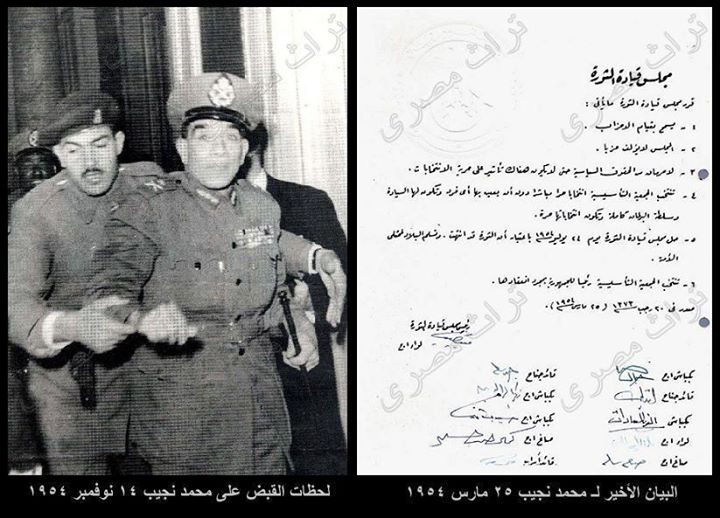
Last declaration by Mohamed Naguib before his arrest, 1954

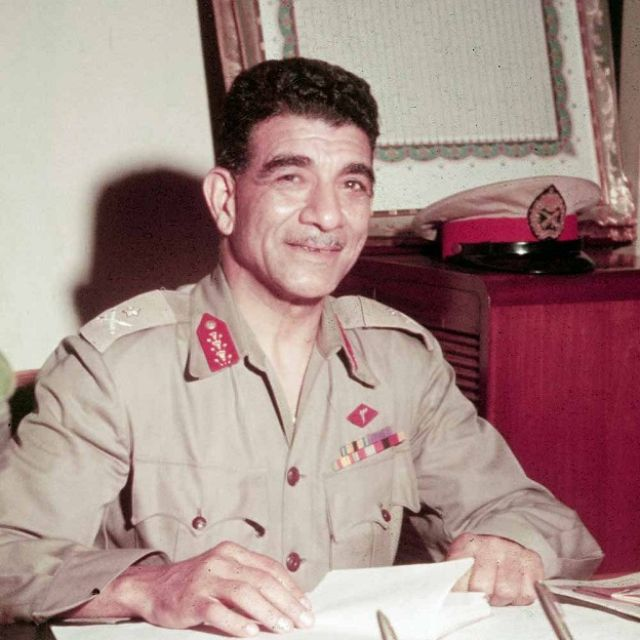
Naguib at his office, 1953

When Naguib began showing signs of independence from Nasser by distancing himself from the RCC's land reform decrees and drawing closer to Egypt's established political forces, namely the Wafd Party and Muslim Brotherhood, Nasser resolved to depose him. In late 1953, Nasser accused Naguib of supporting the recently outlawed Muslim Brotherhood and of harboring dictatorial ambitions. A brief power struggle broke out between Naguib and Nasser for control of the military and of Egypt. Nasser ultimately won the struggle and managed to force Naguib to resign from the presidency of Egypt in November 1954. Nasser then placed Naguib under informal house arrest in a suburban Cairo villa owned by Zeinab Al-Wakil, the wife of former Prime Minister Mostafa El-Nahas. Naguib was released from house arrest in 1971 by President Anwar Sadat.

== Personal life and death ==
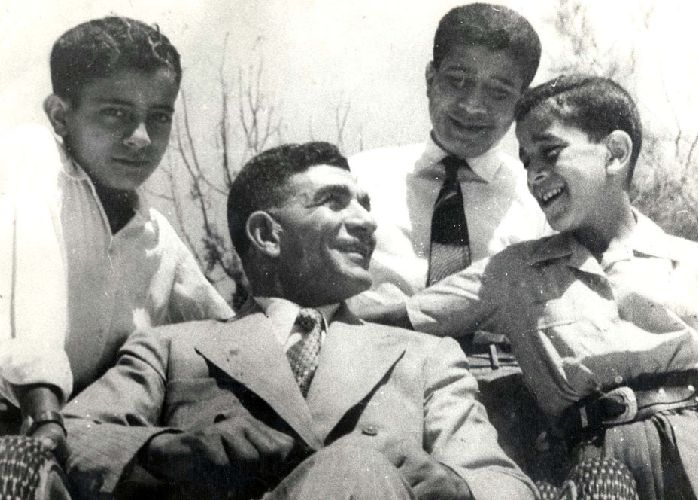
Naguib with his sons

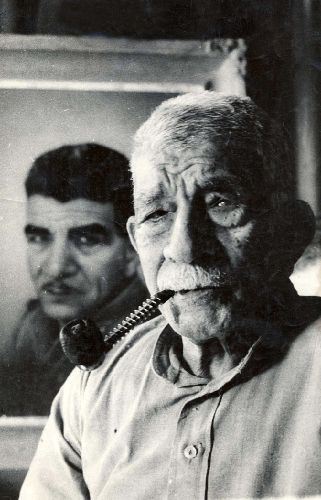
Naguib, in front of his portrait, in the last days of his life

Naguib was married and had four children: three sons and a daughter. His sons were Farouk, Yusuf and Ali. Life magazine reported shortly after the revolution in August 1952 that his eldest son Farouk, then 14 years old, was planning to change his name, likely due to the fact that he shared one with the recently deposed king. His daughter died in 1951.

On 28 August 1984, Naguib died from liver cirrhosis in Cairo, Egypt. He was 83. Naguib had a military funeral that was attended by President Hosni Mubarak. Naguib's coffin, draped in the Egyptian flag, was carried on a gun carriage drawn by six horses, as brass bands played funeral music. Hundreds of mourners, including government officials, foreign dignitaries, and family members, marched behind the carriage.

== Legacy ==
Shortly before his death in 1984, Naguib published his memoirs under the title I Was a President of Egypt. The book was widely circulated and was also translated into English under the title Egypt's Destiny. A station of the Cairo Metro is named in his honor. A major road in the Al Amarat District of Khartoum is also named after him.

In December 2013, Interim Egyptian President Adly Mansour posthumously awarded Naguib the Order of the Nile, the highest honour of the Egyptian state. The award was received by his son, Mohamed Yusuf.

== See also ==
- List of rulers of Egypt
- List of presidents of Egypt
- History of republican Egypt

Political offices
Preceded by Fuad II as King of Egypt and the Sudan	Head of state of Egypt; 1953–1954	Succeeded by Gamal Abdel Nasser
New title Republic proclaimed	President of Egypt; 1953–1954	Succeeded by Gamal Abdel Nasser
Preceded by Ali Maher	Prime Minister of Egypt; 1952–1954	Succeeded by Gamal Abdel Nasser
