= List of newspapers in Egypt =

The number of Arabic newspapers in Egypt was about 200 in 1938. There were also 65 newspapers published in languages other than Arabic, such as Turkish, French and English. By 1951 Arabic language newspapers numbered to about 400, while 150 were published in other languages. By 2011, daily newspaper circulation in Egypt increased to more than 4.3 million copies.

The following is a list of newspapers in Egypt:

== Newspapers in Arabic ==
- 3yonnews
- Afaq Arabia
- Akhbar el-Yom
  - Akhbar El Hawadeth
  - Akhbar El Nogoom
  - Akhbar El Riada
  - Al Akhbar
  - Al Youm El Sabea
- Al Ahali
- Al-Ahram
  - Al Ahram Al Arabiya (in various Arab countries)
  - Al Ahram Al Duwali (international edition in Europe, USA, Canada)
  - Al Ahram Al Masa'y (evening daily)
  - Al-Ahram Hebdo in French
  - Al-Ahram Weekly in English
- Al Ahrar
- Al Alam Al Youm
- Al Arabi
- Al Fajr Al Jadid
- Al-Badeel
- Al Balagh
- Al Borsa
- Al-Dustour
- Al Esbou'
- Al Fagr
- Al Gomhuria
  - Al Ray Lel Shaab
  - Al Kora wal Malaeb
  - Al Messa
  - Aqedaty
  - Egyptian Gazette in English
  - Le Progrès Egyptien in French
  - Shashaty
- Al-Jamahir
- Al Jarida
- Al Karama
- Al Liwa
- Al Misri
- Al-Masry Al-Youm
- Al Maarif
- Al Muayyad
- Al Muqattam
- Al Qahira
- Al Shaab
- Al-Shorouk
- Al Taawin
- Al Tahrir
- Al Wafd
- Al Watany Alyoum
- Al Zamalek
  - AlamelArab الصحف المصرية
- Ash-Shams
- Elaph
- MasrAlarabia مصر العربية
- Nahdet Mısr
- Nogoom Masrya
- Naseej News
- Mada de Masa
- Masrawy
- Rai Al shaab
- Shbab Misr
- Sut El Ummal
- Youm7
- Parvaresh (newspaper)
- Zamalek SC (magazine)
- Sawt al'azhar
- Amwal alghad

== Newspapers in Armenian ==
- Arev
- Housaper
- Tchahagir

== Newspapers in English ==
- Daily News Egypt
- Egypt Independent
- Egyptian Streets
- Egypt Today
- The Egyptian Gazette
- Mada Masr
- Egypt Daily News
- Egypt News
- Egyptian Mail
- The Middle East Observer
- Middle East Times
- Hotels Africa

== Newspapers in French ==
- Al-Ahram Hebdo
- Le Bosphore Égyptien
- Courrier de l'Égypte
- Le Progrès Egyptien

== Newspapers in Ottoman Turkish ==
- Mizan

== Newspapers in Persian ==
- Hekmat
- Parvaresh
- Sorayya

== Status of Egyptian media ==
Egyptian radio and TV channels are controlled by the government. However, in the past few years, several private satellite stations have been established in the country.

Egyptian print media can be divided into the following categories:

- Owned by the Egyptian government or the ruling national democratic party.
- Governmental. These publications are not owned by the Egyptian government, but since the Egyptian president appoints the head of the Shura Council (Senate) who is also, de facto, the head of the Higher Press Council that appoints the chair and board of directors of many publishing houses in Egypt, government influence is very strong.
- Belonging to an Egyptian opposition party
- Independent publications, not linked to government or any opposition party

=== Table of publications ===
	Egyptian government or ruling National Democratic Party	Semi-governmental	Publications belonging to the opposition	Independent
Egyptian dailies		Al-Ahrām; Al-Akhbār	Al-Ahrār (Ahrār Party); Al-Wafd (Wafd Party)	
Egyptian weeklies	Al-Liwā’ al-Islāmī (National Democratic Party - Islamic); Al-Qāhirah (Ministry of Culture)	Al-Ahrām al-^{c}Arabī; ^{c}Aqīdatī (Islamic); Ākhir Sā^{c}ah; Al-Musawar; October; Rose al-Yūsuf; Sabāh al-Khayr	Al-Ahālī (Tajammu' Party); Al-_{c}Arabī (Nasserist Party)	Al-Maydān; Al-Usbū^{c}; Sawt al-Azhar (Al-Azhar – Islamic); Sawt al-Ummah; Watanī (Christian)

(Notes between parentheses indicate political, religious or institutional affiliations.)

The independent electronic magazine Arab West Report provides weekly summary translations and reviews of these media in English in order for a Western public to better understand the wide variety of opinions one finds in Egyptian print media.

== See also ==
- Media of Egypt
- List of magazines in Egypt
- List of radio stations in Egypt
- Television in Egypt
- Telecommunications in Egypt
- List of Arab newspapers
