= Languages of Egypt =

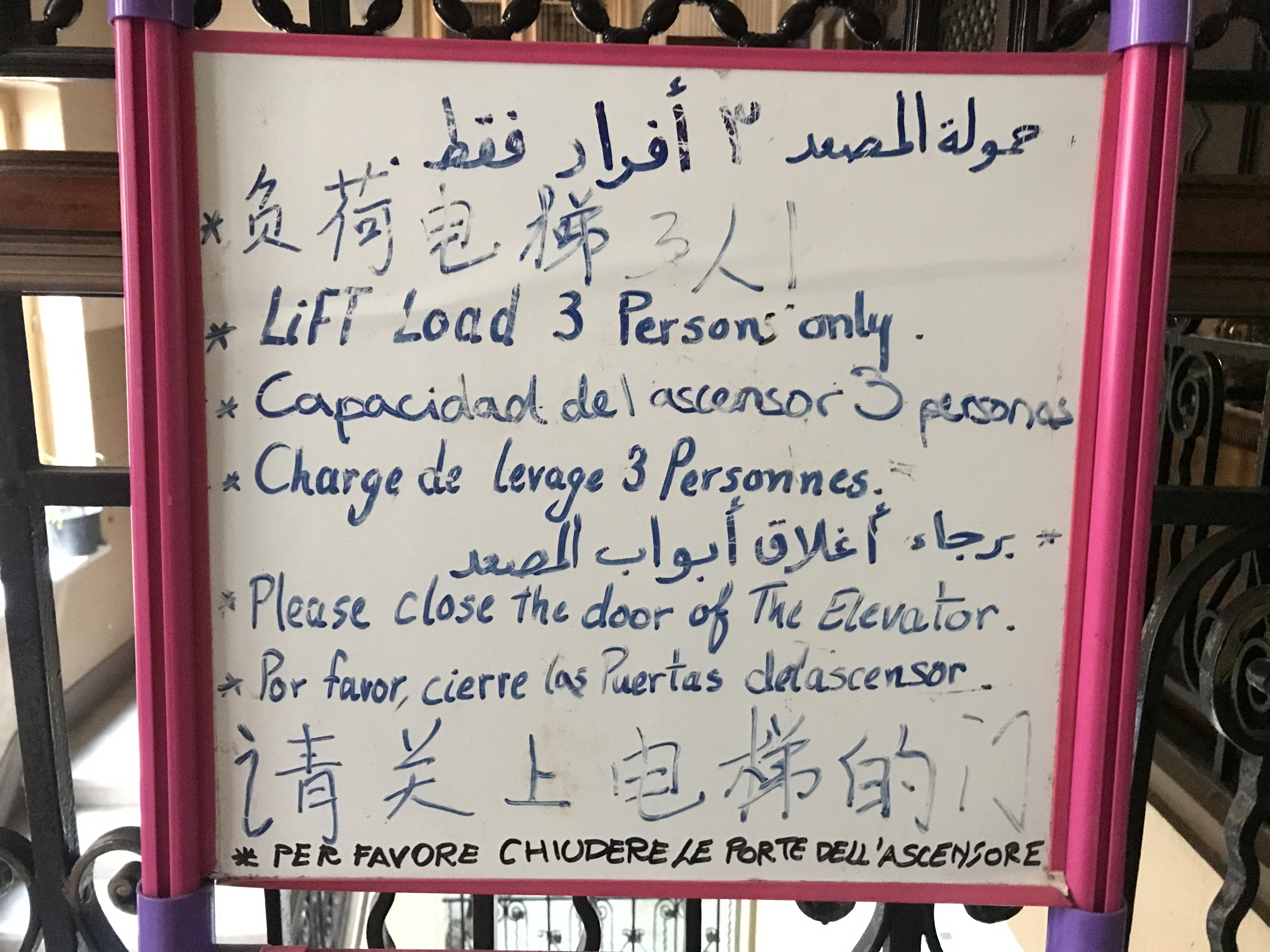
- Multilingual sign at an Egyptian hotel; Egypt attracts tourists from all over the world.
- Official: Literary Arabic
- Vernacular: Egyptian Arabic (66.7%) (de facto lingua franca)
- Minority: Sa'idi Arabic (24%); Sudanese Arabic (3.5%); Levantine Arabic (1.8%); Eastern Egyptian Bedawi Arabic (1.1%); Western Egyptian Bedawi Arabic (0.8%); Nobiin (0.4%); Domari (0.3%); Beja (0.07%); Kenzi (0.03%); Siwi (0.02%); Coptic (mostly liturgical)
- Immigrant: Greek; Armenian; Italian; Russian
- Foreign: English (39.98%); French (3.02%)
- Signed: Egyptian Sign Language
- Keyboard layout: bilingual US QWERTY with Arabic keyboard
- Historical language(s): Ancient Egyptian

Literary Arabic is the official language and the most widely written. Egyptians speak a continuum of dialects. The predominant dialect in Egypt is Egyptian Colloquial Arabic or Masri/Masry (مصرى Egyptian), which is the vernacular language. The Coptic language is used liturgically by Copts as it is the liturgical language of Coptic Christianity.

== Official language ==
Literary Arabic is the official language of Egypt.

== Main spoken language ==
Egyptian Arabic is the commonly spoken language, based on the dialect of Cairo, and is occasionally written in Arabic script, or in Arabic chat alphabet mostly on new communication services.

Of the many varieties of Arabic, Egyptian Arabic is the most widely understood first dialect in the Middle East–North Africa, probably due to the influence of Egyptian cinema and music industry throughout the Arabic-speaking world.

== Minority languages ==
In southern Egypt, Saidi Arabic is the main spoken language for most people.

In the far-Southern Upper Nile Valley, around Kom Ombo and Aswan, there are about 300,000 speakers of Nubian languages, mainly Nobiin, but also Kenuzi.

About 30,000 Egyptian Berbers living in the Siwa oasis and its surroundings speak Siwi language, which is a variety of the Berber language of North Africa. Siwi Berber is mutually intelligible with neighbouring Libyan Berber dialects. Western Egyptian Bedawi is spoken west of the Delta to the borders with Libya, is generally considered a sub dialect of Libyan Arabic. Beja is spoken in the Eastern desert and along the southern Red Sea coast, including the disputed Halaib Triangle.

== Sign languages ==
The only sign language known to be used in Egypt is Egyptian Sign Language. It is known to be used in Alexandria and Cairo, and possibly other regions. Regional variation is reported anecdotally but not documented.

== Foreign languages ==
=== English ===
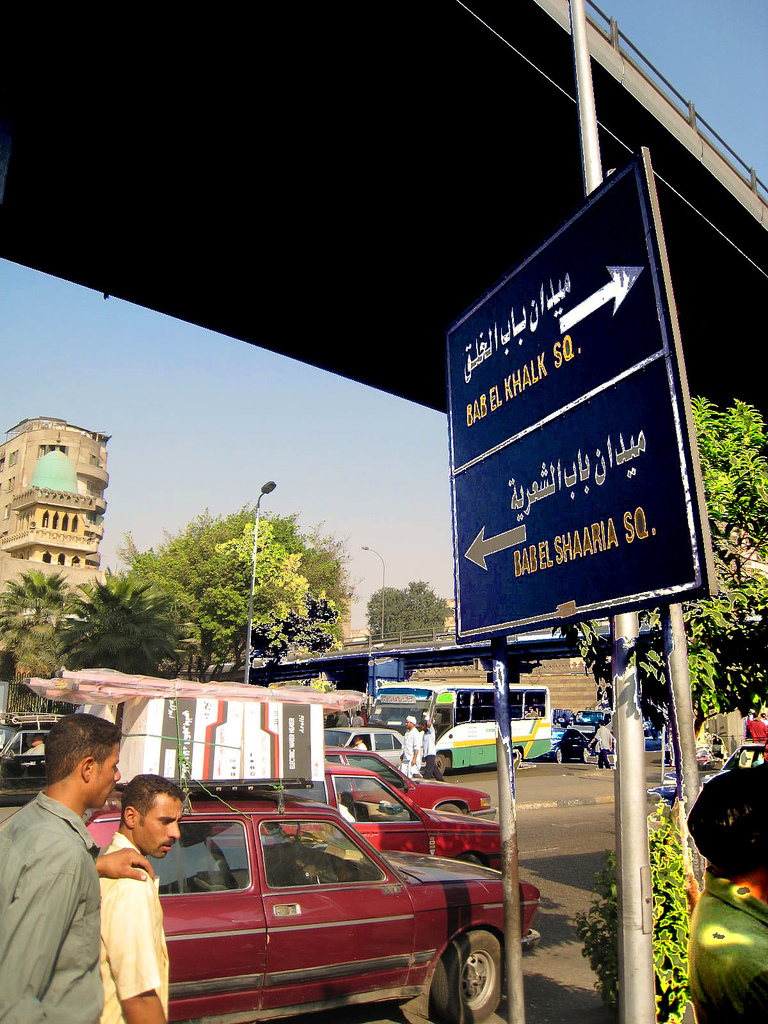
Bilingual Arabic–English sign in Cairo.

Most educated people in Egypt study English at school. There are also many English language universities in Egypt including the BUE (British University in Egypt), the FUE (Future University in Egypt), Nile University and the AUC (American University in Cairo). English is the most widely used language in tourism. The majority of the road signs in Egypt are written both in Arabic and English. In addition, many English words have started being used by Egyptians in their daily life. English has a crucial position in Egypt: banknotes and coins, as well as stamps, are bilingual in English and Arabic. There is also an important press in the English language in the country, comprising several weeklies and a daily newspaper, the Daily News Egypt.

There is generally no preference towards British or American English; however, the younger generations increasingly prefer the American variant, mostly because of their exposure to American media.

=== French ===
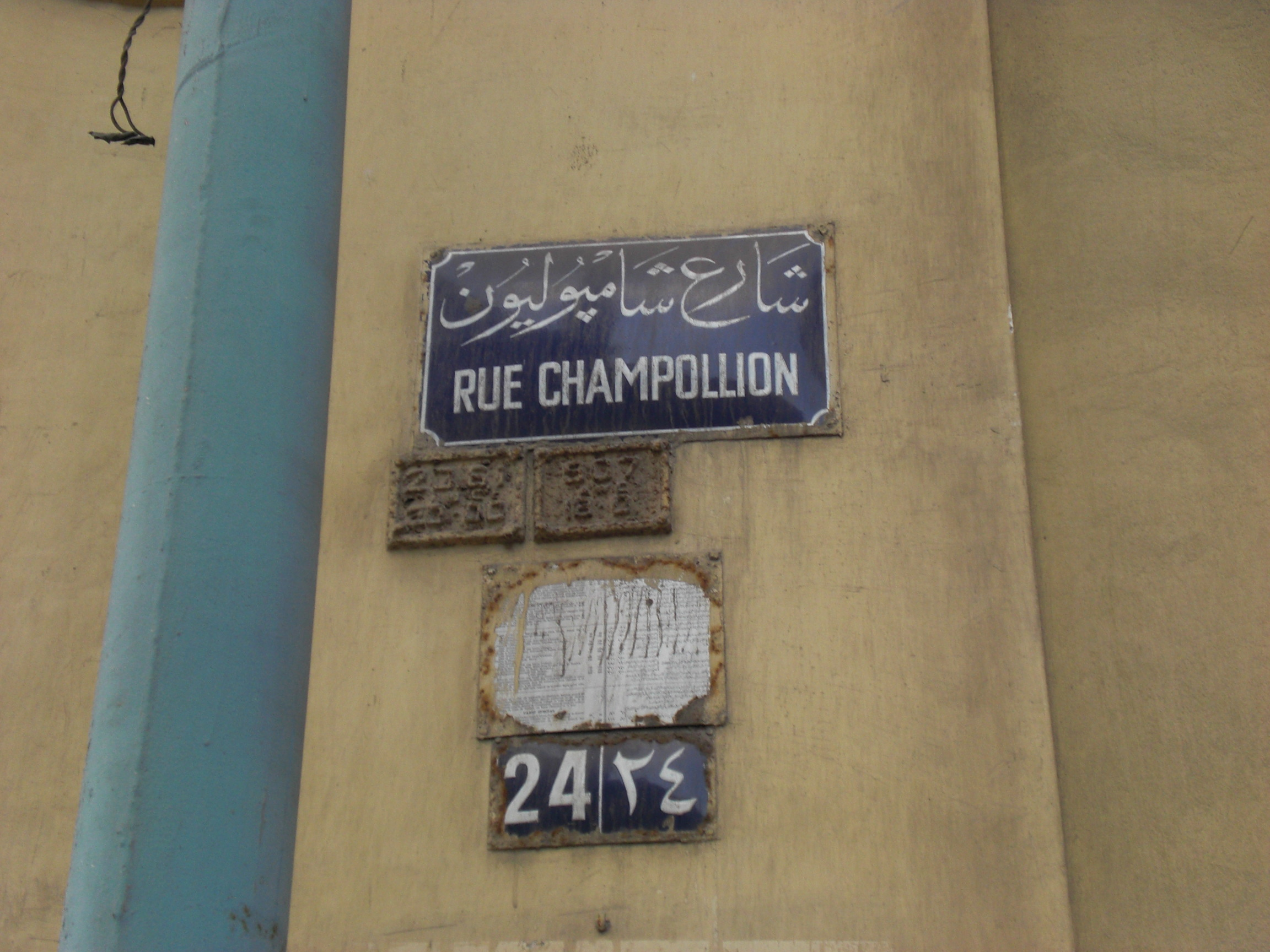
Bilingual Arabic–French street sign in Alexandria.

In 2009–2010, about six million people studied French in Egypt, and this number increased to eight million in 2013. As of 2014, most people in Egypt using French have studied it as a foreign language in school.

The first French-medium schools in Egypt were established in 1836. By the end of the nineteenth century, it had become the dominant foreign language in Egypt and the lingua franca of foreigners; this was especially the case in Cairo.

French became the primary foreign language in media during the rule of Ibrahim Pasha. During the period of the British influence, French was actually the medium of communication among foreigners and between foreigners and Egyptians; the mixed French-Egyptian civil courts operated in French, and government notices from the Egyptian sultan, taxi stand information, timetables of trains, and other legal documents were issued in French. In addition, the usage of French in the media was at the greatest extent in this period. This was partly because some Egyptians had French education and partly because of cultural influence from France. Despite efforts from British legal personnel, English was never adopted as a language of the Egyptian civil courts during the period of British influence.

Owing to social and political reasons, the role of French in Egypt began to decline in the 1920s. Two French-language newspapers are still published in Egypt: Al-Ahram Hebdo and Le Progrès Egyptien.

=== Italian ===
The primary foreign language during the reign of Muhammad Ali (reigned 1805-1848) was Italian. There was an Italian newspaper established in the city of Alexandria in 1858 and 1859, known as Il progresso.

=== Other foreign languages ===
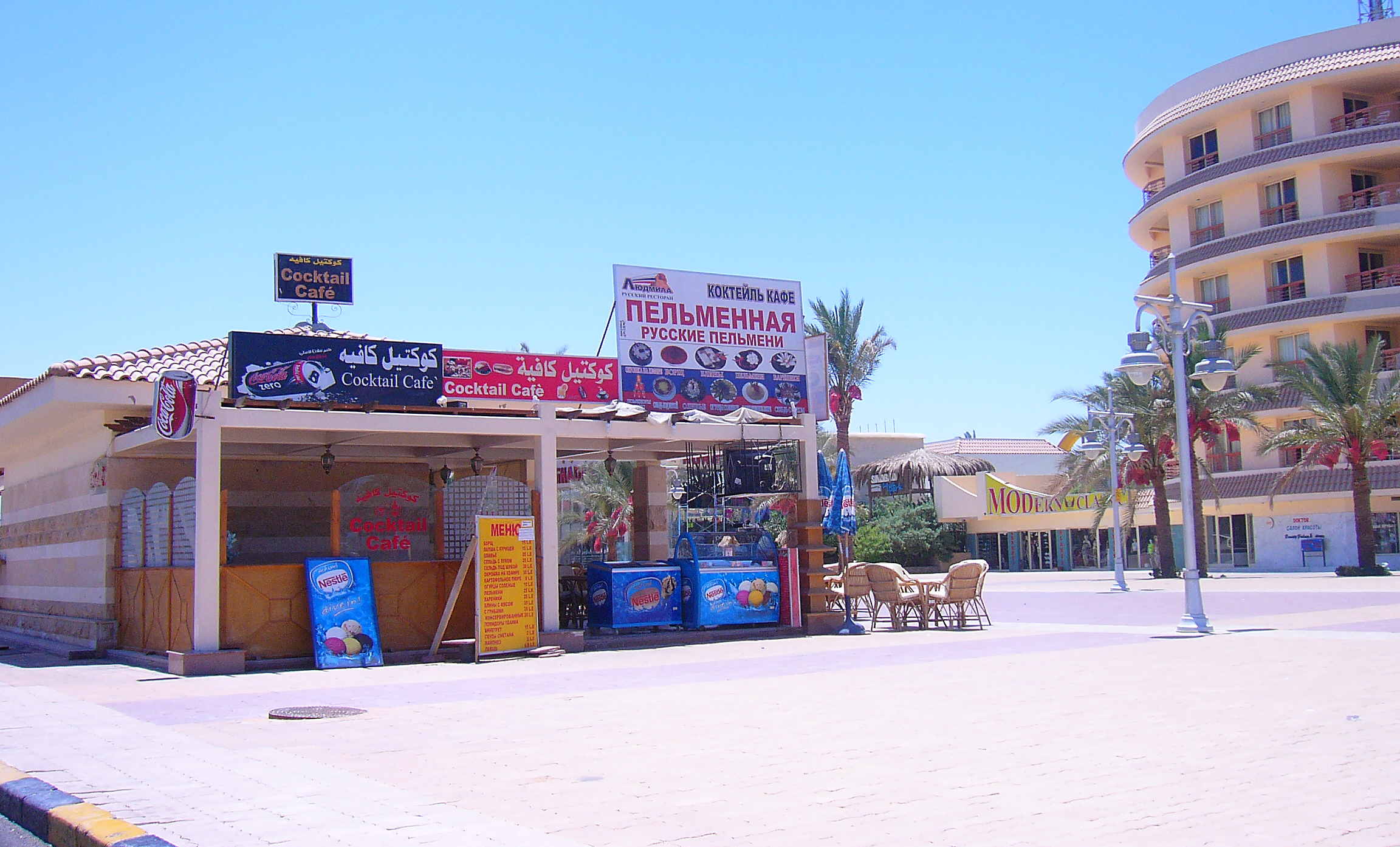
A market in Hurghada with a Russian language banner (on the right).

German and Russian are also used in tourism.

== Historical languages ==
Other Egyptian languages (also known as Copto-Egyptian) consist of ancient Egyptian and Coptic, and form a separate branch among the family of Afro-Asiatic languages. The Egyptian language is among the first written languages, and is known from hieroglyphic inscriptions preserved on monuments and sheets of papyrus. The Coptic language, the only extant descendant of Egyptian, is today the liturgical language of the Coptic Orthodox Church.

The "Koiné" dialect of the Greek language was important in Hellenistic Alexandria, and was used in the philosophy and science of that culture, and was also studied by later Arabic scholars.
