= The Execution of a Pharaoh =

2008 Iranian documentary about Anwar Sadat's assassination

- Persian: اعدام فرعون
- Directed by: Mohsen Yazdi
- Produced by: Committee to Honor the Martyrs of the International Islamic Movement
- Release date: 2008
- Running time: 62 minutes
- Country: Iran
- Languages: Arabic Original, Persian subtitles

The Execution of a Pharaoh, also translated as The Assassination of the Pharaoh (Persian: اعدام فرعون), is a 2008 Iranian documentary film produced by the Foundation for Honoring the Martyrs of the International Islamic Revolution Movement of Iran.

The film addresses the assassination of former Egyptian President Anwar Sadat, condemning Sadat's policies and supporting the assassination. The film was widely criticized by Egyptian media, newspapers, filmmakers, and artists. The movie is sixty-two minutes and is in Arabic with Persian subtitles.

Following its release, allegations were made that the documentary had plagiarized content from a documentary produced and broadcast by Al Jazeera as part of a series of documentaries for a program called Political Crime. Al Jazeera opened an investigation into the film, calling it a "media crime, theft and distortion" of the program it produced.

== Film description ==
=== Content ===
The film is based on a compilation of archival footage, including that of the Assassination of Anwar Sadat during a military parade, and the signing of the Camp David Accords in the United States between Egyptian President Anwar Sadat and Israeli President Menachem Begin in the presence of President Jimmy Carter, and some of the late president's speeches. The film also includes television interviews, some of which were specially produced for the movie, and some are archival interviews of people described as political and security experts. The two main axes that aroused the ire of some circles in Egypt, the first of which was that the film accuses the Egyptian President of treason for signing the Camp David Accords, as the movie states, the reason for Sadat's assassination was "the traitorous president signing the despicable Camp David Accords". The second axis glorifies his killers Khalid Al-Islambuli, Atta Tayel and Abdel Hamid Abdel Salam and calls them martyrs. The film was broadcast on the sidelines of the ceremony of the Foundation for Honoring the Martyrs of the Islamic Revolution in Iran. The movie is named after the phrase Islambuli used when he went to kill Sadat: "Death to Pharaoh."

=== People cited in the movie ===
- Jehan Sadat (wife of Anwar Sadat)
- Mustafa Khalil (Former Prime Minister of Egypt)
- Nabawi Ismail (former Minister of Interior of Egypt)
- Abou Elela Mady (Former leader of Al-Jama'a al-Islamiyya in Egypt)
- Fouad Allam (former head of Egypt's State Security Investigations Service)

Farouz Rajaee Far, head of the Foundation for Honoring the Martyrs of the Islamic Revolution, said, "The foundation has produced many films related to the heroes who carried out martyrdom operations in Palestine, noting that the film was based on documents taken from Al-Jazeera satellite channel and American sources."

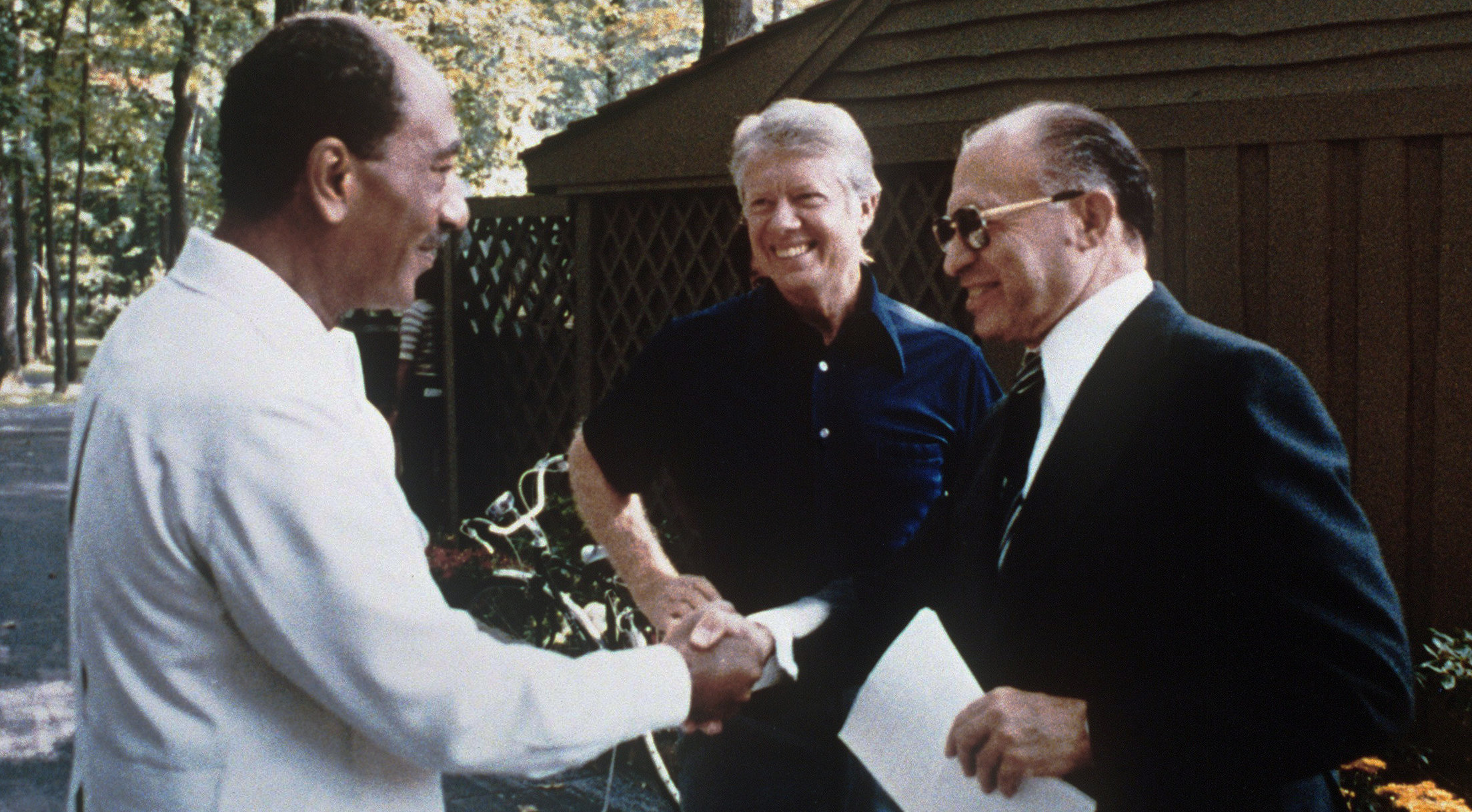
President Anwar Sadat and Menachem Begin shake hands in the presence of US President Jimmy Carter.

== Plagiarism allegations ==
Following accusations of plagiarism, a media official at the Iranian Interests Section in Cairo confirmed that the film had taken content from a documentary belonging to the Al Jazeera channel. The documentary in question was first broadcast on Al Jazeera in 2006, on the anniversary of Sadat's assassination.

Al Jazeera launched an investigation into the leak of clips from its documentary to the Iranian Committee. The program in question is a two-hour "Political Crime" program featuring the opinions of analysts and witnesses to the era and the assassination. Al Jazeera considered what the Iranian Committee did a "media crime" and a blatant violation of intellectual property rights. Tamer Mohsen, director of the "Political Crime" program, said that when he watched "The Execution of the Pharaoh," it became clear to him that the vast majority of the footage was taken from his program, but did not appear with the content that he presented. He also pointed out that the film includes footage that wasn't in his documentary, and that some shots from his program were deleted. The deleted segments included footage showing the remorse of members of the Al-Jama'a al-Islamiyya that carried out Sadat's assassination. Mohsen also said he did not know that his work was used in The Execution of the Pharaoh until some of his friends saw the film on YouTube.

On 6 August 2008, Al Jazeera issued a statement stating that The Execution of the Pharaoh had no connection to the channel, and was a misrepresentation and distortion of the Sadat assassination program that the channel had first broadcast in 2006. According to the channel's statement, the 2006 program was well received by the public for its high professionalism and did not raise any objections. The channel also stated that the film was cut in half and re-edited, and featured politically propagandized writing that was not present in The Assassination of Sadat.

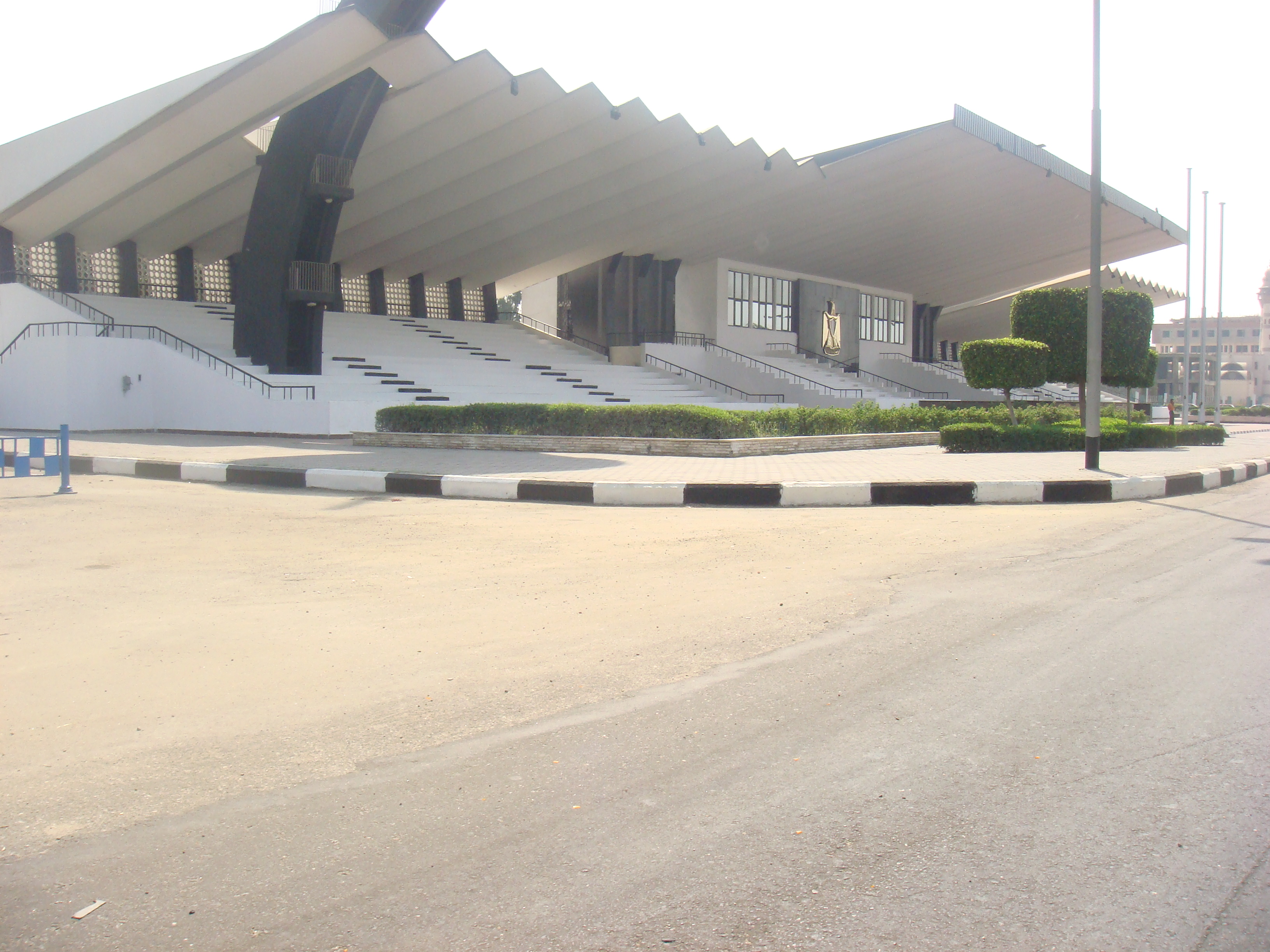
The 6 October platform where former Egyptian President Anwar Sadat was killed.

== Egyptian reaction ==
=== Official reaction ===
The Egyptian Foreign Ministry said that Assistant Foreign Minister for Asian Affairs Ambassador Tamer Khalil met with the director of the Iranian Interests Section in Cairo. He emphasized to the Iranian diplomat that: "This film harms relations between the two countries, and that such matters are not right and do not indicate in any way that Iran understands Egyptian sensitivities, and therefore this film affects any positive development of Egyptian-Iranian relations".

Egyptian Foreign Minister Ahmed Aboul Gheit said: "We condemn this movie in the strongest possible terms." He also added "Regarding the movie, it is sad that an Islamic society would allow this great Egyptian national leader to be attacked," he said.

In a session of the Parliament of Egypt on 10 July 2008, it was emphasized that: "The production of a film that insults Egypt and its leaders is an irresponsible act that is completely contrary to the simplest diplomatic rules, good neighborliness, and international custom." Egyptian Shura Council chairman Safwat al-Sharif said that "stopping the broadcast of the film would prove the goodwill of the Iranian side in its attempts to restore normal relations with Egypt".

In another session of the Parliament of Egypt on 13 July 2008, the assembly called for banning the broadcasting of the film in all official and unofficial media outlets because it offends Anwar Sadat's legacy. The statement from the assembly said: "Iran's statements that the film does not represent the official stand cannot be easily accepted because there is a constant confusion between official and unofficial positions in Tehran and Iran has nothing to be proud of in the field of freedom of expression."

The Egyptian Football Association decided to cancel a friendly match scheduled between the Egyptian and Iranian national teams on 20 August 2008. Association president Samir Zaher said he had been in contact with the Egyptian Foreign Ministry for ten days to discuss the matter, until it was decided to cancel the match.

Egypt decided to downgrade its representation at the Non-Aligned Movement's foreign ministers' meeting held in Tehran from 26 to 30 July 2008. Egypt was represented at the meeting by Ambassador Naela Gabr, Assistant Minister of Foreign Affairs for International Multilateral Political Relations. This was interpreted as a continuation of the Egyptian reaction against the film.

=== Al-Azhar ===
The Islamic Research Academy of Al-Azhar held an emergency meeting to discuss the film. It issued a statement on 14 July 2008, describing those who produced the film as: "A misguided and misguiding group from Iran," and describing the film itself as "an ugly movie that severely insults the martyred President Muhammad Anwar Sadat and glorifies those who assassinated him through treachery, betrayal, immorality and infidelity". The Sheikh of Al-Azhar, Muhammad Sayyid Tantawy, later declined an invitation by Iranian diplomats to visit Iran to reduce tensions between the two countries. The Sheikh of Al-Azhar called on the Iranian authorities to take practical steps to prove the validity of their official position, including changing the name of the street that bears Islambuli's name in Tehran. He also said: "Although we seek rapprochement between Islamic sects, especially Sunnis and Shiites, Tehran seeks to undermine this rapprochement and create more hatred and rancor through its production of this movie, 'The Execution of the Pharaoh' which was produced by a 'misguided Iranian' faction."

Iran had requested the establishment of a branch of Al-Azhar in Tehran, but the Sheikh of Al-Azhar rejected this request. He stated: "We were on good terms with Tehran, but when Iranian entities broadcast the movie 'The Execution of Pharaoh,' we took an irreversible position that if this movie is not burned, we will part ways with them until death".

The Al-Azhar Scholars Front criticized statements by Al-Azhar's Islamic Research Council to "burn The Execution of the Pharaoh". It opposed what it described as "the use of religious institutions to serve political whims."

=== Lawsuits ===
Anwar Sadat's daughter, Ruqaiya Sadat, filed a lawsuit with the Administrative Court demanding a decree banning the broadcast of the movie in Egypt and in all media outlets of all kinds. She also filed an insult and defamation lawsuit before the Abdeen Misdemeanor Court against the film director and Iranian President Ahmadinejad, and she issued a warning to Iranian President Ahmadinejad demanding that he stop showing the film. According to sources, She demanded half a billion dollars in compensation. The Abdeen Misdemeanor Court was scheduled to hear the case filed by Ruqaya Sadat on 30 October 2008. The defamation case postponed to 30 November 2008, for lack of digital jurisdiction. At the 30 Nov hearing, the case was dismissed on both civil and criminal grounds, with the ruling stating that legal action should have been taken through the public prosecutor since the defamation incident took place outside the country. Ruqaiya Sadat's lawyer said that the verdict was not correct from the point of view of the law, as the movie was shown on Internet sites and many Egyptians watched it, thus fulfilling the crime of insult and defamation on Egyptian territory, therefore the Egyptian courts have jurisdiction, he said, adding that an appeal memorandum will be submitted to the Public Prosecution Court and the civil lawsuit filed by Ruqaiya Sadat seeking compensation will be appealed. She appealed the defamation case on 21 January 2009, before the Abdeen Appeals Misdemeanor Court. The hearing on the motion to ban the film has been postponed until 25 November. Then it was postponed again to 2 December 2008; To review and submit notes, according to what the sources said. On 2 December, the Administrative Court postponed the hearing of the case to 16 December, for review and the submission of documents. Jehan Sadat expressed her displeasure with Ruqaiya Sadat's move, saying that no one should trade on Sadat's name. But she said about the Iranian film that she rises above all such "absurdities and hatreds."

=== Cinema and television ===
Segments of the Iranian film were aired on the Al-Hiwar satellite channel as part of a talk show. Participants described the film as "an Egyptian film translated into Persian," saying it was simply a rehash of footage compiled from episodes about the circumstances of Sadat's assassination which had aired on Arab satellite channels in previous years.

Mohamed Hassan Al-Alfi, editor-in-chief of Al-Watani Al-Youm newspaper, which is close to Egypt's ruling National Party, announced his intention to produce a movie titled Khomeini the Blood Imam, portraying the story of Khomeini's political rise. Masrawy reported that EGP 20 million was allocated for the production of the movie and that it would be directed by Mohammed Fadel.

Mamdouh al-Leithy, the head of the Egyptian Cinematographers Syndicate, stated that he was also in the process of producing a feature film about the life of Ayatollah Khomeini, but said his production was separate from Khomeini the Blood Imam. Al-Leithy said he would present: "A movie with a great deal of objectivity, not as they did in 'The Execution of a Pharaoh,' which portrays Sadat as a traitor."

A lawsuit was filed against Egyptian Minister of Manpower Aisha Abdel Hadi for allowing four Iranian makeup artists to participate in a series about former Egyptian President Gamal Abdel Nasser. The suit was filed by Egyptian cosmetics expert Mohamed Ashoub, who said that "this measure may affect Egypt's national security" because "these people are able to change anyone's features." Ruqaiya Sadat commented on this, saying that four Iranians who participated in insulting a symbol of Egypt have no right to participate in a major drama about Abdel Nasser, despite the presence of capable national talents.

=== Al-Alam News Network ===
On 24 July 2008, Egyptian security authorities raided the office of the Iranian Arabic-language Al-Alam News Network in Cairo because it did not have the required licenses, according to Egyptian security sources. They confiscated some equipment and investigated the channel's employees. Ahmed Al-Siyoufi, director of the channel's office in Cairo, denied the existence of any relationship between Al-Alam News Network and The Execution of a Pharaoh. The director of the Iranian channel's office also denied the closure of the office, indicating that negotiations with the Egyptian government are still ongoing to prevent the closure of the channel's office.

== Iran's position ==
An official at the media department of the Iranian Interests Section in Cairo said that the film "does not reflect the official position of the Islamic Republic of Iran. These are the actions of people acting on their own, and we regret what has been reported in this regard." According to an Iranian Foreign Ministry official, the film does not reflect the views of the Iranian government, pointing out that the film was produced by a non-governmental organization. Mohammad Hussein Saffar, Minister of Media and Islamic Guidance, confirmed the same.

On 5 August 2008, Karim Azizi, media advisor at the Iranian Interests Section in Cairo, stated that the Iranian Ministry of Culture had begun investigations into The Execution of a Pharaoh and found that the film was originally taken from a documentary produced by Qatar's Al-Jazeera. Azizi added that the Iranian Foundation for Honoring the Martyrs of the Islamic Revolution exploited the documentary, translated it into Persian and distributed it on CDs, replacing the Al-Jazeera logo with the foundation's logo. The Iranian official also said that investigations conducted by the Iranian ministry reached the truth of the film after the confession of members of the "Honoring the Martyrs of Islam" group. Karim Azizi also said that the film is unofficial and was not been granted distribution or copying permits by the Iranian Ministry of Culture, and was therefore illegitimate and illegal.

Karim Azizi told Al-Masry Al-Youm that he believed the issue raised by the film was over, since the documentary had not an Iranian production, saying that the Foundation of Martyrs of Islam had simply translated the movie into Persian and released it under a different name. He also said that "the Egyptian media stopped raising the issue after many pens criticized and insulted Iran even though they had not seen the movie."

Later, Iranian authorities shut down the website of the Foundation to Honor the Martyrs of the International Islamic Movement. Media outlets reported that the closure came as a result of the tension in Egyptian-Iranian relations caused by the film produced by this organization.

Pro-film demonstrations took place in front of the Egyptian diplomatic mission in the Iranian capital Tehran.

On 24 September 2008, Egyptian Assistant Foreign Minister Mohamed Haridi met with Hassan Rajabi, the head of the Iranian Interests Section in Cairo. At this meeting, the Iranian official announced that Tehran had officially banned the circulation of the movie "The Execution of the Pharaoh."

== In the press ==
Egyptian newspapers and media who covered the film were largely hostile to the program and objected to its content. However, some Egyptian writers also criticized the Egyptian government for not taking a similar stance with other films that offend the state and the people.

- In Al Gomhuria, editor-in-chief Mohamed Ali Ibrahim wrote:

"I was amazed at the immoral degradation of Iran and its mullahs. Who are they to call the heroic Egyptian president a traitor, who fought and returned Sinai to the valley and brought Egypt's natural resources of oil, gold, phosphates, and others back to us"

- In Rose al-Youssef, an article titled "New Iranian insolence against Egypt" was published:

"What Iran has done is totally unacceptable and proves once again the nature of Iran's intentions towards Egypt, its people, and its leaders... Iran supports terrorists in various ways. Such repeated insults can only reflect a clear Persian-Shia hatred in Iran. It confirms Egypt's reasons for not re-establishing relations with Iran, as Iran is corrupting Muslims and insulting a departed faithful president, accusing him of treason. It describes an agreement we are still signed to as 'despicable,' and that movie was not an isolated event but part of an ongoing Iranian campaign against Egypt."

- In Al-Masry Al-Youm, Mohamed Abdul Hadi wrote that the Egyptian government did not move with the same intensity in a similar situation. The Israeli film Ruh Shaked, which was shown on Israeli state television, documented and confessed that soldiers from an Israeli military unit of the same name had executed unarmed Egyptian prisoners of war.
- In Iran, Mohammad Hassanzadeh, an international relations expert for Mehr News Agency, wrote an article titled "34 Shots at Egypt's Pharaohs."
  "Although this movie is completely unknown in Iran and no one has seen any footage of it in theaters or on movie screens, it seems that the mouthpieces of the Pharaohs got ahead of the event and started making accusations against Iran as if the Iranian government was the one who prepared the production of this movie."

== Involved parties ==
The timing of the film and the Egyptian response, which has been described as exaggerated, came at a time when relations between Iran and major countries were strained over Iran's nuclear program.

Some observers described the Egyptian government's response to the film as part of a US-Israeli plan to prepare the Egyptian and Arab states to strike Iran. Egyptian parliamentarian Talaat al-Sadat said: "According to my readings, the real Sadat assassination movie is directed by an American, with an Israeli script and dialog, and the executors are brainwashed boys from our own country". He also said in statements to the Qatari newspaper Al Raya: "If the president were alive, he would not pay attention to such a movie because he believes in freedom of opinion, thought and belief."

Some observers also noted that the Foundation to Honor the Martyrs of the International Islamic Movement – established by the fundamentalist movement in Iran – may have aimed to sabotage the efforts of the reformist movement that seeks to re-establish Iranian-Egyptian relations.

Despite the Iranian government's denial of its association with the organization that produced the film, sources have linked the Foundation for Honoring the Martyrs of the Islamic Movement to the IRGC.

== Sequel ==
In 2008, the committee to Honor the Martyrs of the International Islamic Movement announced they were producing a sequel to the documentary, titled 34 Bullets for Pharaoh. It was to include interviews with "experts in Arab-Israeli relations" as well as a discussion of the Camp David Accords.

== See also ==
- Assassination of Anwar Sadat
- Egypt–Iran relations
