= Egypt–Iran relations =

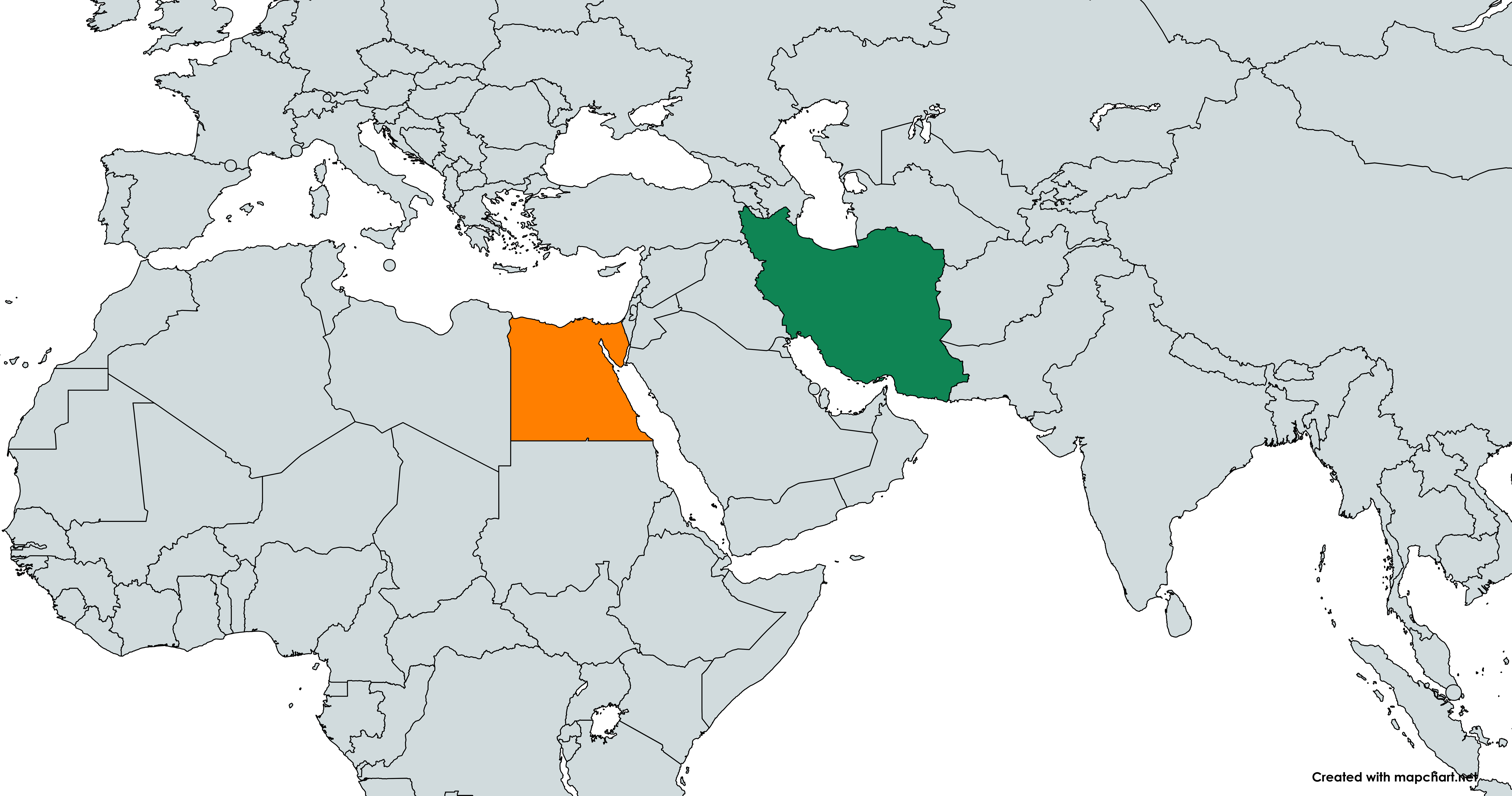

- Iran: Egypt

Diplomatic mission
- Embassy of Egypt, Tehran: Embassy of Iran, Cairo

Following the Egyptian Revolution of 2011, Iran appointed its first ambassador to Egypt in almost 30 years. Despite oft-wavering tensions between the two countries, they share membership in the OIC, the BRICS and the Developing 8.

According to a 2013 BBC World Service poll, 15% of Egyptians view Iran's influence positively, and 48% express a negative view. In a 2012 poll conducted by the Israel Project where 812 Egyptians were questioned about Iran's nuclear programs, 61% of the 812 individuals expressed support for the Iranian nuclear program. The restoring of diplomatic relations were discussed in December 2023, and officially agreed in February 2026.

== History ==
Egypt was ruled by the Achaemenid and Sassanid Persian Empires during ancient times.

Despite sharing the Shia faith, Fatimid Egypt and Buyid Iran had unfriendly relations due to conflicting interests over Syria and Jazira. Both later declined under the pressure of the Seljuk Turks. Following the 1258 Sack of Baghdad, the Sunni Caliphs found asylum in Mamluk Egypt. The Ilkhanate Mongols, based in Iran, fought many wars with the Mamluks even after converting to Islam.

In the 15th century, Mamluk Egypt and Iran under the Aq Qoyunlu Padishah continued to clash in Upper Mesopotamia, culminating in the Battle of Urfa after a similar Iranian advance into Egyptian dependencies in the decade before. However, attitudes changed when Ottoman expansion tipped the balance of power in the Middle East. The Ottomans invaded Egypt once a Safavid-Mamluk alliance seemed imminent.

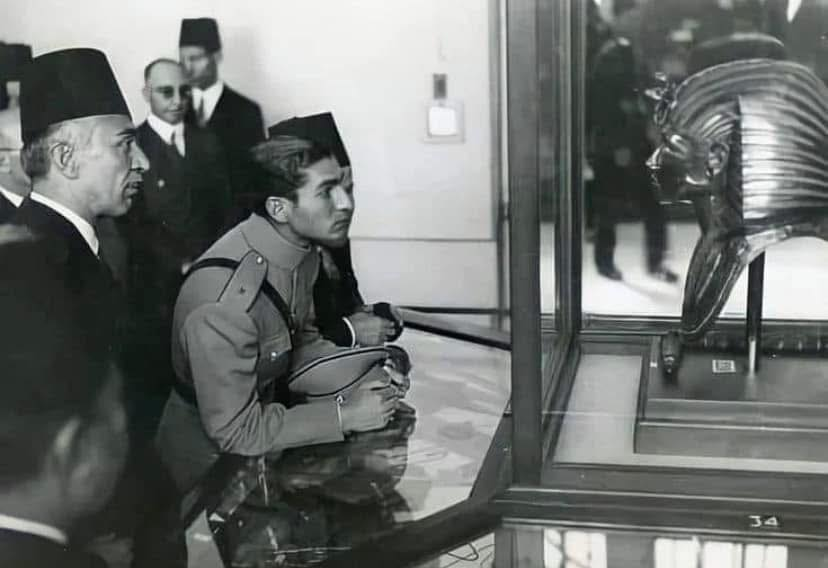
Shah of Iran looking at the Mask of Tutankhamun during a visit to the Egyptian museum in 1939

After the 1922 Declaration of Egyptian Independence, Iran's representation to Egypt was upgraded to a delegation, the only eastern country with a presence in Egypt. Egypt was the first Arab country to have a diplomatic mission in Iran after Reza Khan became Shah of Iran. In 1928, both countries signed a friendship treaty, followed by a trade agreement in 1930. In 1939, diplomatic relations between Egypt and Iran were upgraded to ambassadorial level, and Youssef Zulficar Pasha was appointed as Egypt's first ambassador in Tehran. In the same year, Princess Fawzia of Egypt, the sister of King Farouk I, married Mohammad Reza Pahlavi, the then crown prince (later shah) of Iran.

On November 20th 1951, Iranian prime minister Mossadegh visited Egypt for four days. There he was greeted as a national hero for nationalizing the oil industry in Iran. Mossadegh met both King Farouk and prime minister Mustafa al-Nahhas, where he has awarded an honorary doctorate degree from Fouad University.

The relationship between Iran and Egypt had fallen into open hostility after the Egyptian Revolution of 1952 which brought Gamal Abdel Nasser to power and the CIA-backed coup d'état in Iran in 1953 which saw the return of the Shah Mohammad Reza Pahlavi to power. Egypt felt threatened by the Baghdad Pact, which Iran joined in 1955, whose members were criticized by Nasser as a part of the Anglo-American alliance and against anti-colonial Arab nations. Due to the positive approach of the Shah towards Israel in July 1960 Egypt and Iran expelled each other's ambassadors. The strained relations between Egypt and Iran became progressively worse when Nasser financed Ayatollah Khomeini and other Iranian opposition groups in May 1963 to accelerate the latter's opposition to the Shah. It was also around this time that the Persian Gulf naming dispute arose, as the Egyptian government referred to the body of water as the Arabian Gulf.

=== 1970–1973 ===
After the 1967 war, Iran and Egypt slowly repaired relations. Iran supported an Israeli withdrawal from captured Arab lands. Following Nasser's death in 1970, the presidency of Anwar Sadat turned the relationship around quickly into an open and cordial friendship. Sadat visited Tehran in October 1971, meeting with the Shah. The relationship between Cairo and Tehran became so friendly that the Shah of Iran, Mohammad Reza Pahlavi, called Sadat his "dear brother." After the 1973 war with Israel, Iran assumed a leading role in cleaning up and reactivating the blocked Suez Canal with heavy investment. During the war, Iran allowed Soviet planes to use Iranian airspace to deliver military supplies to Egypt, as well as providing Egypt with loans and grants in exchange for the use of Egypt's Mediterranean ports. Iran also facilitated the withdrawal of Israel from the occupied Sinai Peninsula by promising to substitute with free Iranian oil to the Israelis if they withdrew from the Egyptian oil wells in Western Sinai. Both countries were members of the Safari Club, an alliance of anticommunist intelligence networks. All these added more to the personal friendship between Sadat and the Shah of Iran.

=== Post–1979 and the Iran-Iraq War ===
The 1979 Iranian Revolution significantly deteriorated relations between the two countries, The former Shah sought refuge in Egypt, where he stayed until his death. Sadat's assassin, Khalid Al-Islambuli, had both a street and mural named after him in Iran (however, the honoree was changed to Muhammad al-Durrah, the 12-year-old Palestinian boy shot and killed during the outset of the Second Intifada). In 1987 Egypt recalled its lone diplomat in Tehran and expelled two Iranian diplomats in Cairo over suspicions of supporting extremist groups. Egypt supported Iraq with billions of dollars of war material during the Iran-Iraq war. Egyptian pilots and drafted Egyptian workers served in the Iraqi military. According to reports from al-Ahrar and al-Shaab, around ten thousand Egyptians were held as prisoners of war in Iran, though the Egyptian government only recognized the existence of between 1600 and 3900. Iran later released them as a good-will gesture.

After the war, Iran tried to normalize relations with the Arab world. The Iranian delegation at the 1990 OIC meeting in Cairo announced plans to release all Egyptian POWs captured in the war. In March 1991, the two countries reopened their interests sections at the French and Swiss embassies. However, relations were still wary. Egypt was against Iranian involvement in the military coordination of Gulf countries in 1991. Iran was against the Arab-Israeli talks of the 1990s, such as the 1991 Madrid conference. Egypt was wary of Iranian support for the new Islamist Sudanese regime following the 1989 coup.

In May 1994, Ali Akbar Velayati visited Egypt, the first meeting by an Iranian foreign minister since 1978. After some meetings, they reached an agreement over a debt of $149 million Egypt owed to Iran from the pre-1979 era. Egypt agreed to send equipment and technical support to Iran worth that amount to support the sugar industry in Khuzistan. The Misr-Iran bank resumed operations. At the 1997 OIC meeting in Tehran, the first ever to be held in the Iranian capital, Egyptian foreign minister Amr Moussa met Iranian president Khatami. However, president Hosni Mubarak was still not in favor of complete normalization of relations due to Iranian support for extremist groups. In June 1998 Egypt and Iran signed an economic cooperation protocol, and Egyptian appointed a new ambassador, Refaa al Tahtawi. The first direct contact between the two countries leaders occurred when Mubarak called Khatami in June 2000, congratulating him on Iranian membership to the G-15. The two men met in person in 2003.

In 2007, relations between the two countries thawed in the fields of diplomacy and economic trade, only to retreat during the 2008–2009 Israel–Gaza conflict when Iranian and Egyptian politicians exchanged blames over inaction towards the escalation of the conflict. It was not until the official resignation of President Hosni Mubarak in February 2011 that relations started to improve significantly. In April 2012, Iran appointed an ambassador to Egypt. Soon after Mohamed Morsi visited Iran in August 2012, it was decided to reestablish bilateral diplomatic relations, with rededication of embassy locations. A first ambassador was nominated to represent Egypt in Iran. While overall relations have been steadily improving, continued tensions between Iran, Saudi Arabia and allied Western nations have put this development into question. In March 2013, direct flights between two countries were reinstated. In July 2013, after the uprising and subsequent overthrow that removed Mohamed Morsi and his Muslim Brotherhood-dominated government, the interim Minister of Foreign Affairs, Nabil Fahmy announced that Egypt seeks stable and positive ties with the Islamic Republic of Iran. In 2015, Egyptian President Abdel Fattah El-Sisi stated that Egypt has no relations with Iran on the Egyptian Extra News channel.

=== 2020s ===
In 2023, in the aftermath of the Chinese brokered Saudi-Iran Deal, Egypt and Iran have had numerous rounds of talks in Oman aimed at restoring relations between the two countries. In May 2023, Iran's Supreme Leader Ayatollah Ali Khamenei said in a meeting with Oman's Sultan that Tehran welcomes better diplomatic relations with Cairo.

Hani Suleiman, a political analyst (in a conversation with Al-Masry Al-Youm): The meeting between the presidents of the Islamic Republic of Iran and Egypt (in 2023), on the sidelines of the Riyadh meeting is considered to be very significant because of some issues, because the mentioned meeting is regarded the first meeting between the heads of these 2 countries after a long time away.

During the 2026 Iran war with the United States and Israel, Egypt has played a role in reaching a ceasefire between Iran and the US.

== Bilateral visits ==
Following the Egyptian Revolution of 2011, and the appointment of ambassadors after nearly 30 years, Egyptian President Mohammed Morsi made a historic first visit to Iran since the Iranian Revolution for the Non-Aligned Movement summit on 30 August 2012, where it handed over the rotating presidency to Iran. Iranian president, Mahmoud Ahmadinejad also visited Egypt in February 2013, making him the first Iranian president to travel to Egypt since the Iranian Revolution.

Guest	Host	Place of visit	Date of visit
(Egypt) President Mohamed Morsi	(Iran) President Mahmoud Ahmadinejad	Tehran	August 2012
(Iran) President Mahmoud Ahmadinejad	(Egypt) President Mohamed Morsi	Cairo	6–7 February 2013
(Iran) President Masoud Pezeshkian	(Egypt) President Abdel Fattah el-Sisi	Cairo	18–20 December 2024

== Resident diplomatic missions ==
- Egypt has an embassy in Tehran.
- Iran has an embassy in Cairo.
- Iran has closed embassy in Egypt Cairo

== See also ==
- Hekmat
