= Bahgat Osman =

Egyptian cartoonist and illustrator

- Bahgat Muhammad Osman بهجت محمد عثمان
- Born: June 6, 1931; Cairo, Egypt
- Died: June 3, 2001 (aged 69); Cairo, Egypt
- Education: Cairo College of Fine Arts, Cairo
- Known for: Drawing, Cartoon, Illustration, Writing, Comic, Sculpture
- Notable work: Illustrations for UNICEF's Convention on the Rights of the Child
- Awards: Suzanne Mubarak 2001 Award in Best Children Book Illustrator, 2001 and Suzanne Mubarak 2002 Award in Excellence
- Patrons: Yusuf Raafat

Bahgat Muhammad Osman (1931–2001) (Arabic: بهجت محمد عثمان) was an Egyptian cartoonist and illustrator, most widely known as for his political cartoons and children's book illustrations throughout most of the Arab world.

== Early life ==
Osman was born in the Boulaq district of Cairo in 1931. Ahmad Shukry, his fourth grade art instructor, discovered Osman's talent and was one of his first supporters until he moved to the secondary school where he met his first mentor Yusuf Raafat. He later entered the College of Fine Arts in Cairo where he studied sculpture. Soon after graduation, Osman worked as an art instructor in the district of Al-Mansoura.

== Politics ==
During the 1960s and 1970s, Osman was a political cartoonist. He sought exile in Kuwait from the regime of Anwar Sadat. He returned to Cairo soon after Sadat's assassination in 1981.

== Work ==
While working at the private school of Mansoura, Osman drew caricatures. These caricatures were promptly rejected when Osman offered them first to Dar El-Hilal due to their political content. However, Rose al-Yūsuf published his works in the belief that, in the words of the magazine's editor-in-chief, "if they were refused by Dar El-Hilal, then they must be very good."

In 1957, the newspaper Al Messa hired him full-time for two years. Subsequently, Osman returned to Rose al-Yūsuf to join a team that then contributed in the success of their weekly publication Sabah El-Kheir.

In the early 1980s Bahgat returned from exile to Egypt to work with the opposition newspaper, Al Ahali.

In addition to the publication of daily and weekly caricatures, Osman contributed in publishing over 20 children's books and comics and illustrated UNICEF's Convention on the Rights of the Child, as well as book covers and entire politically opinionated books such as "Bagatos - President of Great Bahgatia", "Hokouma wa Ahali" (Government and People), and "Diwan Bahagigo" in an attempt to criticize the Egyptian status quo.

=== Publications where he worked ===
- Rose al-Yūsuf
- Sabah el Kheir
- Al Ahali
- Al Messa
- Al Mesawer
- Al Kawakib
- Hawaa
- Al Hilal
- Sameer (children's comic)
- Majed (children's comic)
- Ala'ddin (children's comic)
- Al Arabi Al Sagheer (children's comic)

=== Published books ===
- Diktatorya lil Mubtadeen (Dictatorship for beginners)
- Bahgatos Ra'ees Bahgatia Alozma (Bahgatos President of Bahgatia The Greatest)
- Hokuma wa Ahali (Government and People)
- Dehkaat Majnoona Jiddan (Very Crazy Laughs)
- Sadaka Bela Hudood (Friendship without Boundaries)
- Kunto Hemaran (I was a Donkey)

== Political opinion and withdrawal ==
After the Camp David Accords of 1978, Osman stopped drawing adult comics and instead started drawing for children's books and comics. He dedicated much of his work to women. He and his wife Badr Hamada traveled around the Arab world to draw attention to children's rights and education, as well as contributing to children's artistic education in Yemen.

Osman died at home at the age of 69, on June 3, 2001, a few months after his wife.
