= Nogoom Masrya =

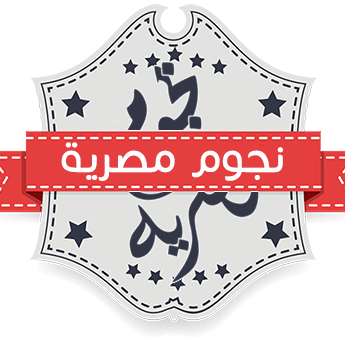
- Website type: Local news website
- Available in: Arabic
- No. of locations: Giza, Egypt
- Owner: Abdelrahman Ellithy
- Website: www.ngmisr.com
- Commercial: "Yes"
- Registration: Optional
- Launched: 2009; 17 years ago
- Current status: Active

Nogoom Masrya (Arabic: نجوم مصرية, IPA: [nudʒuːm masˤriːah], meaning Egyptian Stars) is an Arabic Egyptian independent news web portal founded in September 2009 by Abdelrahman Ellithy. The website is best known for being the first revenue sharing platform in the Arab world

Nogoom Masrya started as an Internet forum in September 2009 with domain name 100fm6.com and focus on celebrity news. Then, it became popular during the Egyptian revolution of 2011 and launched a news portal in 2013 in the Middle East.

Nogoom Masrya launched its news app on App Store for iPhone and iPad users and another app on Google Play for Android users in April 2018.

Nogoom Masrya applied new internet technologies like for example: AMP (Accelerated mobile pages), using HTTPS internet protocol and web push notifications. Nogoom Masrya was one of the early sites that adopted these technologies, and this helped in having fast loading pages for users.

== See also ==
- List of newspapers in Egypt
