= Saad Malki =

Egyptian journalist (1898–1988)

- סעד מלכי
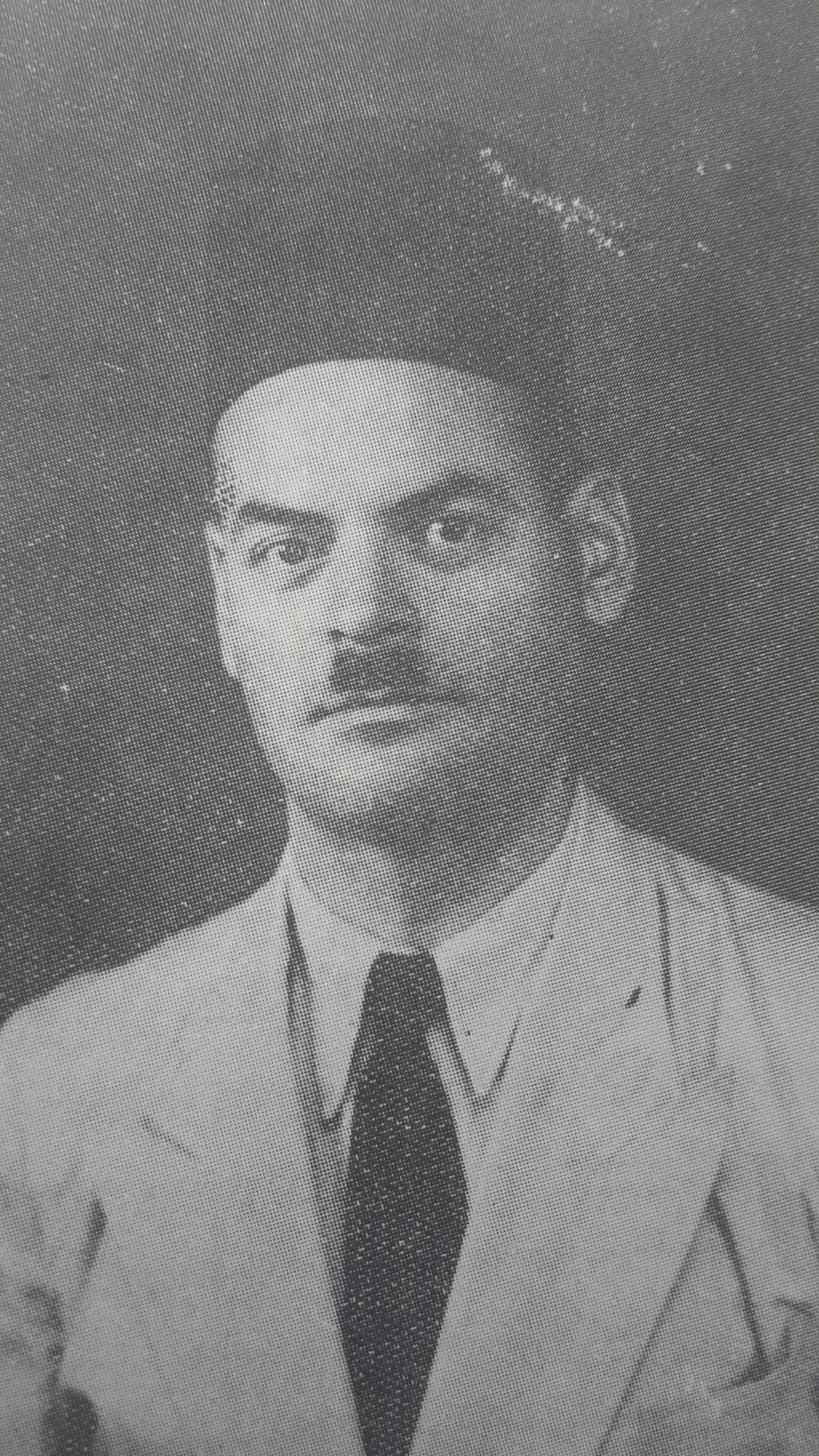
- Born: 30 December 1898; Cairo, Khedivate of Egypt
- Died: 20 May 1988 (aged 79); Israel
- Occupation: Writer
- Organization: Ash-Shams

Saad (Yaakov) Malki (Hebrew: סעד מלכי; 30 December 1898 – 20 May 1988) was an Egyptian Jewish educator, journalist, and Zionist.

== Life and career ==
Saad Malki was born in Cairo. He began his career in journalism after the Balfour Declaration, when he published articles in Al-Ahram. and Al Muqattam in support of Zionism, Jewish-Arab unity, and in defense of the rights of Jews in Egypt. From 1924 he began working as the editor of the Arabic edition of the Egyptian news paper Israël.

In 1934 Malki established the Arabic language Jewish weekly Ash-Shams, which continued operating until it was shut down by Egyptian authorities in 1948. Shortly after, he emigrated to Israel, where he began working as a translator and editor for the government newspaper Reshumot.
