= Zamalek SC (magazine) =

Sport magazine

- Magazine cover celebrates winning the 2014-15 Egyptian Premier League
- Categories: Football and other sports
- Frequency: Weekly
- Founded: 1997; 29 years ago
- Country: Egypt
- Based in: Giza
- Language: Arabic

Zamalek magazine is the official magazine of the Egyptian football club Zamalek.

== Profile ==
Issues are released weekly, every Thursday. The magazine include news and reviews about the club, interviews with the players.

== See also ==
- List of newspapers in Egypt
