= Mustafa Kamel Murad =

Egyptian military officer and politician (1927–1998)

Mustafa Kamel Murad (Arabic: مصطفى كامل مراد, 28 November 1927 – 1998) was an Egyptian military officer and politician.

== Military career ==
Murad graduated from the military college in 1948. That same year, as a field artillery officer, he participated in the 1948 Arab–Israeli War. Because of his performance in that war, he received Palestine Golden Medal in 1948 and the Worthiness Silver Order in 1951. He sustained injuries during the hostilities in Palestine for which he traveled to the United Kingdom for treatment. In January 1949, Murad had joined the Free Officers movement, along with Kamal el-Din Hussein, which aimed at toppling the Egyptian Monarchy.

He took on the role Chief of Staff of Artillery of the armored force during the coup on 23 July 1952, which removed King Farouk from power and installed the Egyptian Revolutionary Command Council (RCC) to rule Egypt for an interim period. Murad later traveled to the United States in 1953 to complete his earlier treatment in the UK.

== Political career ==
Murad was appointed as a member of the RCC and served as director of Minister of Education's office in 1954 and obtained a bachelor's degree in commerce from Cairo University the same year. He also received the Liberation Medal in 1954. Murad resigned from the Egyptian Armed Forces in 1956 and was given the Evacuation Medal. The next year, he obtained a diploma in political science from Cairo University. From 1958 to 1968 he became Chairman of the Eastern Cotton Company. He was a member of the Arab Socialist Union from 1962 and became part of its secret unit, the Socialist Vanguard (Arabic: al-Tanzim al-Tali‘i), which was also called the Vanguard Organization, in 1963 when the unit was established. From 1969 to 1979, Murad was a member of the People's Assembly of Egypt. During this period, in 1975, he served as the Chairman of Chamber of Commerce in Cairo and established the Al Ahrar Party or Liberal Socialists Party as an opposition party to Anwar Sadat's presidency in 1976. Murad published a gazette, Al Ahrar, for the party in 1977.

== Death ==
Murad died in 1998, he passed away in a hospital following a period of illness and a long battle with a health condition.
