= Al-Badeel =

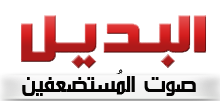
- Format: print/online daily
- Founder: Mohamed El-Sayed Said
- Publisher: Future Foundation for Press, Media, and Advertising
- Editor: Mohamed Ziada
- Founded: July 16, 2007
- Ceased publication: November 2015
- Political alignment: independent
- Language: Arabic

Al-Badeel (Arabic: البديل, lit. "the alternative") was a privately owned Arabic-language Egyptian newspaper known for its left-wing orientation. Its first issue was published on July 16, 2007. It was founded by Mohamed El-Sayed Said, vice-president of the Al-Ahram Center for Political and Strategic Studies and Al-Badeel editor-in-chief from its founding until September 2008, when he was replaced by Khaled al-Balshi.

== History ==
Print publication ended on April 10, 2009, due mainly to lack of funds. The Board of the Progress for Peace and Advertising Company, the publisher, tried unsuccessfully to raise capital. Al-Balshi and a number of the journalists revived the publication in electronic form in November 2010. Rumors circulated in 2011–12 about a complete end of the publication after a series of strikes and factional protests among the journalists. Controversies included Ibrahim Eissa's appointment as Editor-in-Chief and allegedly arbitrary dismissals of some journalists. In November 2015, publication ended due to poor circulation.

== Arrests and injuries of journalists ==
Arrests and injuries of Al-Badeel journalists began to occur before the Egyptian revolution of 2011:

- Journalist Youssef Shaaban was arrested on charges of drug possession after participating in a solidarity march on Abou Soliman Street for residents displaced by gentrification in the Mahatet El Raml neighborhood of Alexandria
- Journalists Ahmed Ramadan and Islam Abu Al-Ezz were referred to military tribunals after the 2012 Abbassia protest, leading to declarations of solidarity with them by several political movements
- Two employees, journalist Sara Ramadan and photojournalist Hassan Al-Banna Mubarak, were attacked by conservative firebrand imam Ahmed Muhammad Mahmoud Abdullah (nicknamed "Abu Islam"), head of the Ummah Channel and the Islamic Enlightenment Center, during an interview on 9 October 2012; their colleagues claimed Abu Islam had beaten and detained them afterwards, whence the police were contacted

== Contributors ==
Prominent contributors included satirist Galal Amer, journalist Syed Mahmoud, and Kamal Helbawy.
