= Youm7 =

Egyptian privately owned daily newspaper

- Type: Daily
- Format: Compact
- Owner: Egyptian Media Group (owned by United Media Services)
- Publisher: Egyptian Journalism, Publishing and Advertisement "المصرية للصحافة والنشر والإعلان"
- Editor: Ola Elshafey
- Founded: October 2008; 17 years ago
- Political alignment: Independent reformist/liberal
- Headquarters: Giza, Egypt
- Website: www.youm7.com

Youm7 (Arabic: اليوم السابع, IPA: [iljoːm issaːbiʕ], meaning The Seventh Day) is an Egyptian privately owned daily newspaper. It was first published as a weekly paper in October 2008 and has been published daily since May 2011. It is published in Arabic. The paper was twice selected by Forbes Middle East as having the best news website in the Middle East. Youm7 reportedly has the most-visited website of any Egyptian newspaper. On 6 October 2013 it launched an English news website called The Cairo Post.

== History ==
=== Founding and profile ===
Youm7 was first published as a weekly paper in October 2008 and has been published daily since 31 May 2011. Editor Khaled Salah said shortly after the paper's expansion to daily publication that Youm7 "supports the popular need for a civil state and will strive to present facts to readers without political bias and with credible representation of diverse views."

According to internet information service Alexa Internet, 59% of visitors to Youm7's website come from Egypt, and compared to internet users overall they are disproportionately higher-income college graduates and women browsing from home. In 2012, the paper's online version was the sixth most-visited website in Egypt based on the Alexa data. In 2014 the paper launched a new website, Photo7, which is a portal for pictures in Egypt and the Arab world.

Youm7 was named by Industry Arabic as the second most influential Arabic paper in 2020.

=== Ownership ===
As of September 2020, Youm7 was owned by Egyptian Media Group, which was owned by United Media Services, which was itself owned by one of the Egyptian intelligence agencies (Mukhabarat, military intelligence, National Security Agency).

=== The Cairo Post ===
On 6 October 2013 Youm7 launched an English-language website called The Cairo Post, under the direction of Sallie Pisch, who also directed the organization's short-lived 'Youm7 English Edition' in 2011 (see below).

In an article published on the day the website launched, Pisch wrote that the goal for The Cairo Post was for it "to become the news outlet to most faithfully portray Egypt, in all her intricacies, to all those who watch her and want to understand."

As of November 2013, the website was publishing roughly 200 stories daily, a combination of original content, articles translated from Youm7's Arabic news website, and wire services.

=== Youm7 English Edition ===
On 8 August 2011, managing director Sallie Pisch announced the launch of Youm7 English Edition, stating that the English-language paper aimed to fill the gap in "quality, understandable news coverage coming out of Egypt in English." Youm7 English Edition also managed an Egypt Wiki that "aims to provide background info on Egyptian politicians, public figures and organizations in one location." As of 2 May 2012, the Youm7 English Edition appears to no longer be functioning, as the link to the English Edition homepage redirects to the Youm7 Arabic site. On 13 December 2012, the English Edition Twitter profile tweeted "Dear followers, we are currently having a problem with our website. We hope to get it figured out and back online soon!" As of 2 May 2012, the Youm7 English Edition Twitter profile's last tweet was published on 21 December 2012.

=== Political Coverage ===
The paper's politicized coverage since the 2011 Egyptian Revolution has led to calls for its boycott. Online activists in Egypt also accused the paper of fabricating news and spreading misinformation, and at one point urged Twitter users to unfollow any profiles associated with the paper. The paper's English-language website was also hacked in July 2011, taking it offline. In May 2012, Youm7 was again accused of fabricating the news after publishing a report alleging that the Muslim Brotherhood's Freedom and Justice Party had organized medical convoys to provide free female genital mutilation operations to girls. The Ministry of Health immediately announced an investigation, however no other media outlet was able to confirm the allegations. The Freedom and Justice Party denied the allegations.

== Criticism ==
=== Racism ===
In August 2014, Youm7 published a page with the headline: "Black Terror Gangs in Cairo" including a picture of black skinned people holding guns and the word "Niggers" on it, it drew criticism from Egyptian activists and international media, calling the newspaper hateful and racist.

== See also ==
- List of newspapers in Egypt
