= Al Maarif =

Daily newspaper in Egypt

Al Maarif is an Arabic daily newspaper that has been published in Egypt since 1963.

== History and profile ==
Al Maarif was established in 1963. The paper is one of the state-owned publications in the country.

== See also ==
- List of newspapers in Egypt
