= Khaled Mohieddin =

Egyptian politician (1922–2018)

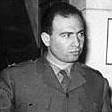

Personal details
- Born: August 17, 1922 Cairo, Kingdom of Egypt
- Died: May 6, 2018 (aged 95) Cairo, Egypt
- Occupation: Chief editor of Al Masa (1956–59); Secretary of ASU Press Committee (1964–65); Head of NPUP (1976–2018)

Military service
- Branch/service: Egyptian Army
- Rank: Major
- Battles/wars: First Arab-Israeli War; Egyptian Revolution of 1952

Khaled Mohieddine (Egyptian Arabic: خالد محيي الدين, IPA: [ˈxæːled ˈmoħj edˈdiːn]; August 17, 1922 – May 6, 2018) was an Egyptian military officer, revolutionary and politician. As a member of the Free Officers Movement, he participated in the toppling of King Farouk that began the Egyptian Revolution of 1952, and led to the establishment of the Republic of Egypt.

Mohieddine held important political and media roles throughout Gamal Abdel Nasser's presidency, although the two also had a number of fallings out. An outspoken individual, he was one of the few members of the revolutionary inner circle of Egypt able to disagree passionately with Nasser whilst still retaining Nasser's respect and admiration. His political influence diminished during the early part of Anwar Sadat's presidency until he cofounded a leftist political party, National Progressive Union Party (Tagammu), in 1976.

Under Mohieddine's leadership, Tagammu became a significant opposition force during Hosni Mubarak's rule.

== Early life ==
Mohieddine was born in Kafr Shukr (Qalyubia) Lower Egypt in 1922 to a well-off family that owned sizeable landholdings in the Nile Delta area. He graduated from the Egyptian Military Academy in 1940 and served as a cavalry officer. In 1942, he befriended Gamal Abdel Nasser at a military college. In 1943–44, he joined the Free Officers Movement, becoming one of the ten original members. His cousin, Zakaria, was also a member of this group.

In 1951, he received a bachelor's degree in commerce from the University of Cairo (then known as Fuad University). He adopted Marxism but, although he had ties with the Communist-oriented Democratic Movement for National Liberation, Mohieddine did not actually join the organization.

== Political life under Nasser ==
By the spring of 1952, the Free Officers devised an operational command to depose King Farouk, with Mohieddine responsible for the armored corps. On July 23, he commanded his armed units through Cairo and the coup was successfully undertaken. He and Nasser wrote the first proclamation of the "revolution" on Cairo Radio. Mohieddine attended the ceremonious departure of the king and, according to him, Farouk stated to the attending officers that he "thought of doing the same thing they were doing."

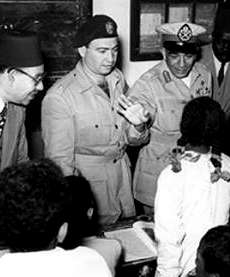
Mohieddin addressing members of the Egyptian Revolutionary Command Council, 1954

After Muhammad Naguib was made president, Mohieddine became a part of the Egyptian Revolutionary Command Council (RCC). When army officers loyal to Nasser kidnapped Naguib in February 1954, Mohieddine unexpectedly ordered Naguib be released immediately and he was. He explained the reason he took that action was because he felt Nasser and the Free Officers could not rule Egypt without Naguib. Nasser, who was prime minister, responded to his move by dismissing all the officers loyal to him. At the advice of his cousin and fellow RCC member, Zakaria Mohieddine, Khaled dropped out of sight for a few days after the protest, returning to Cairo on March 5. The RCC members, including Mohieddine, agreed that he be sent to Europe as part of trade mission. According to close sources, his parting with Nasser was sober but not devoid of "shared sorrow". The Egyptian regime designated him as a representative of the RCC abroad, leaving the impression that his informal exile was temporary.

With Nasser officially assuming the presidency and the end of the Suez Crisis in 1956, Mohieddine returned to Egypt and took a leading role in the government, being put in charge of the evening Al Messa' newspaper which he founded. He was also the publisher of the daily. A year later he served in the central committee of the National Union and was elected a member of the National Assembly. He was one of four people appointed by Nasser to set up the first conference of the Afro-Asian Peoples' Solidarity Organization during 1957–58. Mohieddine later chaired the Egyptian Peace Council and henceforth became a member of the World Peace Council's presidential council in 1958.

On March 8, 1959, an Arab nationalist rebellion broke out in Mosul, Iraq, with the intent of deposing the anti-Nasser and pro-Communist president Abdel Karim Qasim. When it was put down, Nasser's anti-Communism feelings apparently deepened and he accused Mohieddine of supporting Qasim. Nasser subsequently unceremoniously fired him and twelve other editors from Al Messa on March 13. Mohieddine was soon arrested and remained incarcerated until the end of 1960. He became board chairman of Akhbar al-Yawm in 1964. In April 1965, after Nasser began taking a more pro-Soviet stance on domestic affairs, Mohieddine was appointed secretary of the Arab Socialist Union's (ASU) Press Committee. Around this time he also chaired the Aswan High Dam committee and was awarded the Lenin Peace Prize in 1970.

== Later life ==
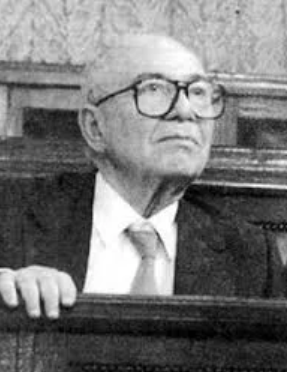
Mohieddine giving a speech in parliament as leader of the National Progressive Unionist Rally Party.

Because of his politics, Mohieddine was imprisoned for two months in the 1971 Corrective Revolution launched by Anwar Sadat who became president after Nasser's death the year before. Within the ASU, Kamal Rifaat and he soon took leadership of the leftist platform that later evolved into the National Progressive Union Party (also referred to as "Tagammu") in 1976. Mohieddine was one of its three delegates elected to the People's Assembly that same year.

He was suspected by government authorities of inciting the 1977 Egyptian Bread Riots. In 1978, he founded and edited his party's press organ, Al Ahali. The next year he was charged with activities "against the state" but was not tried. Because he was a former RCC member, Mohieddine was spared when Sadat jailed other dissidents in 1981. He continued to practice politics and was considered a part of the "loyal opposition" to President Hosni Mubarak. In 1990, he won a parliamentary seat after three defeats.

His nephew, Minister of Investment Mahmoud Mohieddin, announced he had abandoned plans to stand for election in the Kafr el-Shukr electoral district in October 2005, standing aside in favor of Khaled Mohieddin, who failed to win election. Following the death of his cousin Zakaria Mohieddin in 2012, he was the last survivor of the Free Officers council that led the 1952 Revolution. Mohieddine died on May 6, 2018, at a hospital in the Maadi district of Cairo at the age of 95.

== Selected works ==
- Memories of a Revolution: Egypt 1952. (1995). Cairo: American University in Cairo Press.
- For This We Oppose Mubarak. (1987). Cairo.
