= Assassination of Anwar Sadat =

1981 assassination in Cairo, Egypt

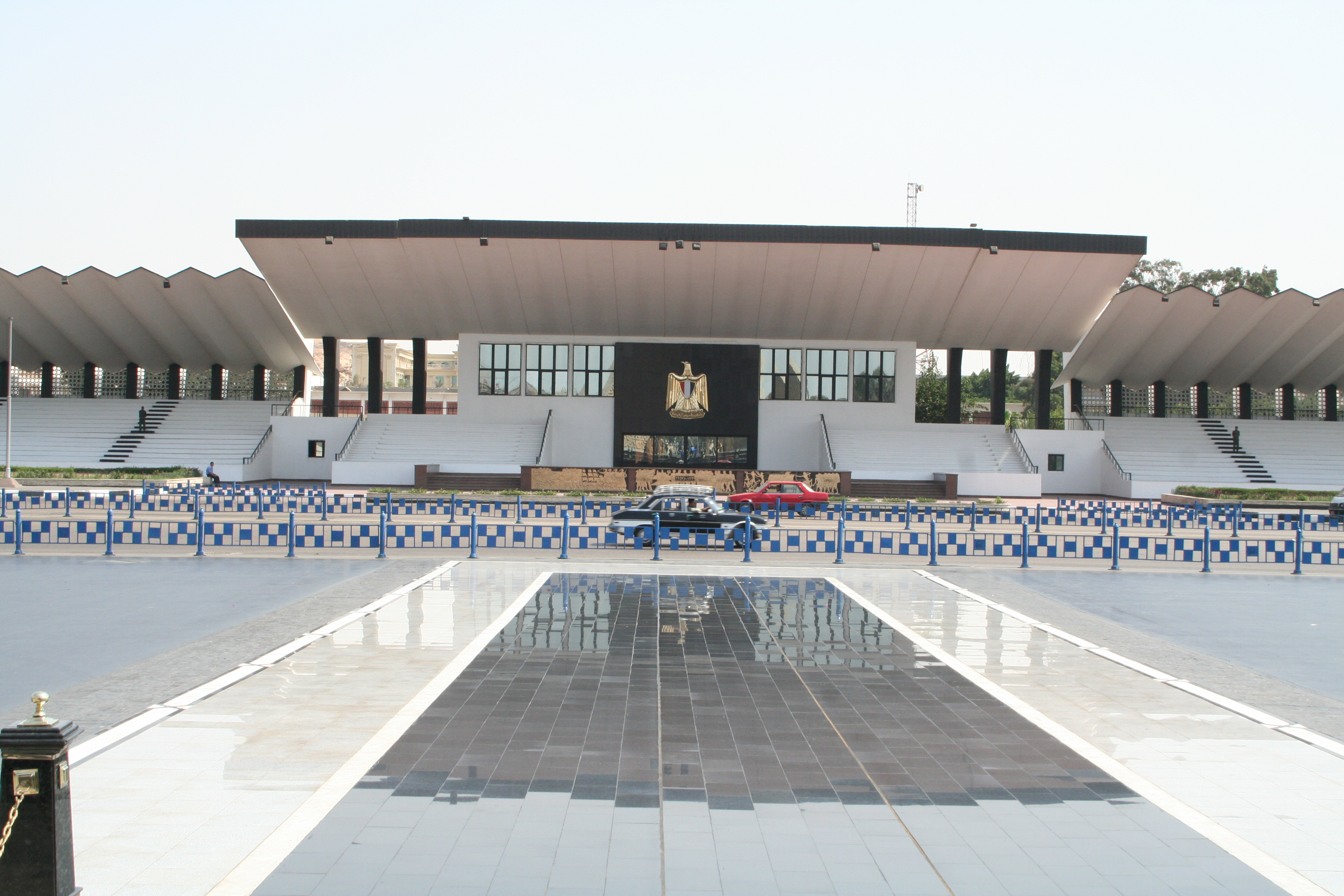
- Platform where Anwar Sadat was assassinated
- Location: 30°3′51.23″N 31°18′53.27″E; Cairo, Egypt
- Date: 6 October 1981; 45 years ago
- Target: Anwar Sadat
- Deaths: 11 (including Anwar Sadat)
- Perpetrators: Egyptian Islamic Jihad, namely Muhammad Abd al-Salam Faraj and an assassination squad led by Khalid Al-Islambuli
- Assailants: Khalid Al-Islambuli; Muhammad Abd al-Salam Faraj; Hussein Abbas Mohammed; Atta Tayel Hemeida; Abdel-Hamad Abdel-Salem Abdel-Aal
- Defenders: Sadat bodyguards and soldiers
- Motive: Opposition to Sadat's government and its recognition of Israel

On 6 October 1981, Anwar Sadat, the 3rd president of Egypt, was assassinated during the annual victory parade held in Cairo to celebrate the victory over Israel in the Yom Kippur War. The assassination was undertaken by members of the Egyptian Islamic Jihad. Although the motive has been debated, Sadat's assassination likely stemmed from communist, socialist, and Islamist groups opposed to Sadat's peace initiative with Israel and the United States relating to the Camp David Accords.

== Background ==
The 1979 Egypt–Israel Peace Treaty was received with controversy among Arab nations, particularly the Palestinians. Egypt's membership in the Arab League was suspended (and not reinstated until 1989). PLO Leader Yasser Arafat said "Let them sign what they like. False peace will not last." In Egypt, various jihadist groups, such as Egyptian Islamic Jihad and al-Jama'a al-Islamiyya, used the Camp David Accords to rally support for their cause. Previously sympathetic to Sadat's attempt to integrate them into Egyptian society, Egypt's Islamists now felt betrayed, and publicly called for the overthrow of the Egyptian president and the replacement of the nation's system of government with a government based on Islamic theocracy.

The last months of Sadat's presidency were marked by internal uprising. He dismissed allegations that the rioting was incited by domestic issues, believing that the Soviet Union was recruiting its regional allies in Libya and Syria to incite an uprising that would eventually force him out of power. Following a failed military coup in June 1981, Sadat ordered a major crackdown that resulted in the arrest of numerous opposition figures. Though he still maintained high levels of popularity in Egypt, it has been said that he was assassinated "at the peak" of his unpopularity.

=== Egyptian Islamic Jihad ===
Earlier in Sadat's presidency, Islamists had benefited from the "rectification revolution" and the release from prison of activists jailed under Gamal Abdel Nasser, but his Sinai treaty with Israel enraged Islamists, particularly the radical Egyptian Islamic Jihad. According to interviews and information gathered by journalist Lawrence Wright, the group was recruiting military officers and accumulating weapons, waiting for the right moment to launch "a complete overthrow of the existing order" in Egypt. The chief strategist of the Islamic Jihad was Aboud El Zomor, a colonel in the military intelligence whose "plan was to kill the main leaders of the country, capture the headquarters of the army and State Security, the telephone exchange building, and of course the radio and television building, where news of the Islamic revolution would then be broadcast, unleashing—he expected—a popular uprising against secular authority all over the country."

In February 1981, Egyptian authorities were alerted to the Islamic Jihad's plan by the arrest of an operative carrying crucial information. In September, Sadat ordered a highly unpopular roundup of more than 1,500 people, including many Jihad members, but also the Coptic Pope and other Coptic clergy, intellectuals and activists of all ideological stripes. All non-government press was banned as well. The roundup missed a jihad cell in the military led by Lieutenant Khalid Al-Islambuli, who would succeed in assassinating Anwar Sadat that October. However, while Al-Islambuli led the assassination squad, the assassination plot altogether was led by Muhammad Abd al-Salam Faraj, an Egyptian Islamic Jihad member who was a civilian engineer.

According to Tal'at Fu'ad Qasim, ex-head of the Gama'a Islamiyya ('Assembly of Islam'; known as "Islamic Group" in English), it was not Islamic Jihad but his organization that planned the assassination and recruited the assassin, al-Islambuli. In an interview with human rights lawyer and activist Hisham Mubarak published in the Middle East Report, Qasim completely denies the involvement of Islamic Jihad in the plot. Members of the group's Majlis el-Shura ('Consultative Council')—headed by the famed "blind shaykh"—were arrested two weeks before the killing. The group's existing plans were not uncovered, and al-Islambuli succeeded in assassinating Sadat.

== Assassination ==
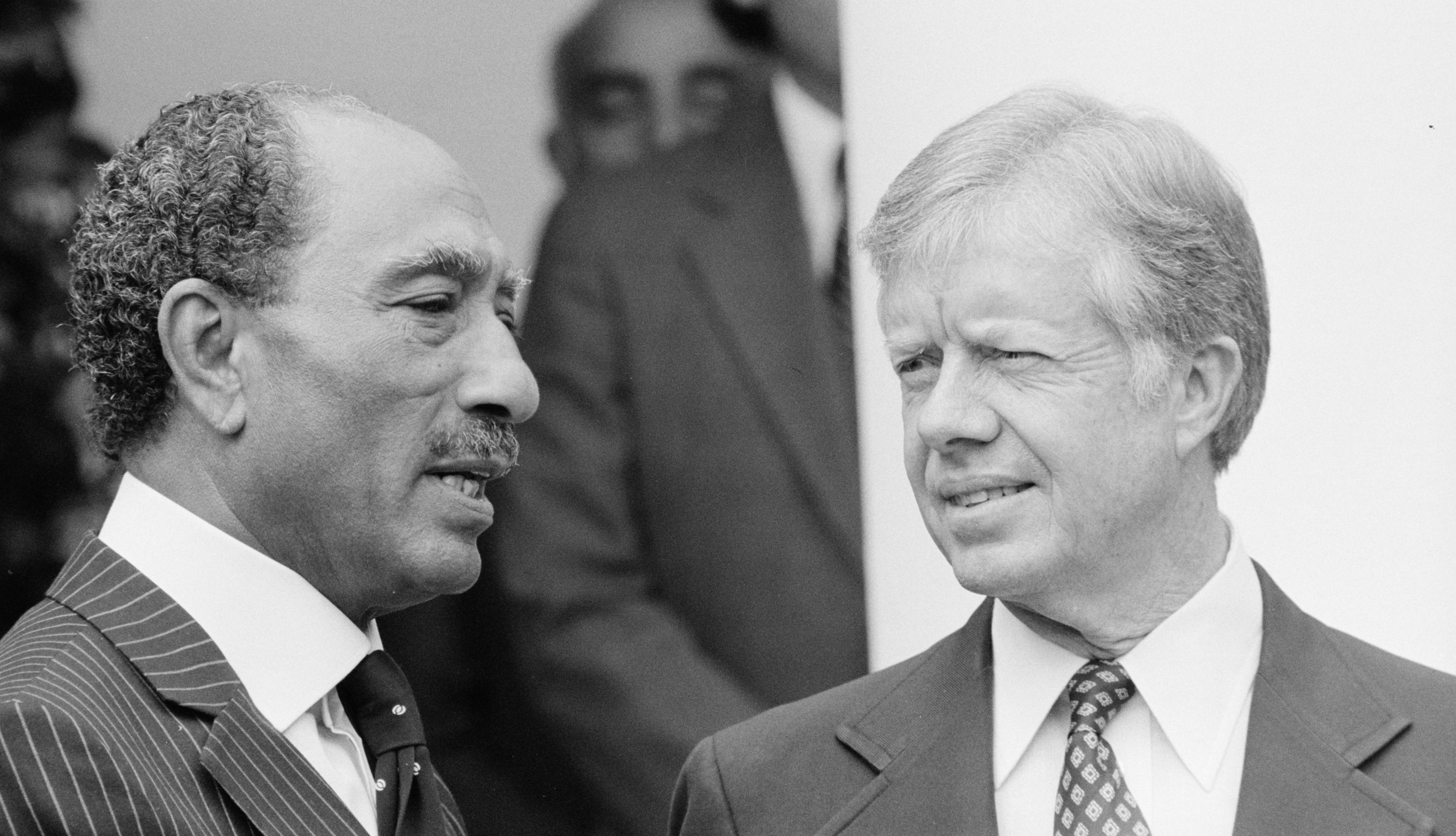
Sadat (left) with U.S. President Jimmy Carter (right) in Washington, D.C., on 8 April 1980, during a visit to the White House.

On 6 October 1981, a victory parade was held in Cairo to commemorate the eighth anniversary of Egypt's crossing of the Suez Canal during the Yom Kippur War. Sadat was protected by four layers of security and eight bodyguards, and the army parade should have been safe due to ammunition-seizure rules. As Egyptian Air Force Mirage jets flew overhead, distracting the crowd, Egyptian Army soldiers and troop trucks towing artillery paraded by. One truck contained the assassination squad, led by Lieutenant Al-Islambuli. As it passed the tribune, Al-Islambuli forced the driver at gunpoint to stop. From there, the assassins dismounted and Al-Islambuli approached Sadat with three hand grenades concealed under his helmet. Sadat stood to receive his salute; Anwar's nephew Talaat El Sadat later said, "The president thought the killers were part of the show when they approached the stands firing, so he stood up saluting them", whereupon Al-Islambuli threw all his grenades at Sadat, only one of which exploded (but fell short), and additional assassins exited the truck, firing into the stands until they had exhausted their ammunition, and then attempted to flee. After Sadat was hit and fell to the ground, people threw chairs around him to shield him from the hail of bullets.

The attack lasted about two minutes. Sadat and ten others were killed outright or suffered fatal wounds, including Major General Hassan Allam, Khalfan Nasser Mohammed (a general from the Omani delegation), Eng. Samir Helmy Ibrahim, Mohammed Yousuf Rashwan (the presidential photographer), Saeed Abdel Raouf Bakr, and Chinese military-affiliated aerospace engineer Zhang Baoyu (张宝玉), as well as the Cuban ambassador to Egypt and Coptic Orthodox bishop Anba Samuel.

Twenty-eight were wounded, including Vice President Hosni Mubarak, Irish Defence Minister James Tully, Sayed Marei, advisor to Anwar Sadat, Belgian ambassador Claude Ruelle, and four United States Armed Forces liaison officers. Security forces were momentarily stunned, but reacted within 45 seconds. The Swedish ambassador Olov Ternström managed to escape safely. Egyptian state television, which was broadcasting the parade live, quickly cut to military music and Quranic recitations. One of the attackers was killed, and the three others injured and arrested. Sadat was airlifted to a military hospital, and died nearly two hours later. Sadat's death was attributed to "violent nervous shock and internal bleeding in the chest cavity, where the left lung and major blood vessels below it were torn."

== Aftermath ==
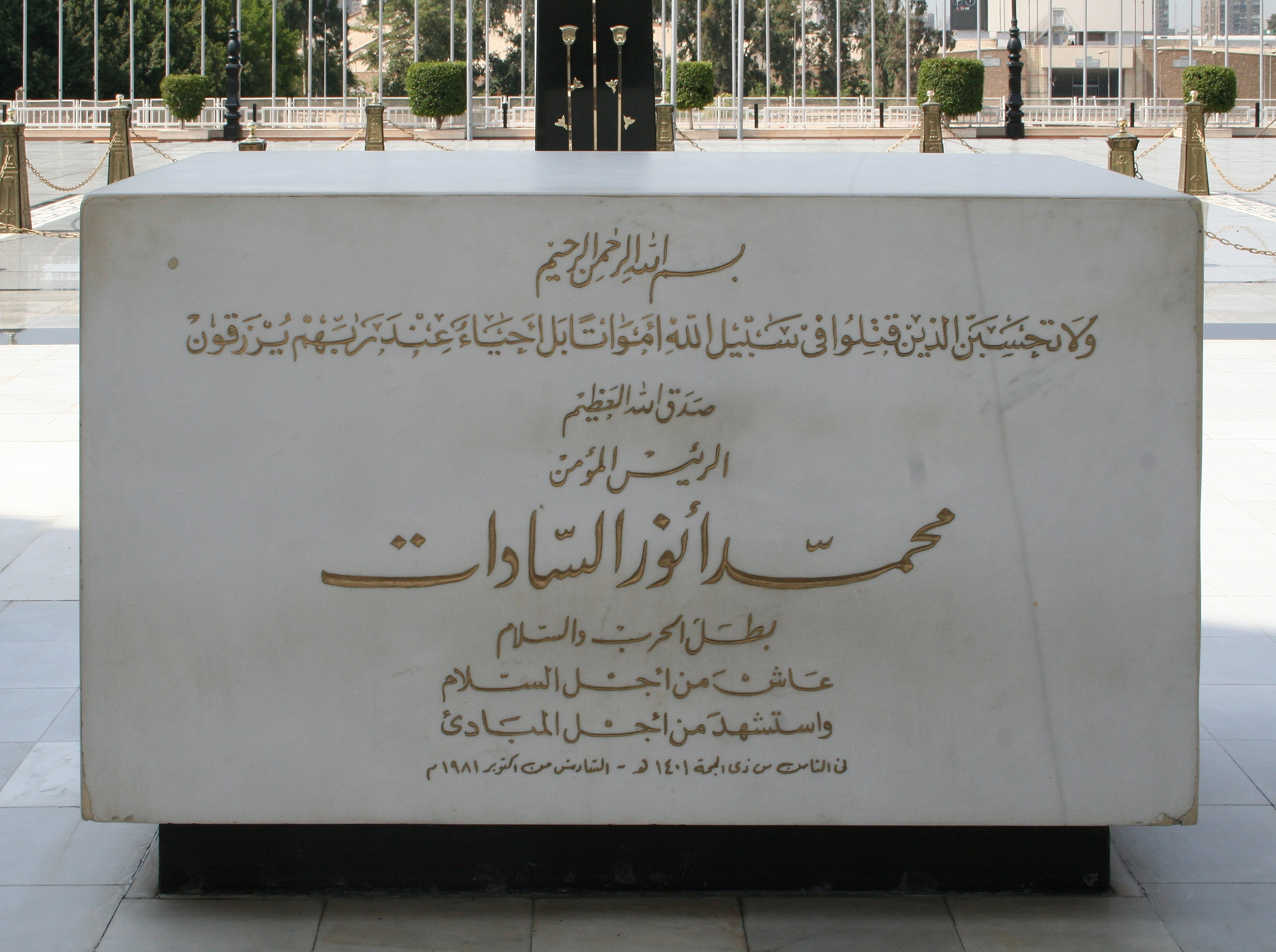
A marker at the Unknown Soldier Memorial, where Sadat is buried.

In conjunction with the assassination, an insurrection was organized in Asyut in Upper Egypt. Rebels took control of the security services HQ for a day and held off government forces for another day. Six attackers and 68 policemen and soldiers were killed in the fighting. Government control was not restored until paratroopers from Cairo arrived and the Air Force scrambled a pair of jets to intimidate the militants. Most of the militants convicted of fighting received light sentences and served only three years in prison.

The assassination was generally greeted with enthusiasm from governments in the Islamic world, which regarded Sadat as a traitor for the Egypt–Israel peace treaty. The state newspaper of Syria, Tishreen, carried the headline "Egypt Today Bids Farewell to the Ultimate Traitor", while Iran named a street in Tehran after Al-Islambuli. President Siad Barre of Somalia and President Gaafar Nimeiry of Sudan, along with deposed Iranian Crown Prince Reza Pahlavi, were the only Muslim political leaders to attend Sadat's funeral.

Sadat was initially succeeded by Sufi Abu Taleb, Speaker of the People's Assembly, who assumed office as acting President and immediately declared a state of emergency. Eight days later on 14 October 1981, Sadat's Vice President, Hosni Mubarak, was sworn in as the new Egyptian President, remaining in office for nearly 30 years until his resignation as a result of the 2011 Egyptian revolution.

By April 1982, 19 people would be criminally tried for Sadat's assassination. 17 would be jailed, while two would be acquitted. Five of those tried would be executed in 1982. Of these five people who were executed, four of them-Islambouli, Sergeant Hussein Abbas Mohammed, and civilians Atta Tayel Hemeida and Abdel-Hamad Abdel-Salem Abdel-Aal, were in the assassination squad which charged the viewing stand where Sadat was watching the military parade at the time of his assassination. Al-Salam Faraj would be convicted for leading the assassination plot and be executed as well.

=== Burial ===
Sadat was buried in the Unknown Soldier Memorial, located in the Nasr City district of Cairo. The inscription on his grave reads: "The hero of war and peace". The funeral was attended by three former Presidents of the United States—Richard Nixon, Gerald R. Ford, and Jimmy Carter—as well as Israeli Prime Minister Menachem Begin, British Foreign Secretary Lord Carrington with former Prime Minister James Callaghan, French President François Mitterrand, West German Chancellor Helmut Schmidt, Italian President Sandro Pertini, Irish President Patrick Hillery, Spanish Prime Minister Leopoldo Calvo-Sotelo, and King Baudouin of Belgium. The sitting U.S. President Ronald Reagan, who had survived an assassination attempt of his own several months prior, opted not to attend because of the tense political situation, although his administration were represented by Secretary of State Alexander Haig, Secretary of Defense Caspar Weinberger, and Ambassador to the United Nations Jeane Kirkpatrick. Stevie Wonder and Walter Cronkite also attended.

=== Execution of assassins ===
Al-Islambuli and the other assassins were tried, convicted, and sentenced to death. They were executed on 15 April 1982, the two army men by firing squad led by Colonel Mohamed Abdel Samie, and the three civilians by hanging.

== See also ==
- Assassination of Yitzhak Rabin
- Egypt–Israel relations
- The Execution of a Pharaoh – 2008 Iranian documentary about Anwar Sadat's assassination
- History of Egypt under Anwar Sadat
- History of Egypt under Gamal Abdel Nasser
- History of modern Egypt
- Camp David Accords
