= Siham Bayyumi =

Egyptian writer and journalist

Siham Bayyumi (Arabic: سهام بيومي; born 1949) is an Egyptian writer and journalist. She was born in Cairo and received a bachelor's degree in social science from Helwan University in 1974. She has worked as a journalist at the Cairo newspaper Al Gomhuria, and has published works of both fiction and non-fiction. Her books include the short story collection Al-Khayl Wa-Al-Layl. Her historical novel Ayyam al-Qabbuti dealt with the excavation of the Suez Canal. Her work has been translated into Italian by Elisabetta Bartuli and appeared in a 2001 anthology titled Rose del Cairo.

== Selected works ==
- Kharait Lil-Mawj
- Al-Khayl Wa-Al-Layl: Qisas Qasirah
- Ayyam al Qabbuti
