= Ebrahim Nafae =

Egyptian journalist

- ابراهيم نافع
- Born: 12 January 1934; Suez, Suez Governorate, Egypt
- Died: 1 January 2018 (aged 83); Dubai, Emirate of Dubai, UAE
- Education: Ain Shams University (BA)
- Occupation: Journalist

Ebrahim Nafae (Arabic: ابراهيم نافع) (12 January 1934 – 1 January 2018) was an Egyptian journalist. He was editor of the Egyptian newspaper Al-Ahram from 1979 to 2005 and chair of the General Union of Arab Journalists from 1996 to 2012.

== Biography ==
Born in Suez, he received a bachelor's degree from Ain Shams University in 1956 before beginning his career as a Reuters reporter. He then became an editor at Egyptian Radio and an economy editor of the state-owned Al Gomhuria. Nafae worked at Al-Ahram as head of the economy section and deputy editor-in-chief.

He was editor-in-chief of Al-Ahram from 1979 to 2005, and he was later appointed CEO of the newspaper. Haaretz wrote that Nafae "faithfully transmitted" the policies of Egyptian Presidents Anwar Sadat and Hosni Mubarak and that as president of the Egyptian Journalists Syndicate, he "shaped Egypt's propaganda policy and defined the borders of self-censorship by the press." Nafae was replaced by Salah El-Ghamri as board chair and Osama Saraya as editor-in-chief. The Shura Council appointed Nafae to be a member of the Higher Press Council.

Nafae served for over a decade as chair of Egypt's independent since 1985 and of the General Union of Arab Journalists from 1996 to 2012. Nafae was close to President Mubarak, and after the 2011 uprising, left to France for medical checkups. His health deteriorated in late 2017, and several writers called for Egyptian authorities to allow him to return to the country. Nafae died of cancer on 1 January 2018, 11 days before his 84th birthday, in Dubai after undergoing surgery.

== Bibliography ==
- Winds of Democracy (Arabic)
- Years of Danger (Arabic)
