= Al Ahrar (weekly) =

Weekly newspaper in Egypt (1977–2013)

- Type: Weekly newspaper
- Founder: Liberal Party
- Publisher: Liberal Party
- Founded: November 1977
- Ceased publication: 2013
- Political alignment: Liberal
- Language: Arabic
- Headquarters: Cairo
- Country: Egypt

Al Ahrar (Arabic: الأحرار, lit. 'the Free' or 'the Liberal') was a weekly newspaper published in Cairo, Egypt, from 1977 to 2013. The paper was the official media outlet of the Liberal Party.

== History and profile ==
Al Ahrar was established during the Sadat era in 1977 and was based in Cairo. The first issue appeared in November that year.

It was one of the highest circulation papers in the country owned by a political party. The weekly had a liberal political leaning and was one of the major opposition publications in Egypt. In November 1982 Al Ahrar attacked the advertisements of the Islamic investment companies. It supported Egyptian President Anwar Sadat's liberal and capitalist economy policies and also, fast harmony with the Western countries. On the other hand, Al Ahrar was one of the major critics of Baháʼí Egyptians.

As of 1996 the editor-in-chief of the paper was Mustapha Bakri who had a Nasserist political stance. Due to his support for Gamal Abdel Nasser the chairman of the Liberal Party Mustafa Kamel Murad who was a member of the Free Officers movement fired Bakri. Bakri attempted to continue his editorship, but was forced to resign from the post through the intervention of Egyptian security forces. Al Ahrar sold 5,000 copies in 2005. In 2013, the paper ceased publication.

== Incidents ==
In September 1997 when the pro-Islamic biweekly Al Shaab was banned by the government Al Ahrar run a page for it in its third page. In December 2012, Al Ahrar along with others went on strike for one day to protest the draft constitution presented by the Egyptian government.

== See also ==
- List of newspapers in Egypt
