= Al Messa =

Daily newspaper in Egypt

Al Messa المساء
- Al Messa logo
- Type: Daily
- Format: Broadsheet
- Publisher: Al Tahrir Publishing House
- Founded: 1 October 1956; 69 years ago
- Headquarters: Ramsees, Cairo, Egypt
- Website: almessa.gomhuriaonline.com

Al Messa (Arabic: المساء, lit. 'The Evening') is an Arabic daily newspaper published in Cairo, Egypt.

== History and profile ==
Al Masaa was founded in October 1956. From its start to March 1959 the paper was edited by Marxist and leftist journalists. During this period Lutfi Al Khuli was the editor of a column addressed the workers, and the paper employed the colloquial Arabic which was considered to be the major language variety of the workers and peasants. The use of the colloquial Arabic ended in March 1959 when the Marxist and leftist editors were dismissed.

In the 1960s, Khaled Mohieddin was made the publisher of the daily. It is issued by Al Tahrir Publishing House along with Al Gomhuria newspaper and some other publications. As of 2013 Samia Zein Al Abideen was the deputy editor of the daily.
