= Khalid Al-Islambuli =

Egyptian Islamist

Khalid al-Islambuli خالد الإسلامبولي
- Islambouli in 1982
- Born: 15 January 1955; Minya Governorate, Republic of Egypt
- Died: 15 April 1982 (aged 27); Egypt
- Cause of death: Execution by firing squad
- Military career
- Allegiance: Egypt; Egyptian Islamic Jihad
- Branch: Egyptian Army
- Service years: 1976–1981
- Rank: First Lieutenant
- Unit: 17th Artillery Regiment
- Criminal information
- Status: Executed
- Conviction: Assassinating President Anwar Sadat
- Penalty: Death

Khalid al-Islambuli (Arabic: خالد الإسلامبولي, romanized: Khālid al-ʾIslāmbūlī; 15 January 1955 – 15 April 1982) was an Egyptian military officer who participated in the assassination of Egyptian president Anwar Sadat, during the annual 6th October victory parade on 6 October 1981. Al-Islambuli stated that his primary motivation for the assassination was Sadat's signing of the Camp David Accords with Israel and Sadat's plan for a more progressive Egypt. Al-Islambuli was tried before an Egyptian court-martial, found guilty, and sentenced to death by firing squad. Following his execution, he was declared a martyr by many in the Islamic world, and became an inspirational symbol for Islamic movements as one of the first 'modern martyrs of Islam'.

== Early years and career ==
Islambouli was born in Minya Governorate. His father, Ahmad Shawqi, was an Upper Egyptian legal advisor and his mother, Qadria Ali Yusuf, was of Turkish descent.

After graduating from the Egyptian Military Academy, he was commissioned as an officer in the Artillery Forces of the Egyptian Army with the rank of second lieutenant. Sometime after this appointment, Islambouli joined the proscribed Egyptian Islamic Jihad movement. Between 1976 and 1980, he served mostly as a staff officer or as fire direction officer for various artillery batteries, battalions and regiments. In March 1980, he got his first field command, an artillery platoon gun line in the 116th Field Artillery Brigade based in Cairo. His command included three 'active' field howitzers, a reserve field gun, five to six transport trucks, seven jeeps, signaling equipment, light infantry weapons such as assault rifles, medium machine guns, anti-tank rockets, light mortars, and sniper rifles for organic defence, and around 45 soldiers/conscripts, with a second lieutenant and a sergeant acting as second-in-command and third-in-command respectively. His role was to take firing missions and orders from the Battery HQ.

== Assassination of Sadat ==
Islambouli and his platoon originally were not supposed to participate in the October parade, but they were chosen by the Military Intelligence, which was infiltrated by Islamist sympathizers under Colonel Abbud al-Zumar, to replace a platoon from the 133rd Artillery Battalion which was excused from participation for apparently failing some routine tests and checks.

Once his platoon containing three heavy trucks towing M-46 field artillery guns began to approach the President's platform, Islambouli, along with Junior Sergeant Abdelhameed Abdul Salaam, 31, Corporal Ata Tayel Hameeda Raheel, 21, and Corporal Hussein Abbas, 21, leapt from their truck and ran towards the stand while lobbing grenades toward where the President was standing with other Egyptian and foreign dignitaries.

== Execution ==
Islambouli was captured immediately after the assassination. He and twenty-three conspirators, including eight military personnel, were tried before an Egyptian court-martial. Found guilty of murder, 27-year-old Islambouli was executed by firing squad on 15 April 1982.

== Relatives ==
Islambouli's younger brother Mohammed al-Islambouli came close to assassinating the Egyptian president and Sadat's successor Hosni Mubarak on 22 June 1995 on the way from Addis Ababa International Airport to an African summit in the city. Showqi and his associates opened fire on the armour-plated limousine destroying most of the escort vehicles. However, Mubarak was saved by his chauffeur, who U-turned the damaged limousine and raced back to the airport where the presidential plane was waiting with running engines.

== Legacy ==
Iran long celebrated Islambouli as a "martyr", fueling decades of tension with Egypt. In 1982, Iran issued a stamp in Islambouli's honor, showing him shouting defiantly from behind bars. In addition, Iran named a street after him in Tehran. The Tehran City Council renamed the street to "Intifada" in 2004 to improve relations with Egypt. In 2025, Tehran renamed Khaled Al-Islambouli Street to Hassan Nasrallah Street after the Hezbollah leader's assassination by Israel. The renaming was seen as an important symbolic step toward normalization.

On 31 July 2004, "The al-Islambouli Brigades of al-Qaeda" claimed responsibility for an assassination attempt on Shaukat Aziz, then a candidate for the post of Prime Minister of Pakistan. On 24 August 2004, a Chechen group calling itself "The al Islambouli Brigades" issued a statement claiming responsibility for the bombing of two Russian passenger aircraft in 2004.

In 2012, Islambouli's mother, Qadriya, who lived in Afghanistan before returning to Egypt through Iran, mentioned in an interview with Iran's state-run Fars News Agency that she was proud of her son who killed Anwar Al-Sadat, as he was defending Islam.
