= Galal Amer =

Egyptian journalist

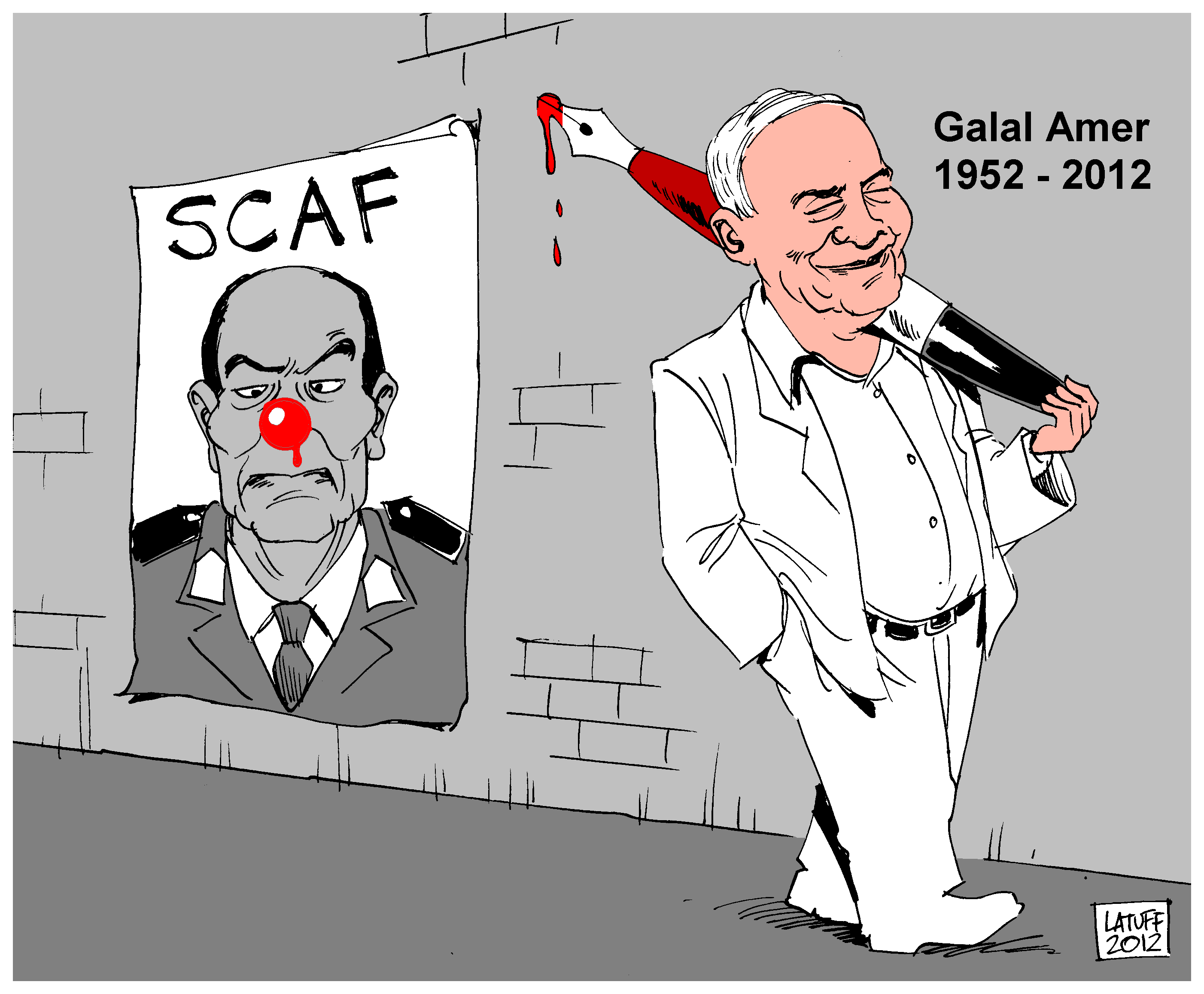
- Galal Amer by Carlos Latuff
- Born: 23 July 1952; Alexandria, Egypt
- Died: 12 February 2012 (aged 59); Alexandria, Egypt
- Occupation: Writer/journalist
- Children: 4
- Writing career
- Notable works: Masr Ala Kaf Afreet; Estkalet Raees Araby

Galal Amer (Arabic: جلال عامر; 23 July 1952 – 12 February 2012) was an Egyptian journalist, well known for his sarcasm and sense of humor. He graduated from Egyptian Military Academy, and fought in several wars, such as the War of Attrition and October War. He is an inspiration for many Arabian sarcastic journalists. After his death, a street was named in honour of him in his hometown of Alexandria.

== Journalism and publications ==
Galal Amer studied law and philosophy, and used to write short stories and poems, some of which got published. He started as a journalist in Al-Kahera newspaper, and then his articles were published by several newspapers, and he wrote a daily article in Al-masry Al-youm newspaper called "Takhareef", then he started to use the social networks to publish his articles and views, and got followed by hundreds of thousands of admirers.

He wrote Masr Ala Kaf Afreet, which got published in 2009; it discusses Egypt's biggest problems in a humorous way, and the average Egyptian's troubled life. Another of his well-known books is Estkalet Raees Araby, which got published in 2010.

== Revolution ==
After the start of the Egyptian Revolution of 2011, Galal Amer was one of the people that opposed Hosni Mubarak and Supreme Council of the Armed Forces, and participated in the demonstration protests that demanded the end of military rule.

== Death ==
On 12 February 2012, Galal Amer had a heart attack while participating in a protest. Newspapers published after his death that the heart attack was caused by the scene of Egyptian protesters getting attacked by thugs.

== Personal life ==
Galal Amer was married and had four children: Ramy, Rania, Ragy, and Reham.
