= Al-Ahram Hebdo =

French-language Egyptian newspaper

Al Ahram Hebdo

- Al-Ahram Hebdo print edition on April–May 2022
- Type: Weekly newspaper
- Publisher: Al Ahram publishing house
- Editor-in-chief: Fouad Mansour
- News editor: Chérif Soliman
- Founded: 1994; 32 years ago
- Language: French
- Headquarters: Cairo
- ISSN: 1110-5062
- OCLC number: 32526243
- Website: Al-Ahram Hebdo

Al-Ahram Hebdo is a French-language weekly newspaper in Egypt. In addition to their print and online editions, the newspaper runs Ahraminfo, which provides daily news updates.

== History and profile ==
Al Ahram Hebdo was established in 1994 by the Al Ahram publishing house which also owns Al-Ahram newspaper, an English-language version, and Al Ahram Weekly. The paper which is published weekly is based in Cairo.

Egyptian writer Mohamed Salmawy was the first of Al-Ahram Hebdo editors-in-chief. Hisham Mourad also served as editor-in-chief. He was appointed to the post in January 2011. In June 2014, Fouad Mansour who was the managing editor of the magazine since 2003, was appointed editor-in-chief of the weekly. Fouad Mansour co-founded Ahram Online, Egypt biggest English language news website, with veteran Egyptian journalist and writer Hani Shukrallah in 2010.

Dina Abdel Mooti Darwich, an Egyptian journalist who won the first Samir Kassir Prize in 2006 for an article written in Al-Ahram Hebdo, is among the founding team of the weekly.

In 2023, the newspaper launched the daily digital news service Ahraminfo, to complement the print edition and website.

== See also ==
- List of newspapers in Egypt
