= Masrawy =

Egyptian news portal

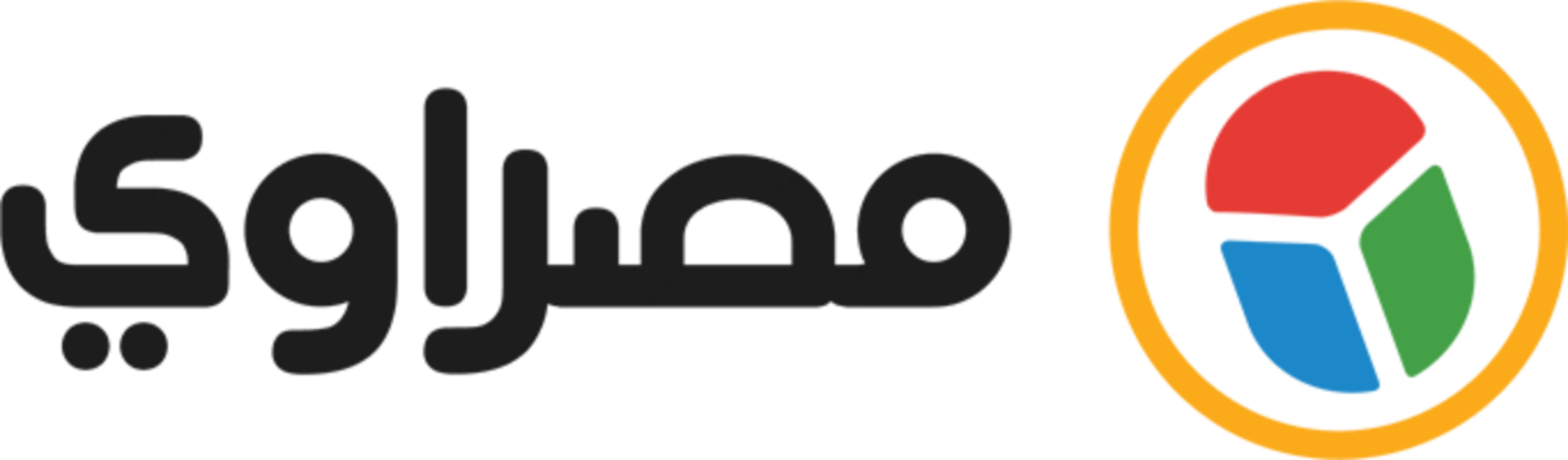
- Website type: news website
- Available in: Arabic
- Owner: LinkOnLine
- Website: Masrawy
- Commercial: Yes
- Registration: Optional
- Launched: 1999; 27 years ago

Masrawy (Arabic: مصراوي) is an Arabic Egyptian news website. It operates under the ONA institution for press and media which owns YallaKora, ONA and Elconsolto websites and Gemini media company.

It presents Arabic-language news, commentary, and lifestyle articles directed at the Middle East and wider Arabic-speaking community. It is online-only and presents news across multiple social media platforms.

Magdy ElGalad is the editor-in-chief.

== Services ==
=== News ===
Masrawy covers wide range of news including political, economical, artistic and technology related news.

=== Classifieds ===
Masrawy also provides the largest Arabic video directory, and the largest classifieds channel in Egypt. Also, Masrawy users can deliver their thoughts and voice over Masrawy through dedicated channels for user's news and articles, Ketabat and Moraselon channels.

=== Women ===
This covers issues as beauty, fashion, cooking, health, jewelry, maternity and kids.

=== Entertainment ===
Entertainment channel, Masrawy jokes, is one of the most viewed channels on Masrawy providing a corner for fun and entertainment including jokes, funny stories, optics and other sections. Plus, Masrawy provides a channel for games providing a wide variety of single and multiplayer games.

=== Bulk SMS ===
Providing Bulk SMS services for SMEs.

== Audience ==
Masrawy was the first most visited website in the Arab world in 2012 and in 2014.

== See also ==
- Yahoo! Maktoob
- List of newspapers in Egypt
