= Le Progrès Egyptien =

Le Progrès Egyptien (French pronunciation: [lə pʁɔɡʁɛ eʒipsjɛ̃]) is a French-language Egyptian daily newspaper.

== History and profile ==
Le Progrès Egyptien was established in 1893. It is owned by Al Gomhuria, a pro-government newspaper in Egypt. The paper is based in Cairo and the publisher is Dar Al Tahrir Publishing and Printing company.
