= Parvaresh (newspaper) =

Persian language newspaper in Cairo, Egypt (1900–1902)

- Type: Weekly newspaper
- Founder(s): Mirza Ali Mohammad Khan Kashani
- Founded: 8 June 1900
- Political alignment: Secular; progressive
- Language: Persian
- Ceased publication: November 1902
- Headquarters: Cairo
- Country: Egypt

Parvaresh (Persian: Education) was one of the Persian publications published in Cairo, Egypt. The paper was in circulation from 1900 to 1902. It was among the Persian publications abroad that contributed to the political awakening of Iranians.

== History and profile ==
Parvaresh was established by Mirza Ali Mohammad Khan Kashani in Cairo in 1900, with the first issue appearing on 8 June that year. Kashani had previously launched another Persian newspaper in Cairo titled Sorayya. However, after a dispute with Sorayya's other editor, Farajallah Hosayni Kashani he left that publication and started Parvaresh, which was also published weekly like Sorayya. Parvaresh ceased publication in November 1902 following the death of its founder, Mirza Ali Mohammad Khan Kashani.

== Political stance and content ==
Parvaresh was highly progressive and frequently featured articles about women in Iranian society. The paper argued that many talented and creative Iranian women, particularly in the field of literature, deserved recognition. It also stated that the status of Iranian women under the Qajar rule was unacceptable, as they were often regarded as lacking basic human attributes.
