= Sorayya (newspaper) =

Persian language newspaper in Cairo, Egypt(1898–1900)

- Type: Weekly newspaper
- Founder(s): Mirza Ali Mohammad Khan Kashani; Sayyid Farajullah Kashani
- Editor-in-chief: Mirza Ali Mohammad Khan Kashani
- Founded: 31 October 1898
- Political alignment: Secular
- Language: Persian
- Ceased publication: 3 November 1900
- Headquarters: Cairo
- Country: Egypt

Sorayya (Persian: The Pleiades) was one of the Persian publications which were published in Cairo, Egypt. The paper was the second Persian newspaper published there and was in circulation between 1898 and 1900. It was among the Persian publications published abroad which contributed to the political awakening of Iranians.

== History and profile ==
The first issue of Sorayya appeared on 31 October 1898. Its founders were Mirza Ali Mohammad Khan Kashani and Sayyid Farajullah Kashani. The former also edited the paper. It was published on a weekly basis and had a secular and liberal approach. It frequently attacked Naser al-Din Shah Qajar's Prime Minister, Amin al-Soltan, known as Atabak. Partly due to its critical approach circulation of Sorayya was banned by the Qajar authorities in Iran. The paper was very popular and influential among the mullahs who were training in Najaf, Iraq.

Due to the conflicts between Kaskani and another editor Farajallah Hosayni Kashani the former left Sorayya and established another Persian publication, Parvaresh in 1900. Sorayya folded after the publication of the issue dated 3 November 1900.
