= Ash-Shams (Egyptian newspaper) =

Weekly Jewish newspaper in Egypt (1934–1948)

- Type: Weekly newspaper
- Editor: Saad Malki
- Founded: 1934
- Ceased publication: May 1948
- Political alignment: Egyptian nationalism Zionism
- Language: Arabic
- Country: Egypt

Ash-Shams (Arabic: الشمس, 'The Sun') was an Arabic-language Jewish weekly newspaper in Egypt. The paper was established in 1934. The editor of ash-Shams was Saad Malki whose political outlook combined Egyptian nationalism with moderate Zionism. The weekly was closed down by the Egyptian government in May 1948.

== See also ==
- History of the Jews in Egypt
