= Daily News Egypt =

Egyptian daily newspaper

- The Daily News Egypt Logo
- Type: Daily newspaper
- Format: Broadsheet
- Publisher: Egyptian Media Services (May 2005–21 April 2012); Business News for Press, Publishing and Distribution Company (from June 2012)
- Founded: 1 May 2005; 21 years ago
- Headquarters: Dokki, Giza, Egypt
- Circulation: 10,000–40,000
- Website: www.dailynewsegypt.com

Daily News Egypt (DNE) is an English-language daily Egyptian newspaper established in 2005 and relaunched in June 2012. Under former owner Egyptian Media Services, it was distributed with the International Herald Tribune as a supplement. According to its website, the paper carries "business, political and cultural news and analysis". The newspaper has claimed to be independent and not subject to government censorship.

== History ==
Egyptian Media Services closed Daily News Egypt after publishing the 20–21 April 2012 issue. All content was produced by an Egyptian editorial team. Rania Al Malky was the last editor-in-chief of DNE, a position she has held since May 2007 after being promoted from the position of deputy editor she held when she joined the team in December 2006. She succeeded Firas Al Atraqchi, who was editor from October 2006 to April 2007 and who had joined following the departure of the first editor Amr Gamal, who held the position from August 2005 to October 2006. Last deputy editor was Sarah El Sirgany, business editor Amira Ahmed, features editor Dalia Rabie, arts and culture editor Joseph Fahim and lifestyle editor Heba Elkayal. The paper included contributions by a large network of freelancers based in Cairo.

On 18 May 2012, Business News for Press, Publishing and Distribution Company announced it would begin publishing a newspaper under the name Daily News Egypt in June 2012. The newspaper was relaunched on 19 June 2012, and the web edition on 22 June 2012. Business News for Press also publishes the financial newspaper Al Borsa and is affiliated with the training company Capital Markets Institute. The current CEO is Saad Zaghloul.
