= Al Ahali =

Egyptian daily newspaper

- Type: Daily newspaper
- Owner: National Progressive Unionist Rally Party
- Founder: Khalid Mohieddin
- Founded: 1 February 1978; 48 years ago
- Political alignment: Leftist
- Language: Arabic
- Headquarters: Cairo
- Country: Egypt
- Website: Al Ahali

Newspaper logo

Al Ahali, also known as Al Ahaly, (Arabic: الأهالي, romanized: al-Ahālī, lit. 'The Masses') is an Arabic daily newspaper published in Cairo, Egypt. The paper has been in circulation since 1978 and is the official media outlet of the National Progressive Unionist Rally Party

== History and profile ==
Al Ahali was first published in February 1978. It is the organ of the National Progressive Unionist Rally Party which is also the publisher of the daily. The founder of both the paper and the party was Khalid Mohieddin. Dilip Hiro who is an expert on Middle Eastern, Islamic, and central Asian affairs argues that Al Ahali is much more popular than the National Progressive Unionist Rally Party. The paper was temporarily closed by the Egyptian government six months after its establishment due to its coverage of the party's success and popularity.

Shortly after its start the circulation of Al Ahali was 150,000 copies. The paper sold nearly 100,000 copies in 1989.

== Political stance and bans ==
Al Ahali has a leftist stance and was the major critic of the Sadat rule. Immediately after its start the paper was temporarily shut down by the Egyptian government. In addition, it came across numerous bans, and its offices were attacked by the Egyptian forces during the Sadat rule. Its critical approach continued during the rule of Hosni Mubarak, Sadat's successor.

== Content and contributors ==
Al Ahali was critical of Iranian ruler Shah Mohammad Reza Pahlavi. The paper was the sole Egyptian publication which correctly interpreted the mass demonstrations in Iran in 1978 predicting that these demonstrations were the forerunner of the revolution. In addition, it was the first Egyptian newspaper which published an interview with Ayatollah Khomenei before the revolution in 1979. The daily was among twelve newspapers which protested the Islamist-drawn constitution in December 2012.

Rifaat El Saeed, chairman of the National Progressive Unionist Rally Party, published many articles in the paper which mostly included criticisms over the violation of the rights of the Copts in Egypt. Mahmud Al Muraghi is one of the former editors-in-chief of the daily who resigned from the post on 25 October 1989. Farida Nakash also served in the post, being the first female editor-in-chief of Al Ahali.

Amin Howeidi, former minister of war and director of general intelligence, published articles in the paper.
