= Hekmat =

Former Persian-language newspaper in Egypt

- Type: Newspaper
- Owner: Mohammad-Mahdi Tabrizi
- Publisher: Mohammad-Mahdi Tabrizi
- Editor: Mohammad-Mahdi Tabrizi
- Founded: 20 September 1892
- Ceased publication: 30 May 1911
- Language: Persian
- Headquarters: Cairo
- Circulation: Unknown

Hekmat (Persian: حكمت, lit. 'Wisdom') was the first Persian-language newspaper published in Egypt, and the first Persian journal published in an Arab country. Founded and managed by the Iranian expatriate Mohammad-Mahdi Tabrizi (died 1914), a physician by profession, it was published from 20 September 1892 until 30 May 1911. (Note: Tabrizi was also an author and poet.) Hekmat carried primarily news, but also featured a variety of articles on political and social issues. Despite being published in an Arab country, it avoided using Arabic terms and Arabic forms of non-Arab words in its content.

With prose described as being "among the best of its time", Hekmat was known to be supportive of introducing modern science into Iran, and was a defender of Shia Islam in the country. It was, however, critical of Christian missionary activity as well as of Russian, British and Ottoman interference in Iranian politics, Hekmat helped pave the way for the Iranian Constitutional Revolution (1905-1911) and, during the Constitutional era, unconditionally supported the Constitutionalists and staunchly defended the press in Iran.

== Circulation and format ==
For the first eight years of its circulation, it was published weekly. This was later reduced to three publications per month for the following five years. In the final six years, it was published every two weeks.

Tabrizi received some support from the Iranian consul in Cairo, but he worked alone on the paper. This resulted in several interruptions, one of them being in 1898-1902 due to illness, but later also due to his travels and a change in printing house. From 1895, the newspaper was distributed from a printing house that Tabrizi himself owned.

The first issue of Hekmat was four pages long, but all subsequent issues, for the next seven years, were of eight pages and had a 47 x 34 cm format with "three columns of text". In the eighth year of publication, its format changed to 19 x 27.5 cm and the number of pages increased from eight to sixteen. The number of columns of text decreased to two, but it began to include an "occasional illustration". In the thirteenth year of publication, the newspaper called itself a majalleh (magazine). Of the various Persian-language newspapers that were published in Egypt, Hekmat distinguished itself by paying particular attention to "cultural developments" in Egypt. In the first three years of publication, some issues of Hekmat also featured contemporary Arabic poetry, as well as Persian translations of works by Egyptian writers.

== Subscription ==
Subscription costs in Iran were twenty-five qerāns per year, in the first three years of publication. In the fourth year, this was increased to forty qerāns. At one point, during the early years of publication, the price was raised to fifty, but this was reduced relatively quickly due to subscriber dissatisfaction. Outside of Iran, the subscription costs were ten rubles per year in Russia, twenty Francs in the Ottoman Empire, ten rupees in British India, and twenty-five Francs "elsewhere". In the final years of publication, the subscription costs of Hekmat were one pound sterling in Egypt, Europe, the United States and China, while in British India it became fifteen rupees. Hekmat was "not prices for single copies", and it published "very few advertisements".

Though little information is available concerning its press run, the existence of the paper in an extensive number of private libraries show that Hekmat was widely read. Outside of Iran, incomplete collections are kept in the libraries of the University of Cambridge and the Princeton University.

== Sources ==
- Parvin, Nasseredin (2003). "ḤEKMAT". In Yarshater, Ehsan (ed.). Encyclopædia Iranica. Vol. XII/2: Hedāyat al-mota'allemin–Herat VII. London and New York: Routledge & Kegan Paul. pp. 144–145. ISBN 978-0-933273-75-7.
- Parvin, Nasseredin (2009). "EGYPT xi. Persian Journalism in Egypt". In Yarshater, Ehsan (ed.). Encyclopædia Iranica (Online ed.). Encyclopædia Iranica Foundation.
