= Al Gomhuria =

Egyptian newspaper

Al Gomhuria الجمهورية

- Al-Gomhuria - جريدة الجمهورية Cover Page
- Type: Daily
- Format: Broadsheet
- Publisher: Dar Al-Tahrir Publishing House
- Editor: Ahmed Ayoub
- Founded: 1954; 72 years ago
- Headquarters: Ramsees, Cairo, Egypt
- Website: Al-Gomhuria - جريدة الجمهورية

Al Gomhuria (Arabic: الجمهورية; English: The Republic) is an influential Egyptian state-owned daily newspaper.

== History and profile ==
Al Gomhuria was established in 1954 following the Egyptian revolution and became the new regime's leading media outlet. The paper was published using the facilities of Wafd party's newspaper Al Misri, which had been banned and forced to shut down by the regime. Anwar Sadat became the editor of the daily. The publisher of the paper is Dar Al Tahrir which was founded following the 1952 revolution. However, Al Gomhuria could not completely achieve the goals set by Gamal Abdel Nasser.

The circulation of the daily in 2000 was 400,000 copies.

Samir Ragab served as the chairman of the board and the editor in chief of the daily. In August 2012, Gamal Abdel Rahim was appointed editor-in-chief of the paper by the Egyptian Shura Council. However, he was fired in October 2012 and Al Sayed Al Bably was named as the editor-in-chief in November.

Dar Al Tahrir publishing house also owns the following:

- Al Ray Lel Shaab (weekly newspaper)
- Al Messa (evening newspaper)
- Al Kora wal Malaeb (sports)
- Shashaty (entertainment)
- Aqidaty (Islamic)

The group also publishes:

- Egyptian Gazette (English)
- Le Progrès Egyptien (French)

== Notable editors ==
- Siham Bayyumi
- Ebrahim Nafae
- Anwar Sadat (1955–1956)
- Mahmoud Salem

== See also ==
- List of newspapers in Egypt
