= National Assembly of the United Arab Republic (1960–1961) =

Legislature of the United Arab Republic from 1960 to 1961

National Assembly
←	1st NA (Egypt); 6th (Syria)	1st NA (UAR); CPA (Syria)	→

Overview
- Legislative body: National Assembly
- Jurisdiction: United Arab Republic
- Meeting place: Cairo
- Term: 21 July 1960 – 22 June 1961
- Election: Appointed by the President
- Government: Abdel Nasser IV (until 7 October 1958); Abdel Nasser V (from 7 October 1958)
- Members: 600
- Speaker: Anwar Sadat (National Union)

Sessions
- 1st: 21 July – 15 November 1960
- 2nd: 9 January – 8 February 1961
- 3rd: 11 April – 22 June 1961

The National Assembly of the United Arab Republic (Arabic: مجلس الأمة للجمهورية العربية المتحدة) was the unicameral legislative body of the United Arab Republic, the political union between Egypt and Syria that existed from 1958 to 1961. Established under the 1958 provisional constitution, the Assembly functioned as the central legislative authority of the unified state, though its powers were limited by the dominant role of the presidency.

== Background ==
The creation of the National Assembly followed the political union between Syria and Egypt under the leadership of Gamal Abdel Nasser and Shukri al-Quwatli. On 29 January 1958, the Parliaments of both countries unanimously approved the union. On 1 February 1958, both governments signed the agreement establishing the union. A referendum held on 21 February 1958 in both of Egypt and Syria overwhelmingly approved both the union and Nasser's presidency. The United Arab Republic was officially proclaimed on 22 February 1958.

The union merged the two states into a single political entity with a unified executive, military, and legislature.

== Constitutional framework ==
On 5 March 1958, Nasser promulgated a provisional constitution consisting of 73 articles. The constitution established a presidential system with extensive executive powers, concentrated legislative authority in the National Assembly., and restricted political activity.

Under the constitution, members of the Assembly were appointed by the President. The President held the power to convene and dissolve the Assembly. The National Assembly was formally vested with legislative authority, including the power to enact laws, approve the state budget, levy taxes, oversee the executive branch. In practice, however, its role was limited by the dominant authority of the presidency.

Although the constitution was issued in 1958, the Assembly was not convened until 21 July 1960, when President Gamal Abdel Nasser formally called it into session.

== Bureau ==
Position	Name	Party	Tenure
Speaker	Anwar Sadat	National Union	21 July 1960 – 22 June 1961
Deputy Speaker	Muhammad Fuad Jalal		21 July 1960 – 22 June 1961
Deputy Speaker	Ratib al-Husami		21 July 1960 – 22 June 1961
Secretary	Jawda Karakshe		21 July 1960 – 22 June 1961
Secretary	Mar'i Khayrat		21 July 1960 – 22 June 1961
Secretary	Taha Haddad		21 July 1960 – 22 June 1961
Secretary	Shakir al-Dorubi		21 July 1960 – 22 June 1961
Secretary	Muhammad Hamid Mahmud		21 July 1960 – 22 June 1961
Secretary	Zaki Abd al-Hadi		21 July 1960 – 22 June 1961
Secretary	Abd al-Mun'im Tahir		21 July 1960 – 22 June 1961
Secretary	Mazhar al-Sharbaji		21 July 1960 – 22 June 1961

== Members ==
The National Assembly consisted of 600 members; 400 members representing the Southern Region (Egypt), and 200 members representing the Northern Region (Syria). The seats were distributed among the governorates as follows:

Southern Region (Egypt)
Governorate	No. of seats	Governorate	No. of seats
Alexandria	21	Aswan	9
Asyut	22	Beheira	25
Beni Suef	15	Cairo	44
Dakahlia	30	Damietta	6
Faiyum	15	Gharbia	27
Giza	15	Ismailia	4
Kafr El Sheikh	18	Minya	23
Monufia	23	Port Said	5
Qalyubiya	13	Qena	23
Red Sea	2	Sharqia	25
Sinai	2	Sohag	28
Southern Desert	1	Suez	3
Western Desert	1		
Northern Region (Syria)
Governorate	No. of seats	Governorate	No. of seats
Aleppo	43	Damascus	42
Daraa	8	Deir ez-Zor	13
Hama	15	Hasakah	14
Homs	20	Idlib	12
Latakia	22	Rashid	4
Sweida	7		

At least half of the members were drawn from the former Syrian and Egyptian parliaments. The Assembly also included the first female parliamentary representatives from Syria.

== Dissolution ==
The National Assembly was dissolved on 22 June 1961. On 28 September 1961, a military coup in Syria effectively dissolved the union. Egypt remained to be called the United Arab Republic until 1971. A new 350-member National Assembly was elected in 1964.
