= Arab Socialist Union (Egypt) =

Egyptian political party

Arab Socialist Union الاتحاد الاشتراكى العربى
- Chairperson: Gamal Abdel Nasser (1962–1970); Anwar Sadat (1970–1978)
- General Secretary: Gamal Abdel Nasser (1962–1965); Ali Sabri (1962–1971); Anwar Sadat (1971–1978)
- Founded: 1962 (Note: Announced in the National Charter on 21 May 1962, and launched on 4 July. The party's supreme executive committee was formed on 29 October, while the basic law was not enacted until 8 December. Membership enrolment began at the start of 1963.)
- Dissolved: 2 October 1978
- Preceded by: National Union
- Succeeded by: National Democratic Party (majority); Egypt Arab Socialist Party (minority); Liberal Socialists Party (minority); National Progressive Unionist Rally Party (minority)
- Headquarters: Cairo, Egypt
- Youth wing: UAR Socialist Youth Organization
- Ideology: 1962–1970: Nasserism; 1970–1978: Infitah
- Political position: 1962–1970: Left-wing; 1970–1978: Big tent
- Union parties: Egypt Arab Socialist Organization (1976–1978); Liberal Socialist Organization (1976–1978); National Progressive Unionist Rally Organization (1976–1978)
- Affiliated parties: Iraqi Arab Socialist Union (1964–1968); Libyan Arab Socialist Union (1971–1977)
- Colors: Red; White; Black
- Slogan: Freedom, Socialism, Unity. حرية، اشتراكية، وحدة

The Arab Socialist Union (Egyptian Arabic: الاتحاد الاشتراكى العربى al-Ittiḥād al-Ištirākī al-ʿArabī) was an Egyptian political party. Founded in 1962, it was based on the principles of Nasserism and Arab socialism. It evolved during the years of Sadat to become the National Democratic Party, which ruled Egypt until the 2011 Egyptian revolution.

== History ==
=== Foundation ===
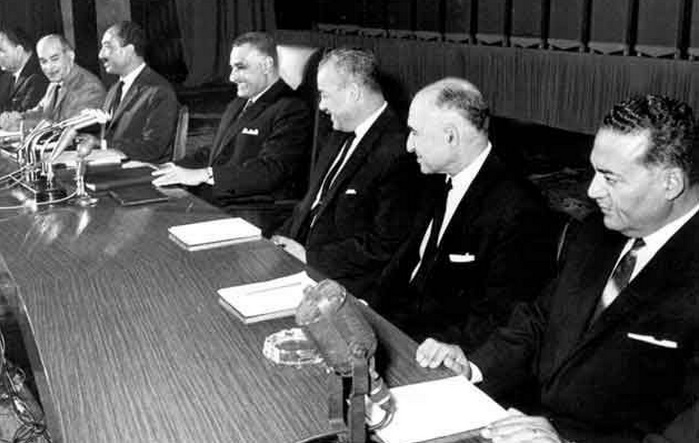
The Executive Committee of the ASU at a party conference, March 1969. From right to left: Diaa al-Din Dawoud, Mahmoud Fawzi, Hussein el-Shafei, Gamal Abdel Nasser, Anwar Sadat, Ali Sabri and Labib Shukair.

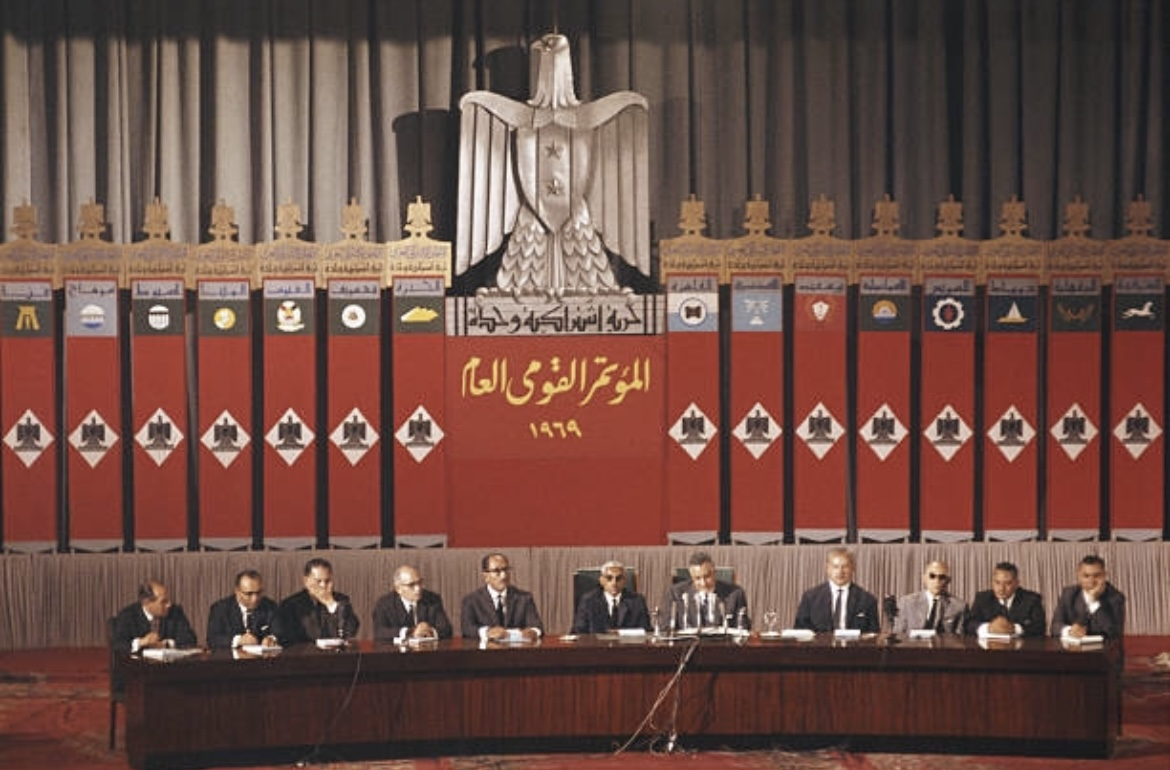
Arab Socialist Union's national assembly in 1969

The Arab Socialist Union (ASU) was founded in 1962 by Gamal Abdel Nasser as the country's sole political party. The ASU grew out of the Free Officers Movement of the Egyptian Revolution of 1952. The party's formation was just one part in Nasser's National Charter. The Charter set out an agenda of nationalization, agrarian reform, and constitutional reform, which formed the basis of ASU policy. The programme of nationalisation under Nasser saw E£7 billion worth of private assets transferred into the public sector. Private insurance companies, banks, many large shipping companies, major heavy and basic industries were converted to public control. Land reforms saw the maximum area of private land ownership successively reduced from 200 to 100 feddans. A 90% top rate of income tax was levied on income over E£10,000. Boards of directors were required to have a minimum number of workers, and workers and peasants were guaranteed at least half of the seats in the People's Assembly. The Charter also saw a strong assertion of Arab nationalism, within the context of historical Egyptian nationalism.

In September 1963 a secret unit of the ASU was established which was called the Vanguard Organization. It was headed by Sharawi Gomaa and Sami Sharaf. Following the defeat in the Six-Day War in 1967 Nasser reorganized the ASU, closing its youth branch and executive bureau. He became the head of its national congress and central committee.

=== Under Sadat and demise ===
After Nasser's death in 1970, Anwar Sadat quickly moved away from his radical socialist position. This was demonstrated clearly in 1974, with Sadat's Infitah, or Open Door, economic policy, which allowed the emergence of a modern entrepreneurial and consumerist society. Then, in 1976, the beginning of political pluralism allowed three political platforms — left, centre and right — to form within the Arab Socialist Union. In 1978, the platforms were allowed to become fully independent political parties, and the ASU was disbanded. Many of today's political parties in Egypt have their origin in the breakup of the ASU.

Following the Six-Day War and massive demonstrations in February and October 1969, Egypt was in a state of political turmoil, leading to raising calls for granting citizens more democratic rights and demanding self-expression for political affiliations.

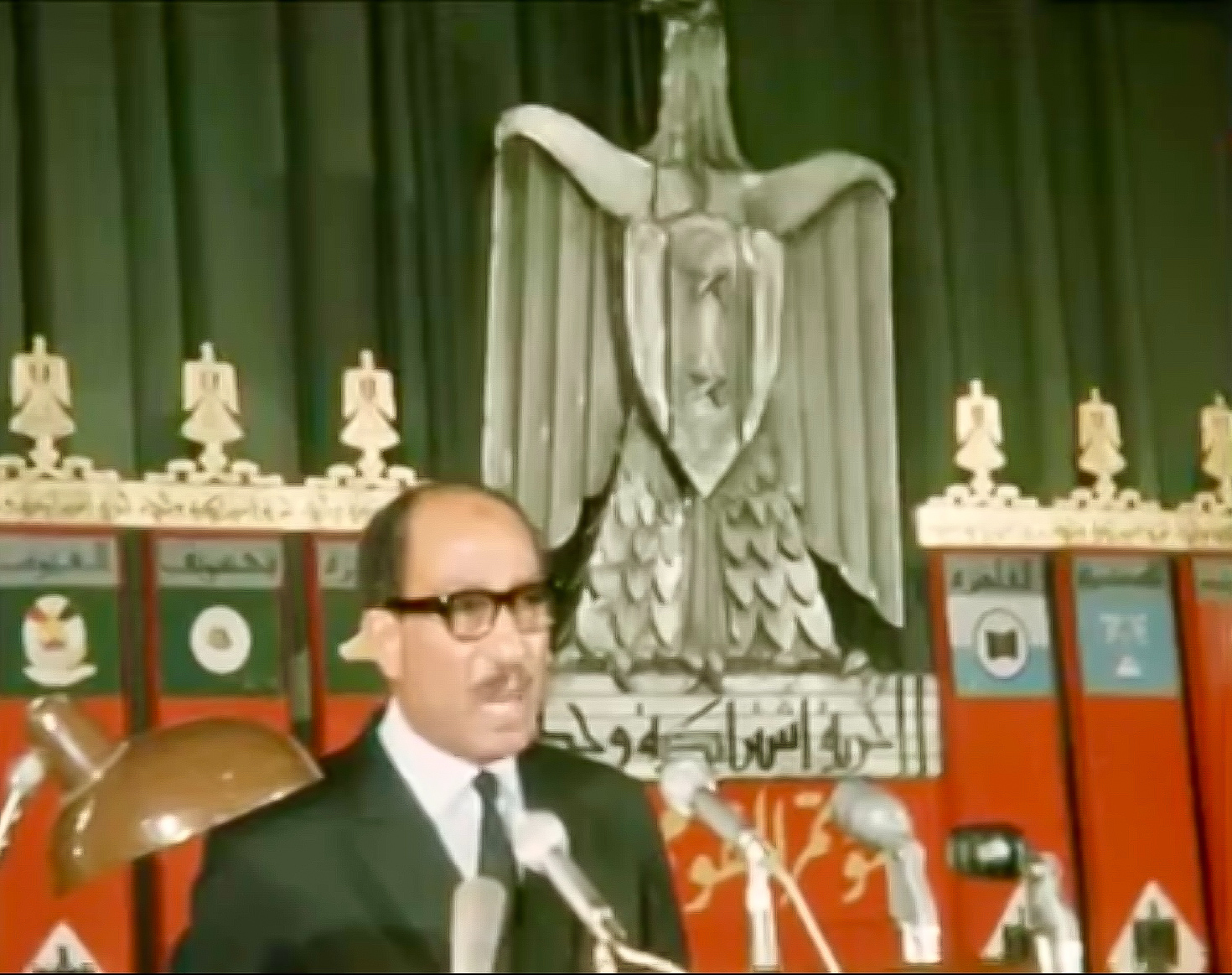
Anwar Sadat addressing the members of the Arab Socialist Union in 1971

Following assuming office in 1970, late president Anwar Sadat adopted the slogans of rule of law and the institutional state. In August 1974, Sadat put forward a working paper to revamp the Arab Socialist Union. In July 1975, the Arab Socialist Union's general conference adopted a resolution on establishing political forums within the union for expression of opinion in accordance with basic principles of the Egyptian Revolution. In March 1976, president Sadat issued a decree allowing three forums to represent the right wing (the Liberal Socialist Organization), the center wing (Egypt Arab Socialist Organization) and the left wing (the National Progressive Unionist Organization).

These forums were later transformed into parties, forming today's Egyptian major political parties. During the first meeting of the People's Assembly on 22 November 1976, president Sadat declared the three political organizations turned into parties.

In June 1977, the law of political party was enacted, allowed the existence of several political parties and demonstrated the shift to a multi-party system. However the ratification of this law had not meant cancellation of the Arab Socialist Union, rather it had given the Union more powers to allow party formation.

The centre wing of the ASU evolved into the National Democratic Party, which was the nation's dominant (and de facto only) party until the Egyptian Revolution of 2011. The left wing became the National Progressive Unionist Party, which remains a player on the Left of Egyptian political spectrum, while the right wing became the Liberal Socialists Party which survives as a less significant player on the scene.

== Ideology and internal factions ==
The Arab Socialist Union goals at that point reflected the following:

- There should be state control over the national economy and the public sector should establish institutions to undertake the development process.
- Arab nationalism and pan-Arabism should be pursued.
- Commitment to the development of Arab socialism
- The state should be answerable to the people and run as a democracy.
- Commitment to religion and freedom of faith and worship are essential.

The ASU's nature (a big tent populist party) permitted the formation of three factions in 1970s that represented the various souls within the party, namely the rightist Liberal Socialist Organization (economic and Islamic liberal); the centrist Arab Socialist Organization (Islamic socialist) and the leftist Tagammu Organization (progressive, populist and nationalist).

== Electoral history ==
=== Presidential elections ===
Election	Party candidate	Votes	%	Result
1956(referendum)	Gamal Abdel Nasser	5,499,555	100%	Elected ✓
1958(referendum)	Gamal Abdel Nasser	6,102,128	100%	Elected ✓
1965(referendum)	Gamal Abdel Nasser	6,950,098	100%	Elected ✓
1970(referendum)	Anwar Sadat	6,432,587	90%	Elected ✓
1976(referendum)	Anwar Sadat	9,145,683	99.94%	Elected ✓

=== People's Assembly of Egypt elections ===
Election	Party leader	Votes	%	Seats	+/–	Position	Result
1964	Ali Sabri		100%	350 / 360	▲350	▲1st	Sole legal party
1969	Gamal Abdel Nasser	6,368,511	100%	350 / 360	Steady	1st	Sole legal party
1971	Anwar Sadat		100%	350 / 360	Steady	1st	Sole legal party
1976*	Anwar Sadat	3,803,973	100%	313 / 360	▼37	1st	Sole legal party

Notes

During the 1976 election, only the three factions of the ASU ran.

== See also ==
- Arab Socialist Union (Iraq)
- Arab Socialist Union (Libya)
- Arab Socialist Union Party (Syria)
