= 1958 Syrian United Arab Republic referendum =

- 21 February 1958
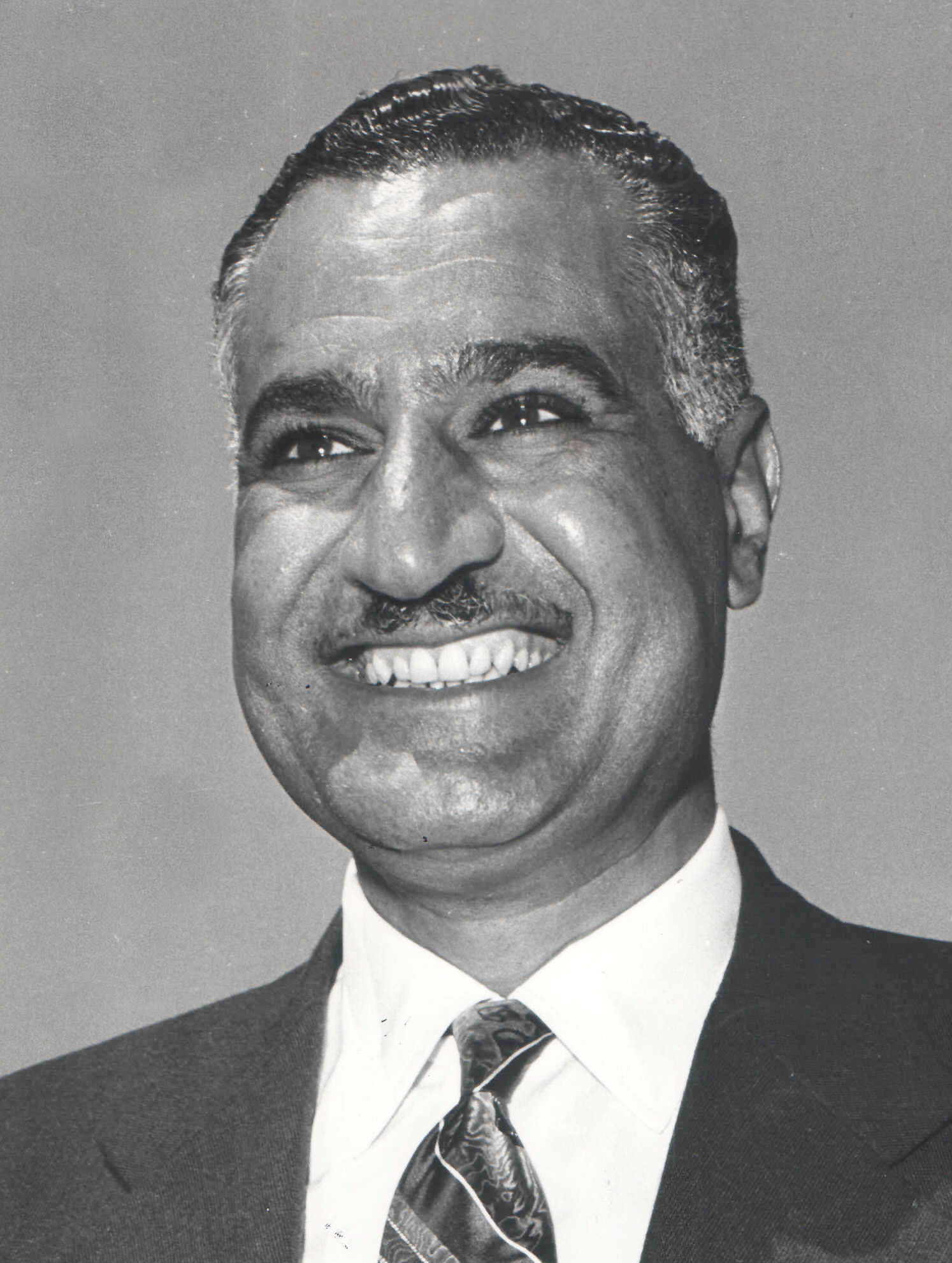
Nominee	Gamal Abdel Nasser
Party	NU
Popular vote	1,312,808
Percentage	99.99%
- Results by constituent state Nasser: 95–100% 100%
President before election
Shukri al-Quwatli
National Party
Elected President
Gamal Abdel Nasser
NU

A referendum on the formation of the United Arab Republic and appointing Gamal Abdel Nasser as its president was held in Syria on 21 February 1958, alongside a simultaneous referendum in Egypt. The formation of the UAR was approved of voters, with only 139 voting against, whilst Nasser was approved as president by a similar margin.

== Results ==
=== Formation of the United Arab Republic ===
Choice	Votes	%
For	1,312,859	99.99
Against	139	0.01
Total	1,312,998	100.00
Registered voters/turnout	1,431,060	–
Source: Direct Democracy

=== Gamal Abdel Nasser as president ===
Choice	Votes	%
For	1,312,808	99.99
Against	190	0.01
Total	1,312,998	100.00
Registered voters/turnout	1,431,060	–
Source: Direct Democracy
