= 1970 United Arab Republic presidential confirmation referendum =

- 15 October 1970
- Registered: 8,420,768
- Turnout: 85.00%
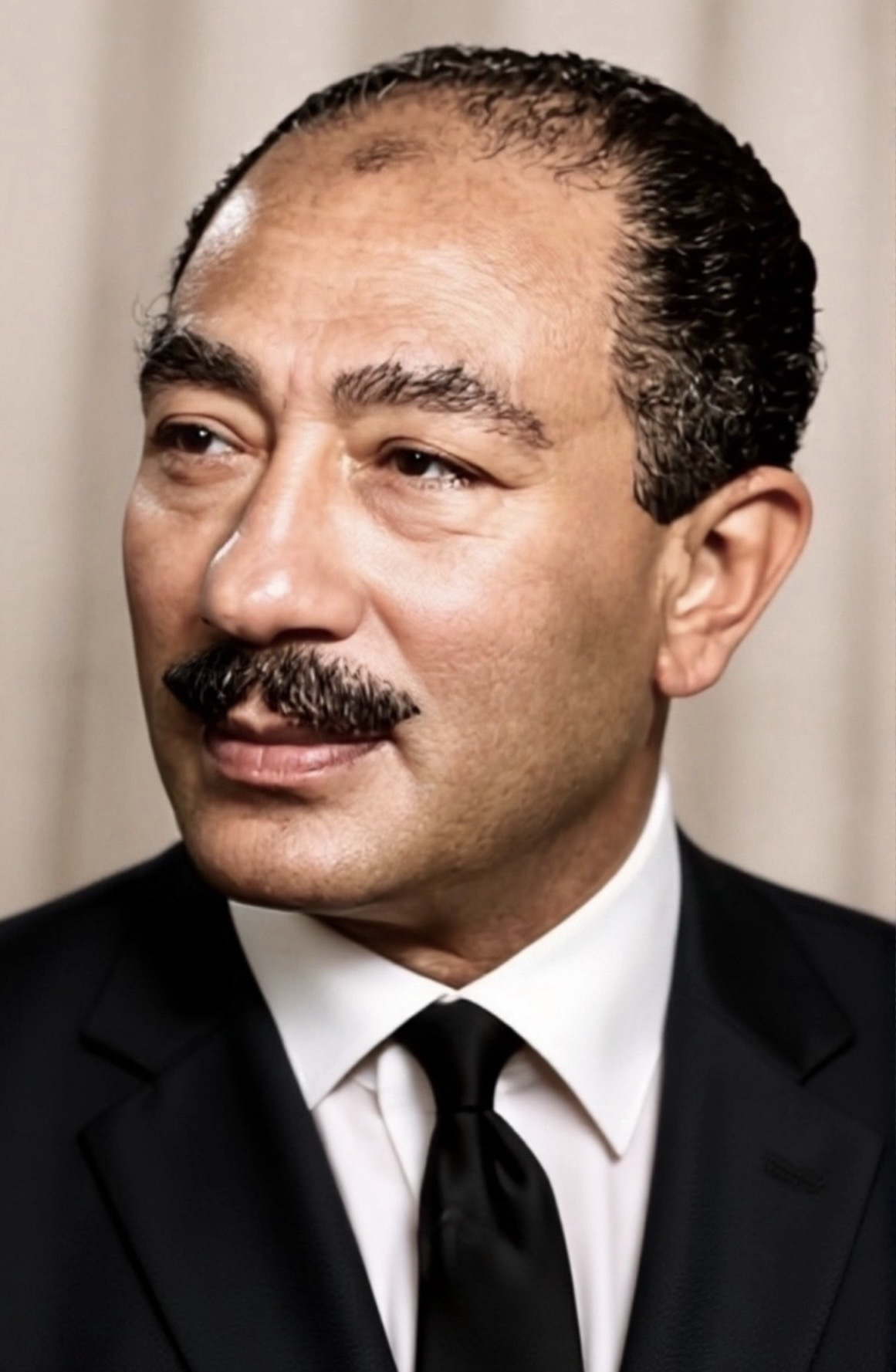
Nominee	Anwar Sadat
Party	ASU
Popular vote	6,432,587
Percentage	90.04%
President before election
Anwar Sadat (acting)
ASU
Elected President
Anwar Sadat
ASU

Presidential elections were held in the United Arab Republic on 15 October 1970, following the death of the incumbent Gamal Abdel Nasser on 28 September of the same year. The election took the form of a referendum on the candidacy of vice president and acting president Anwar El Sadat. According to the official results, 90% of voters voted in favor of Sadat, with a turnout of 85%.

== Results ==
=== Egypt ===
Candidate	Party	Votes	%
Anwar Sadat	Arab Socialist Union	6,432,587	90.04
Against		711,252	9.96
Total		7,143,839	100.00
Valid votes		7,143,839	99.81
Invalid/blank votes		13,814	0.19
Total votes		7,157,653	100.00
Registered voters/turnout		8,420,768	85.00
Source: Nohlen et al.
