= United Arab States =

Confederation in the Middle East (1958–1961)

United Arab States اتحاد الدول العربية
- 1958–1961

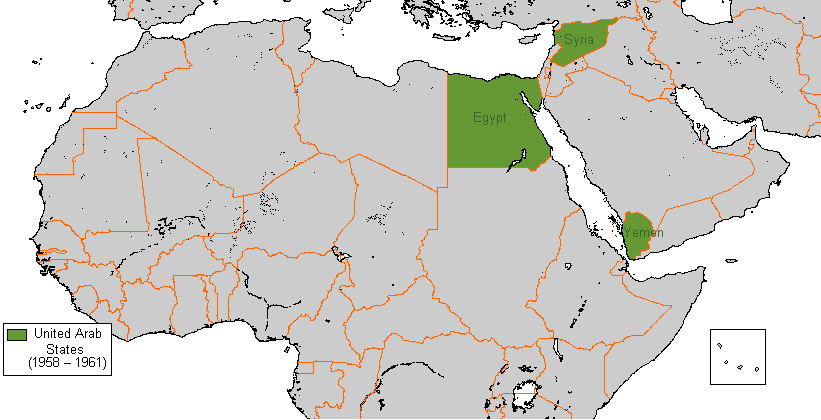
- Capital: Cairo and Sanaa
- Common languages: Arabic
- Religion: Islam
- Historical era: Arab Cold War
  - Established: 8 March 1958
  - Disestablished: 26 December 1961
Preceded by
United Arab Republic
Kingdom of Yemen
Succeeded by
United Arab Republic
Syria
Kingdom of Yemen

The United Arab States (UAS, Arabic: اتحاد الدول العربية) was a short-lived confederation between the United Arab Republic and the Kingdom of Yemen from 1958 to 1961.

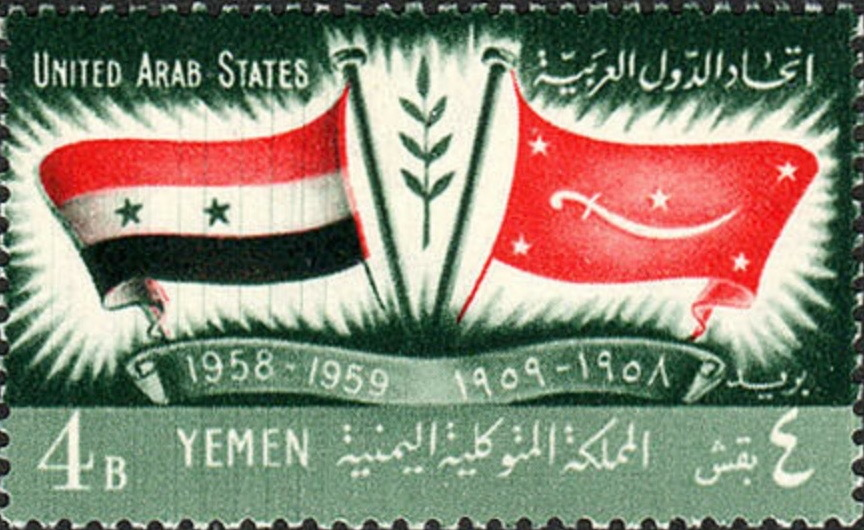
A stamp from the Kingdom of Yemen commemorating the United Arab States

The United Arab Republic was a sovereign state formed by the union of Egypt and Syria in 1958. The same year, the Kingdom of Yemen, which had already signed a defense pact with Egypt, entered a loose confederation with the UAR called the United Arab States on 8 March. One reason for this decision was because North Yemen had felt threatened by its considerably larger and more powerful northern neighbor Saudi Arabia (Note: The two had fought a war in 1934, and still shared a partially undemarcated border) and saw the confederation as a source of security. However, unlike the constituent countries of the United Arab Republic, North Yemen remained an independent sovereign state, maintaining its UN membership and separate embassies throughout the whole period of confederation.

Neither the union nor the confederation fulfilled their role as vehicles of pan-Arabism or Arab nationalism, resulting in its dissolution. The confederation was officially dissolved by Nasser on 26 December 1961.

== See also ==
- Arab League (1972–present), a regional organisation with 22 members.
- Arab Federation, a confederation between Iraq and Jordan (1958)
- United Arab Republic, a union of Egypt and Syria (1958–1961)
- Federation of Arab Republics, a confederation of Egypt, Libya and Syria (1972–1977)
- Union of Arab Republics, a proposed union of Egypt, Iraq and Syria (1972)
- United Arab Kingdom, a proposed federal monarchy between Jordan and Palestine (1972)
- Arab Islamic Republic, a proposed union of Libya and Tunisia (1974)
