= Bilād al-ʻArab Awṭānī =

Pan-Arab song

Bilād al-ʻArab Awṭānī (Arabic: بلاد العرب أوطاني) or The Arab Lands are my Homelands is a national Pan-Arabism song that is recited in the Arabic language. It is unofficially recognized as the national anthem of the Arab world. It was written sometime in the 1940s by Fakhri Al-Baroodi and put to music by the Folayfel brothers.

== Lyrics ==
بلادُ العُربِ أوطاني منَ الشّـامِ لبغدادِ ومن نجدٍ إلى يَمَـنٍ ومن مِصـرَ فتطوانِ

The Arab lands are my nation, from the Levant to Baghdad; from Najd to Yemen; and from Egypt to Tétouan

فـلا حـدٌّ يباعدُنا ولا ديـنٌ يفـرّقنا لسان الضَّادِ يجمعُنا بغـسَّانٍ وعـدنانِ

No Borders can separate us, and no religion can divide us; the Language of Ḍād (Arabic) unites us, Ghassanids and Adnanites

بلادُ العُربِ أوطاني منَ الشّـامِ لبغدادِ ومن نجدٍ إلى يَمَـنٍ ومن مِصـرَ فتطوانِ

The Arab lands are my nation, from the Levant to Baghdad; from Najd to Yemen; and from Egypt to Tétouan

لنا مدنيّةُ سَـلفَـتْ سنُحييها وإنْ دُثرَتْ ولو في وجهنا وقفتْ دهاةُ الإنسِ و الجانِ

We have a civilization that has endured, we shall revive it if it fades; even if against us, stood the shrewds of humanity and Jinn

بلادُ العُربِ أوطاني منَ الشّـامِ لبغدادِ ومن نجدٍ إلى يَمَـنٍ ومن مِصـرَ فتطوانِ

The Arab lands are my nations, from the Levant to Baghdad; from Najd to Yemen; and from Egypt to Tétouan

فهبوا يا بني قومي إلى العـلياءِ بالعلمِ و غنوا يا بني أمّي بلادُ العُربِ أوطاني

Rise, O sons of my people, to greatness through knowledge; and sing, O sons of my mother, the Arab lands are my nation

بلادُ العُربِ أوطاني منَ الشّـامِ لبغدادِ ومن نجدٍ إلى يَمَـنٍ ومن مِصـرَ فتطوانِ

The Arab lands are my nation, from the Levant to Baghdad; from Najd to Yemen; and from Egypt to Tétouan

== History ==
The song is a very known Arab song, calling for Arab Unity, and focuses on Unity, Education, and keeping traditions and Arab Culture. Following the Arab Spring, the song was widely used as an unofficial Arab National Anthem in several events, including the 2011 Pan Arab Games.
