= UAR Socialist Youth Organization =

Socialist Youth Organization
- Headquarters: Cairo
- Ideology: Nasserism; Arab nationalism Anti-Zionism; Marxism (Until 1968)
- Mother party: Arab Socialist Union

The UAR Socialist Youth Organization was a youth organization in Egypt. It was set up as the youth wing of the Arab Socialist Union in 1965. It came under the leadership of Marxist sectors. Mufid Shihab was the general secretary of the organization.

Gamal Abdul Nasser clamped down on the organization (as well as other leftist sectors in the Arab Socialist Union) in 1968, halting much of its activities. Many of its activists later left the organization, dissatisfied with Nasser's Arab socialism. These activists became the core of the radical student movement during the early 1970s.
