= 1976 Egyptian presidential confirmation referendum =

- 16 September 1976
- Registered: 9,564,482
- Turnout: 95.75%
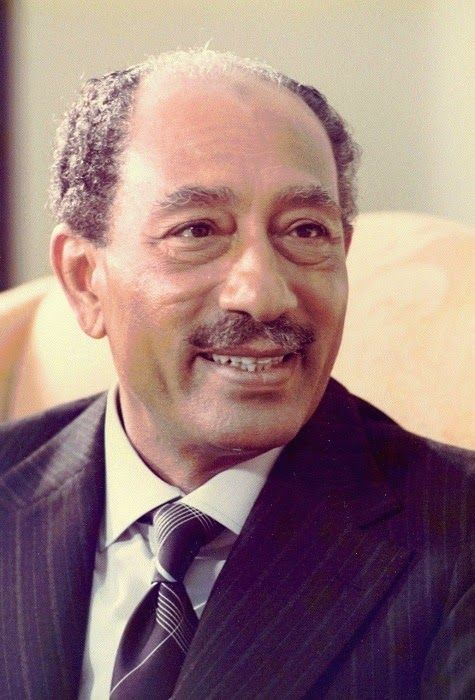
Nominee	Anwar Sadat
Party	ASU
Popular vote	9,145,683
Percentage	99.94%
President before election
Anwar Sadat
ASU
Elected President
Anwar Sadat
ASU

Presidential elections were held in Egypt on 16 September 1976. The elections took the form of a referendum on the candidacy of Anwar El Sadat, who ran unopposed. He allegedly received 99.9% of the vote, with a turnout of 96%.

== Results ==
Candidate	Party	Votes	%
Anwar Sadat	Arab Socialist Union	9,145,683	99.94
Against		5,605	0.06
Total		9,151,288	100.00
Valid votes		9,151,288	99.93
Invalid/blank votes		6,257	0.07
Total votes		9,157,545	100.00
Registered voters/turnout		9,564,482	95.75
Source: Direct Democracy
