= United Arab Republic =

Sovereign state in the Middle East (1958–1971)

Coordinates: 30°02′N 31°13′E

United Arab Republic الجمهورية العربية المتحدة (Arabic) al-Jumhūriyya al-ʿArabiyya al-Muttaḥida
- 1958–1971
- Flag Coat of arms
- Anthem: والله زمان يا سلاحي; Wallāh Zamān, Yā Silāḥī "It's Been So Long, O My Weapon!"
- United Arab Republic from 1958 to 1961 (remained without Syria until its dissolution in 1971)
- Status: Political union (1958–1961); Sovereign state in Egypt (1961–1971) and the Gaza Strip (1961–1967)
- Capital and largest city: Cairo
- Official languages: Arabic
- Religion: Islam; Christianity
- Government: Unitary Arab socialist republic
- President
  - 1958–1970: Gamal Abdel Nasser
  - 1970–1971: Anwar Sadat
- Vice President
  - 1958–1971: List
- Prime Minister
  - 1958–1962 (first): Gamal Abdel Nasser
  - 1970–1971 (last): Mahmoud Fawzi
- Legislature: National Assembly
- Historical era: Cold War; Arab Cold War
  - Formation of the United Arab Republic: 22 February 1958
  - Egyptian administration of Gaza: 1959
  - 1961 Syrian coup d'état: 28 September 1961
  - Israeli invasion of Gaza and Sinai Peninsula: 10 June 1967
  - Death of Nasser: 28 September 1970
  - Corrective revolution: 15 May 1971
  - UAR renamed to Arab Republic of Egypt: 11 September 1971

Area
  - Total: 1,195,000 km^{2} (461,000 sq mi)

Population
  - 1958 estimate: 29,125,000
- Currency: Arab dinar (planned); Egyptian pound (Egypt and Gaza); Syrian pound (Syria)
- Time zone: UTC+2 (EET)
  - Summer (DST): UTC+3 (EEST)
- Calling code: +20
Preceded by
Republic of Egypt
Syrian Republic
All-Palestine Protectorate
Succeeded by
1961; Syrian Arab Republic
1967; Israeli Military Occupation
Arab Republic of Egypt
- Today part of: Egypt; Syria; Palestine (Gaza); Israel (Golan Heights, disputed)

The United Arab Republic (Note: UAR; Arabic: الجمهورية العربية المتحدة, romanized: al-Jumhūriyya al-ʿArabiyya al-Muttaḥida) was a country and sovereign state in the Middle East from 1958 to 1971. It was initially a short-lived political union between the Republic of Egypt (including Egyptian-governed Gaza) and the Second Syrian Republic from 1958 until Syria seceded from the union following the 1961 Syrian coup d'état. Egypt continued to be known officially as the United Arab Republic until it was formally dissolved by Anwar Sadat in September 1971.

The republic was led by Gamal Abdel Nasser as the Egyptian president. The UAR was a member of the United Arab States, a loose confederation with the Mutawakkilite Kingdom of Yemen, which was dissolved in 1961. It was a brief, small, (Note: The UAR covered a limited portion of the larger Arab world countries that spread across West Asia and North Africa, from the Atlantic Ocean to the Arabian Sea) example of a pan-Arab union. The republic is recognized as the first genuine integrated union between two Arab states in the modern era.

== History ==
=== Origins ===
Fellow citizens, praise be to God who was ever by our side as we strove for the high ideals we seek and work to realize. Praise be to God who fulfilled the dreams of the people of Syria and the people of Egypt, unified their hearts, and bound their states as one. Praise be to God, for by His grace, the United Arab Republic has been instituted today. Gamal Abdel Nasser in Damascus, 22 February 1958

Universal Newsreel about the founding of the Republic

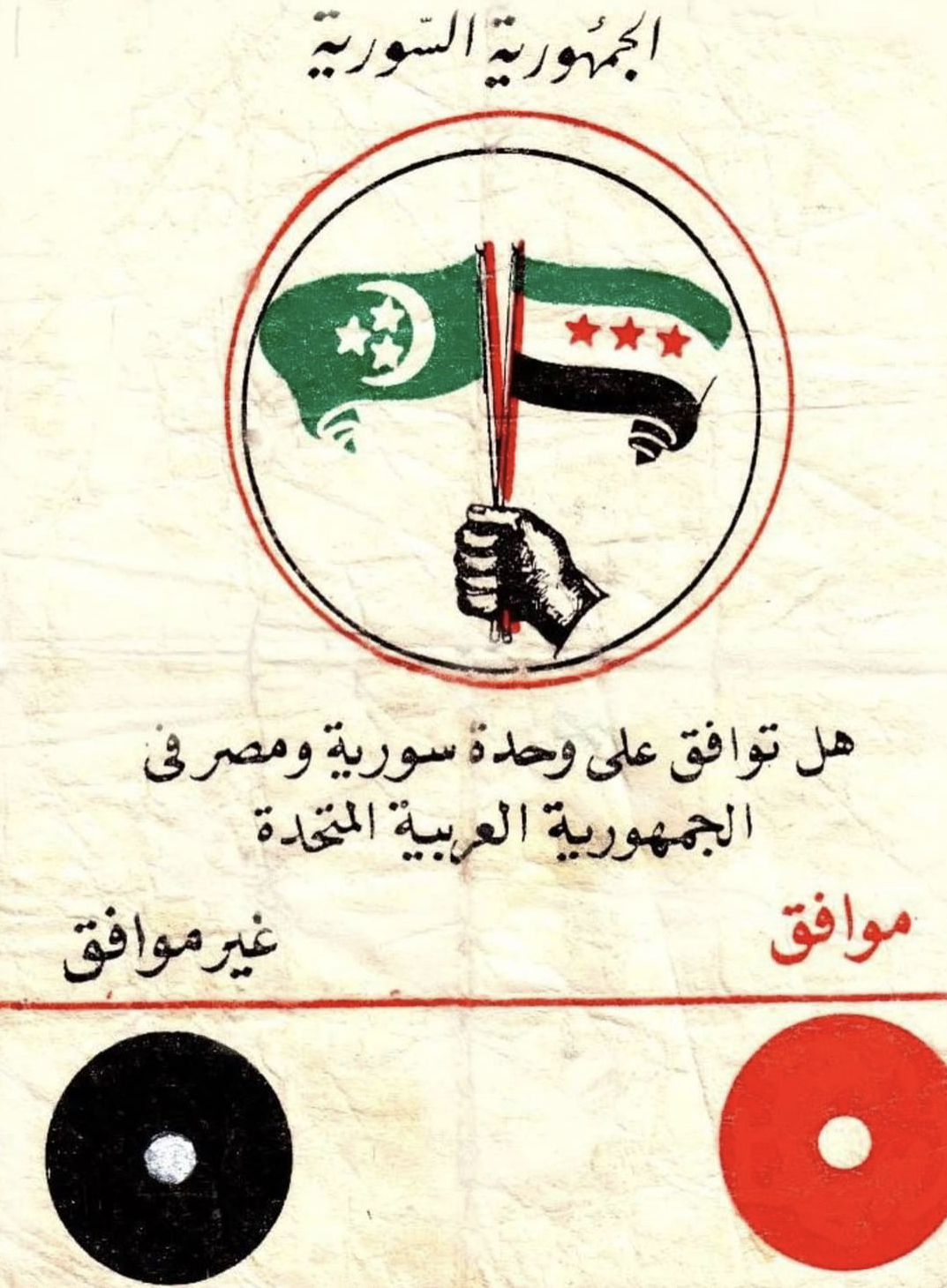
Voting card for the Syrian referendum on unification

The United Arab Republic was established on 1 February 1958 as the first step towards a larger pan-Arab state, which was originally proposed to Egyptian President Gamal Abdel Nasser by a group of political and military leaders in Syria.

Pan-Arab sentiment traditionally was very strong in Syria, and Nasser was a popular heroic figure throughout the Arab world following the 1956 Tripartite Aggression. There was thus considerable popular support in Syria for union with Nasser's Egypt. The Arab Socialist Ba'ath Party was the leading advocate of such a union.

In mid-1957, Western powers began to worry that Syria was close to a Communist takeover; it had a highly organized Communist Party and the newly appointed army's chief of staff, Afif al-Bizri, was a Communist sympathizer. This caused the Syrian Crisis of 1957, after which Syrians intensified their efforts to unite with Egypt. Nasser told a Syrian delegation, including President Shukri al-Quwatli and Prime Minister Khalid al-Azm, that they needed to rid their government of Communists, but the delegation countered and warned him that only total union with Egypt would end the "Communist threat". According to Abdel Latif Boghdadi, Nasser initially resisted a total union with Syria, favoring instead a federal union. However, Nasser was "more afraid of a Communist takeover" and agreed on a total merger. The increasing strength of the Syrian Communist Party, under the leadership of Khalid Bakdash, worried the Syrian Ba'ath Party, which was suffering from an internal crisis from which prominent members were anxious to find an escape. Syria had a liberal-democratic government since the overthrow of Adib Shishakli's military government in 1954, and popular pressure for Arab unity was reflected in the composition of parliament.

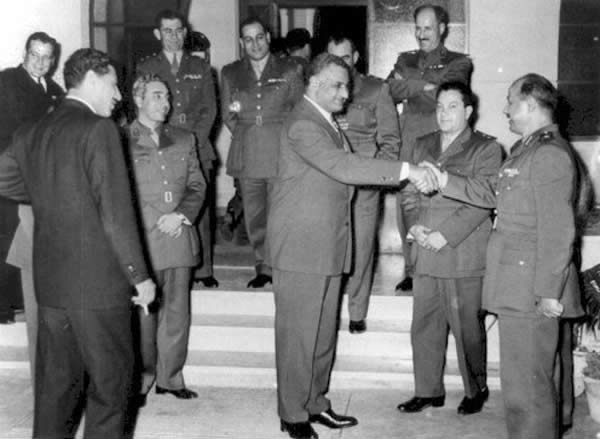
Nasser shaking hands with al-Bizri

On 11 January 1958, the Syrian Chief of Staff Afif al-Bizri headed a Syrian delegation composed of military officers which came uninvited and unannounced to Cairo. The delegation was received by Egyptian Chief of Staff Abdel Hakim Amer and petitioned for a Syrian-Egyptian union. Only Syrian advocates of unity, including Salah al-Din al-Bitar and Akram al-Hourani had prior knowledge of this delegation; Quwatli and Azm were notified a day later and considered it tantamount to a "military coup".

Nasser's final terms for the union were decisive and non-negotiable: "a plebiscite, the dissolution of parties, and the withdrawal of the army from politics". While the plebiscite seemed reasonable to most Syrian elites, the latter two conditions were extremely worrisome. They believed it would destroy political life in Syria. Despite these concerns, the Syrian officials knew it was too late to turn back. Caught between Western and Soviet pressures, the members of the elite in Syria viewed the merger with Egypt as the least bad option to insulate from either side. They believed that Nasser's terms were unfair, but given the intense pressure that their government was undergoing, they believed that they had no other choice.

Referendums were held on 21 February 1958, according to whose results the Egyptians and Syrians voted overwhelmingly in favor of the merger, and for Nasser to be the President. The result was announced on 22 February and Nasser was declared the new president of the United Arab Republic.

Egyptian and Syrian leaders signed the protocols, although Azm did so reluctantly. Nasser became the republic's president and very soon carried out a crackdown against the Syrian Communists and opponents of the union. This included dismissing Bizri and Azm from their posts.

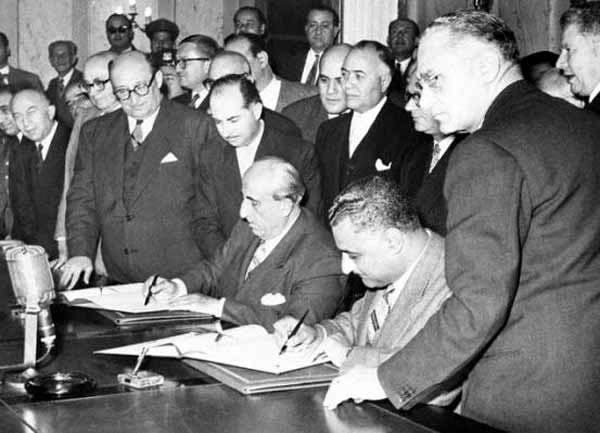
Nasser signing unity pact with Syrian president Shukri al-Quwatli, forming the United Arab Republic, 1 February 1958

=== Early history ===
Advocates of the union believed that Nasser would use the Ba'ath Party for ruling Syria. Unfortunately for the Ba'athists, it was never Nasser's intention to share an equal measure of power. Nasser established a new provisional constitution proclaiming a 600-member National Assembly with 400 members from Egypt and 200 members from Syria, and the disbanding of all political parties, including the Ba'ath. Nasser gave each of the provinces two vice-presidents, assigning Boghdadi and Abdel Hakim Amer to Egypt and Sabri al-Asali and Akram al-Hourani – a leader of the Ba'ath – to Syria. The new provisional constitution of 1958 was adopted.

Though Nasser allowed former Ba'ath Party members to hold prominent political positions, they never reached positions as high in the government as did the Egyptian officials. During the winter and the spring of 1959–60, Nasser slowly squeezed prominent Syrians out of positions of influence. In the Syrian Ministry of Industry, for example, seven of the top thirteen positions were filled by Egyptians. In the General Petroleum Authority, four of the top six officials were Egyptian. In the fall of 1958, Nasser formed a tripartite committee, consisting of Zakaria Mohieddin, al-Hawrani, and Bitar to oversee the affairs in Syria. By moving the latter two, both Ba'athists, to Cairo, he neutralized important political figures who had their own ideas about how Syria should be run within the UAR.

In Syria, opposition to union with Egypt mounted. Syrian Army officers resented being subordinate to Egyptian officers, and Syrian Bedouin tribes received money from Saudi Arabia to prevent them from becoming loyal to Nasser. Also, Egyptian-style land reform was resented for damaging Syrian agriculture, the Communists began to gain influence, and the intellectuals of the Ba'ath Party who supported the union rejected the one-party system. Mustafa al-Barudi, the Syrian Minister of Propaganda, stated that 'the smallest member of the (Egyptian) retinue thought that he had inherited our country. [Egyptians] spread "like octopuses" everywhere.' Nasser was not able to address problems in Syria completely, because they were new to him, and instead of appointing Syrians to run Syria, he assigned this position to Amer and Abdul Hamid al-Sarraj (a Syrian army official and Nasser sympathizer).

In Egypt, the situation was more positive, with a GNP growth of 4.5 per cent and a rapid growth of industry. In 1960, Nasser nationalized the Egyptian press, reducing it to his personal mouthpiece.

=== Foreign relations ===
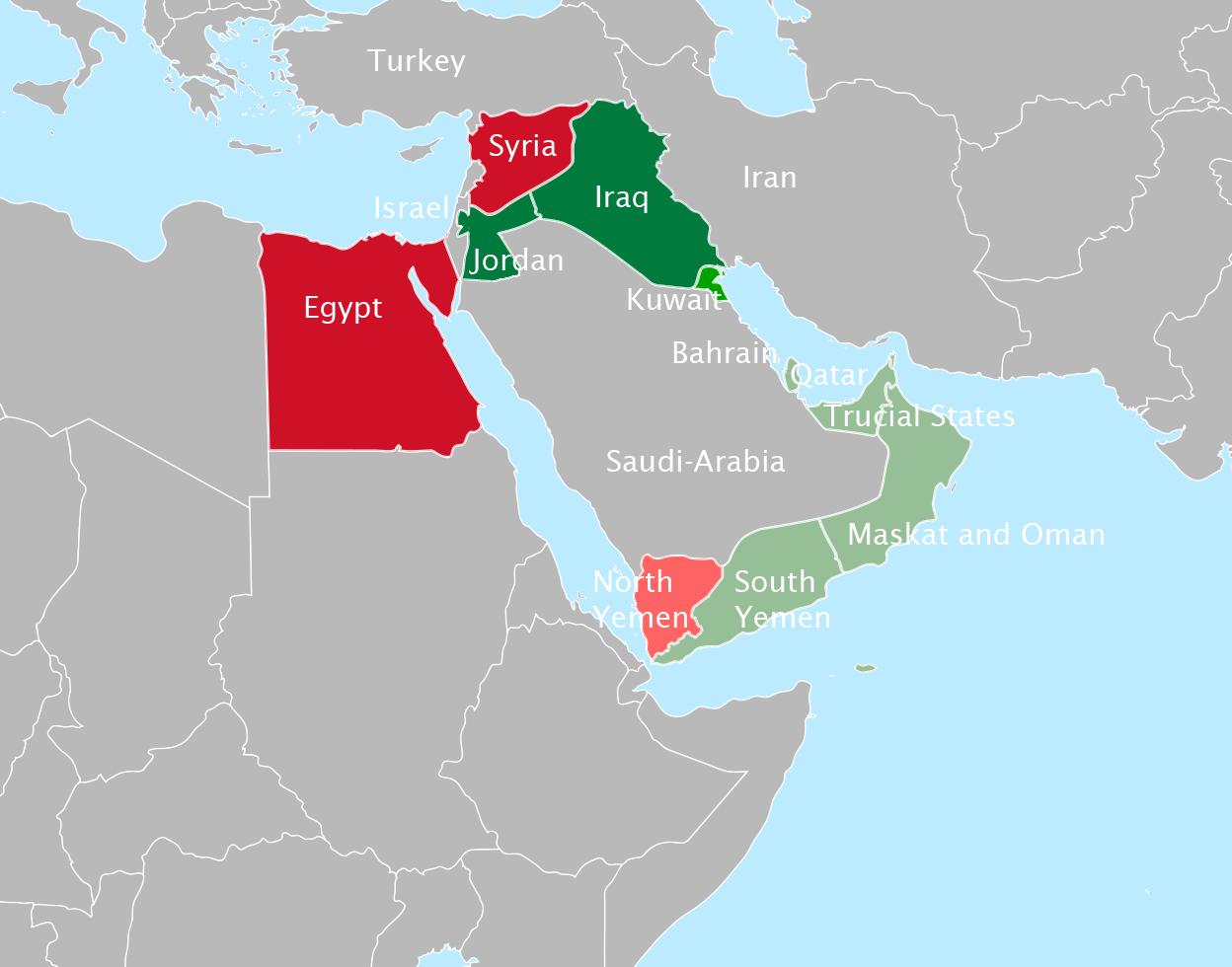
Middle East in 1958: United Arab Republic (red), United Arab States (red and light-red), Arab Federation (green), British Kuwait (grass green), other British protectorates in South and East Arabia (light green)

The creation of the union was widely interpreted by the other nations of the world as a major threat to Jordan. Syria was seen as a source of instigation and shelter for Jordanian dissidents plotting against King Hussein. Egypt's status as being unfriendly to Western influence in the region (and thus to the close relationship between the British and the Hashemite Jordanian and Iraqi monarchies) added to the pressure. To counter the UAR's influence, King Hussein proposed a Jordanian-Iraqi counter-alliance to Faisal II of Iraq; leading to the formation of the Arab Federation on 14 February 1958. Jordan and Iraq agreed to establish a unified military command with a unified military budget, 80 percent of which was to be provided by Iraq and the remaining 20 percent by Jordan. Troops from both countries were exchanged in the arrangement.

In nearby Lebanon, President Camille Chamoun, an opponent of Nasser, viewed the creation of the UAR with worry. Pro-Nasser factions in the country were mostly Muslims and Druze, while the Christian Maronite population generally supported Chamoun. These two sides began clashing, culminating in a civil war by May 1958. The former favoured merging with the UAR, while the latter feared the new country as a satellite of Communism. Although Nasser did not covet Lebanon, seeing it as a special case, he felt obliged to back his supporters through giving Abdul Hamid al-Sarraj the task of sending them money and light arms, and training officers.

On 14 July 1958, Iraqi army officers staged a military coup and overthrew the Kingdom of Iraq – which had only recently united with Jordan to form the rival Arab Federation. Nasser declared his recognition of the new government and stated that "any attack on Iraq was tantamount to an attack on the UAR". The next day British special forces and US marines landed in Lebanon and in Jordan, respectively, to prevent the two countries from opening up to pro-Nasser forces. To Nasser, the revolution in Iraq opened the road for Arab nationalism. Although most members of the Iraqi Revolutionary Command Council (RCC) favoured joining Iraq with the UAR, the new prime minister Abdul Karim Qasim disagreed. Said Aburish states reasons for this could have included Nasser's refusal to cooperate with and encourage the Iraqi Free Officers a year before the coup – or Qasim viewed Nasser as a threat to his supremacy as leader of Iraq.

Later in July, the US government convinced Chamoun not to seek a second term. This allowed the election of Fouad Chehab as Lebanon's new president. Nasser and Chehab met at the Lebanese–Syrian border and Nasser explained to Chehab that he never wanted unity with Lebanon, but only that the country not be used as a base against the UAR. This meeting resulted in the end of the crisis in Lebanon, with Nasser ceasing to supply his partisans and America setting a deadline for retreating from the area.

After the 14 July Revolution in 1958, which brought an end to the Hashemite dynasty in Iraq, Iraq emerged as one of the most supportive Arab states towards the UAR. Iraq sought to join the union; however, in 1959, Qasim cancelled the unity talks. After Qasim's overthrow in 1963, the idea of the union was resurrected with the proposal of a tripartite union of Egypt, Iraq, and Syria to form a new United Arab Republic. A new flag was proposed, with three stars symbolizing the three states constituting the proposed union. Although the plan for a tri-partite union never materialised, Iraq continued to use the three-star flag and later adopted it as its national flag. This three-star flag remained Iraq's national flag (with some modifications) until 2007.

=== Nationalization ===
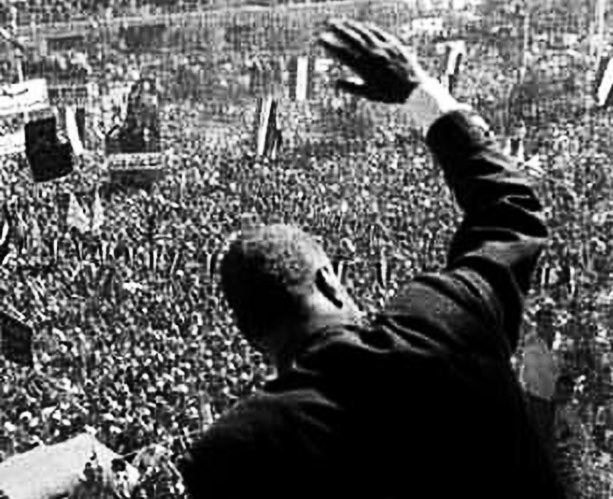
Nasser addressing the people of Damascus, 1960

In June 1960, Nasser tried to establish economic reforms that would bring the Syrian economy more in line with the strong Egyptian public sector. However, these changes did little to help either economy. Rather than shift growth toward the private sector, Nasser embarked on an unprecedented wave of nationalizations in both Syria and Egypt. These began in July 1961, without consulting top Syrian economic officials. The entire cotton trade was taken over by the government, as well as all import-export firms. Nasser announced the nationalization of banks, insurance companies, and all heavy industry, 23 July 1961. Nasser also extended his social justice principles. The land limit was reduced from 200 to 100 feddans. Interest rates for farmers were dramatically reduced to the point of elimination in some cases. A ninety percent tax was instituted on all income above £E10,000. Workers and employees were allowed representatives on management boards. They were also given the right to a twenty-five percent share in the profit of their firm. The average workday was also cut from eight hours to seven without a reduction in pay.

=== Culture ===
Upon accepting the 1960 Best Supporting Actor award given to Hugh Griffith for his "wonderfully humorous, human, and sympathetic characterization of an Arab sheik" in Ben-Hur (1959), director William Wyler expressed regret that the people of the United Arab Republic would not be permitted to see Griffith's performance.

=== Dissolution ===
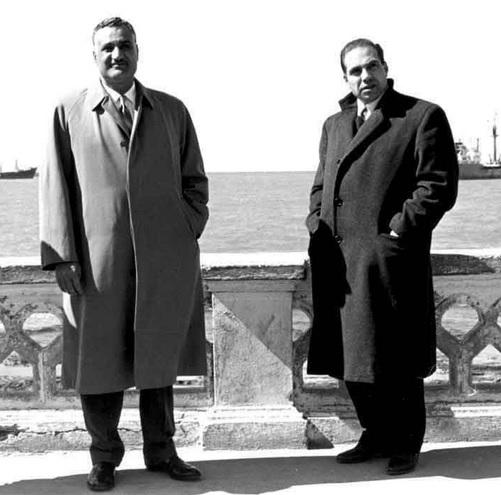
Nasser and Sarraj in Latakia, 1959

Instead of a federation of two Arab peoples, as many Syrians had imagined, the UAR turned into a state completely dominated by Egyptians. Syrian political life was also diminished, as Nasser demanded all political parties in Syria to be dismantled. In the process, the strongly centralized Egyptian state imposed Nasser's socialistic political and economic system on weaker Syria, leading to backlash from Syrian business and army circles, which resulted in the Syrian coup of 28 September 1961, and the end of the UAR as a political union. According to Moshe Ma'oz, "...this unity scheme was successful in consolidating the shaky Syrian identity. In fact, once the Syrians lost their independence they suddenly realized that they did indeed possess a different identity than the Egyptians."

Despite the economic difficulties, what truly produced the demise of the UAR was Nasser's inability to find a suitable political system for the new regime. Given his Arab socialist ideology in Egypt, the Ba'ath Party should have been his natural ally, but Nasser was hesitant to share power. Though Amer allowed some liberalization of the economy to appease Syrian businessmen, his decision to rig the elections of the National Union (the single party which replaced the Ba'ath), with the help of Colonel Abdul Hamid Sarraj (a Syrian army official and Nasser sympathizer), antagonized Ba'athist leaders. The Ba'ath Party won only five percent of the seats on the higher committees, while the more traditional conservative parties won a significant majority. Sarraj was appointed the head of the National Union in Syria, and by the spring of 1960 had replaced Amer as the chair of the Syrian Executive Council. Under Sarraj Syria was ruled by a repressive security force designed to suppress all opposition to the regime.

The immense increases in public sector control were accompanied by a push for centralisation. In August 1961 Nasser abolished regional governments in favour of one central authority, which operated from Damascus February through May and from Cairo for the rest of the year. As a part of this centralisation, Sarraj was relocated to Cairo, where he found himself with little real power. 15 September 1961, Sarraj returned to Syria, and after meeting with Nasser and Amer resigned from all his posts on 26 September.

Without any close allies to watch over Syria, Nasser was unaware of the growing unrest of the military. On 28 September a group of officers staged a coup and declared Syria's independence from the UAR. Though the coup leaders were willing to renegotiate a union under terms they felt would put Syria on an equal footing with Egypt, Nasser refused such a compromise. He initially considered sending troops to overthrow the new regime, but chose not to once he was informed that the last of his allies in Syria had been defeated. In speeches that followed the coup, Nasser declared he would never give up his goal of an ultimate Arab union. However, he would never again achieve such a tangible victory toward this goal.

=== After Syria's withdrawal ===
After Syria's withdrawal from the union in 1961, Egypt's official name remained the "United Arab Republic" name until 1971.

In the early 1960s, Nasser sent an expeditionary army to Yemen to support the anti-monarchist forces in the North Yemen Civil War.

From 5 to 10 June in 1967, Israel invaded Gaza, the West Bank, the Golan Heights, and the Sinai Peninsula during the Six-Day War. Egypt recovered partial sovereignty over the Sinai Peninsula in 1978, but only after agreeing to recognize Israel. Anwar Sadat, who reversed many of the socialist reforms enacted under Nasser, extended diplomatic recognition to Israel despite their ongoing occupation of lands seized in 1967. Israel maintained an occupation of these territories and created illegal settlements. After 1994, the Palestinian Authority, created by the Oslo Accords, established a degree of Palestinian civil administration in Gaza. Israel's retreat from Gaza in 2005 was not followed by resumption of control by Egypt. Since 2007, Gaza has been administered by the Palestinian party Hamas.

Egypt formally changed its name to the Arab Republic of Egypt on 2 September 1971.

== Armed forces ==
Following the formation of the United Arab Republic, the Syrian Army was designated as the First Army, and the Egyptian Army was designated as the Second Army.

== Flag ==
The UAR adopted a flag based on the Arab Liberation Flag of the Egyptian Revolution of 1952, but with two stars to represent the two parts of the UAR. From 1980 to 2024 this was the official flag of Syria. In 1963, Iraq adopted a flag that was similar but with three stars, representing the hope that Iraq would join the UAR. The current flags of Egypt, Sudan and Yemen are also based on the 1952 Arab Liberation Flag of horizontal red, white and black bands.

== Geography ==
United Arab Republic

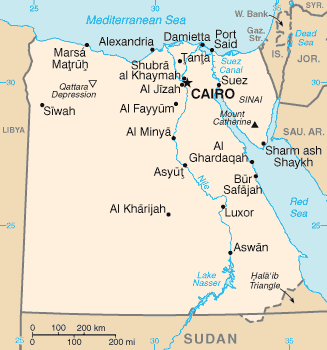
Southern Region (Egypt)

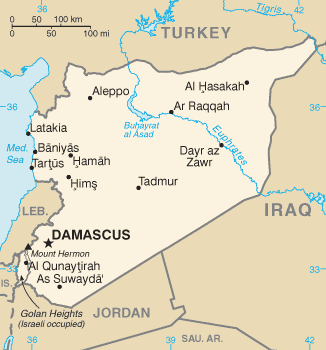
Northern Region (Syria)

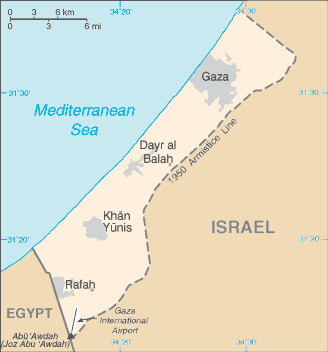
Gaza Strip

If it existed today, the United Arab Republic would be the 25th largest nation on the planet (Egypt is 30th and Syria is 88th). It was comparable in size to South Africa, and twice the size of France. Following the dissolution of the All-Palestine Government in 1959, the United Arab Republic further exerted administration over Gaza, until 1967.

== Sport ==
A team representing the United Arab Republic competed at the 1960 Summer Olympics in Rome. The UAR won one silver and one bronze medal.

== Office holders ==
=== Presidents of the United Arab Republic ===
Name	Term of office		Party
Gamal Abdel Nasser جمال عبد الناصر (1918–1970)	22 February 1958	1 December 1962	National Union
Gamal Abdel Nasser جمال عبد الناصر (1918–1970)	1 December 1962	28 September 1970	Arab Socialist Union
Anwar Sadat أنور السادات (1918–1981)	28 September 1970 acting to 15 October 1970	11 September 1971	Arab Socialist Union

=== Chairman of the Executive Council of the Southern Region (Egypt) ===
Portrait	Name (Birth–Death)	Term of office			Political party
Portrait	Name (Birth–Death)	Took office	Left office	Time in office	Political party
	Nureddin Tarraf نور الدين طراف (1910–1995)	7 October 1958	20 September 1960	1 year, 349 days	National Union
	Kamal el-Din Hussein كمال الدين حسين (1921–1999)	20 September 1960	16 August 1961	330 days	National Union

=== Chairman of the Executive Council of the Northern Region (Syria) ===
Portrait	Name (Birth–Death)	Term of office			Political party
Portrait	Name (Birth–Death)	Took office	Left office	Time in office	Political party
	Nur al-Din Kahala نور الدين كحالة (1908–1965)	7 October 1958	20 September 1960	1 year, 349 days	National Union
	Abdel Hamid al-Sarraj عبد الحميد السراج (1925–2013)	20 September 1960	16 August 1961	330 days	National Union

== See also ==
- History of modern Egypt
- Pan-Arabism
  - League of Arab States (1972–present)
  - Arab Federation (1958) – The Kingdom of Iraq and the Kingdom of Jordan
  - United Arab States (1958–1961) – Egypt, the Kingdom of North Yemen, and Syria
  - Federation of Arab Republics (1972–1977) – Egypt, Syria, and Libya
  - Arab Islamic Republic (1974) – Libya and Tunisia
  - Invasion of Kuwait (1990–1991) – Iraq and Kuwait
- United Arab Emirates
- Arab Cold War
