= Hussein Sirri Amer =

Mid-20th-century Egyptian general

Hussein Sirri Amer was a senior Egyptian general during the reign of King Farouk, to whom he was notably loyal. He served as the Commander of the Frontier Corps. During the 1948 Arab-Israeli War he was believed by members of the officer corps of being complicit in the distribution of faulty arms to Egyptian troops. When General Muhammad Naguib was set to be appointed War Minister by Prime Minister Hussein Sirri Pasha and had the support of the officer corps, King Farouk intervened to have Amer appointed instead. Amer's holding of the post was meant to keep potential disloyalty within the armed forces in check. An assassination attempt against Amer by members of the Free Officers, including future president Gamal Abdel Nasser, took place in January 1952, but failed. Following the Egyptian Revolution of 1952, Amer was tried for his role in the arms scandal of the 1948 war.

== Bibliography ==
- Alexander, Anne (2005), Nasser Life and Times (illustrated ed.), Haus Publishing, ISBN 978-1-904341-83-3
- Bogle, Emory C. (1996), The Modern Middle East: From Imperialism to Freedom, 1800-1958, Prentice Hall, ISBN 9780132065092
- Jabber, Paul (1981), Not by War Alone: Security and Arms Control in the Middle East, University of California Press, ISBN 9780520040502
- Nutting, Anthony (1972), Nasser, New York City: E.P. Dutton, ISBN 978-0-525-16415-9
