= 1958 Egyptian United Arab Republic referendum =

- 21 February 1958
- Presidential referendum
- Registered: 6,220,343
- Turnout: 98.13%
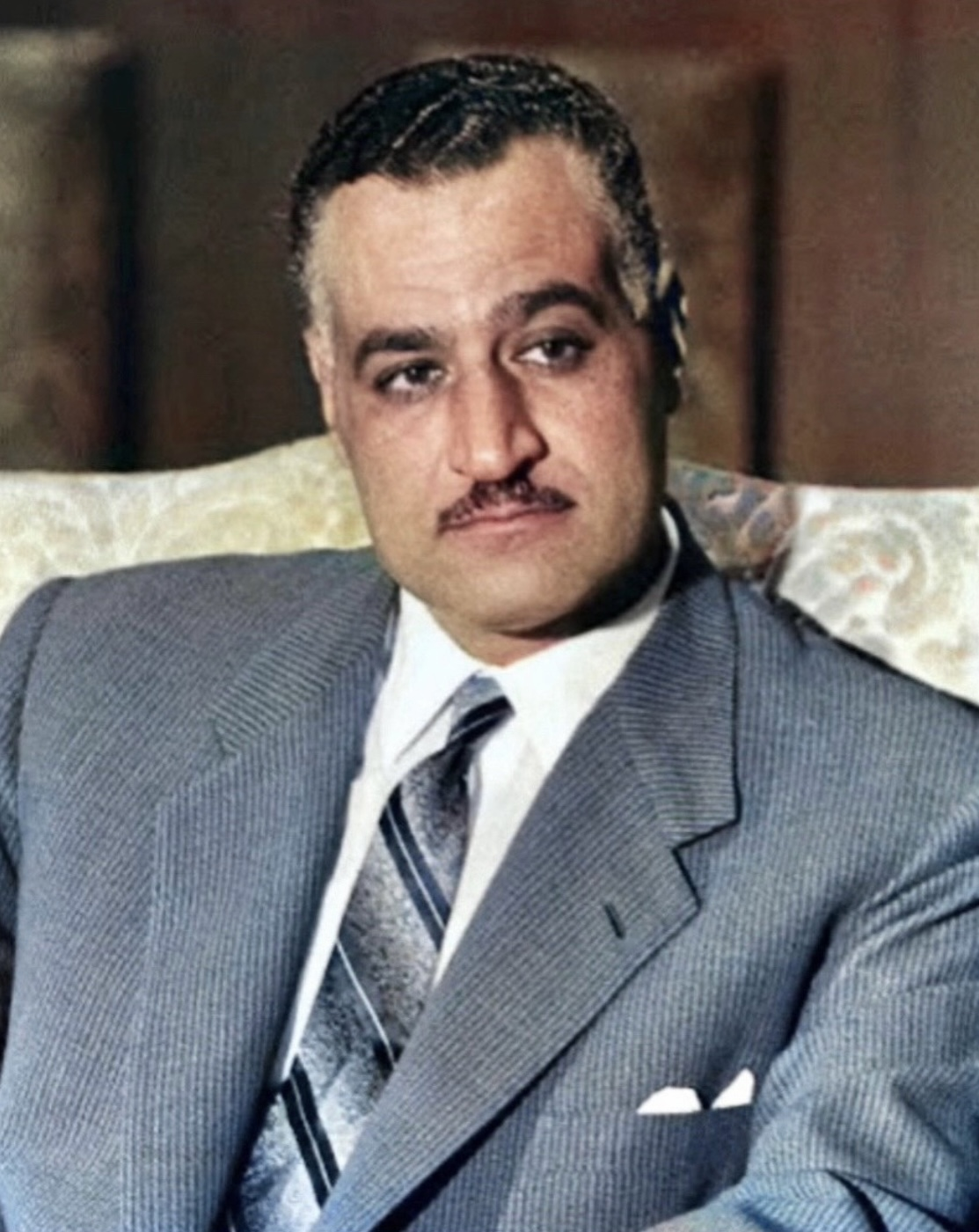
Nominee	Gamal Abdel Nasser
Party	NU
Popular vote	6,102,116
Percentage	100%
- Results by constituent state Nasser: 95–100% 100%
President before election
Gamal Abdel Nasser
NU
Elected President
Gamal Abdel Nasser
NU
- Creation of the United Arab Republic
- Approval of the merger between Egypt and Syria to form the United Arab Republic (UAR).
- Outcome: Egypt and Syria unite to form the United Arab Republic

Results
Choice	Votes	%
Yes	6,102,128	100.00%
No	247	0.00%
Valid votes	6,102,375	99.97%
Invalid or blank votes	1,884	0.03%
Total votes	6,104,259	100.00%
Registered voters/turnout	6,220,343	98.13%

A referendum on the creation of the United Arab Republic was held in Egypt on 21 February 1958, alongside a simultaneous referendum in Syria. The referendum consisted of two questions; one on the formation of the UAR, and the other on Gamal Abdel Nasser's candidacy for the post of President of the UAR. Both were approved, with reported results of fewer than 300 votes against, and a 98% voter turnout.

== Results ==
=== United Arab Republic ===
Choice	Votes	%
For	6,102,128	100.00
Against	247	0.00
Total	6,102,375	100.00
Valid votes	6,102,375	99.97
Invalid/blank votes	1,884	0.03
Total votes	6,104,259	100.00
Registered voters/turnout	6,220,343	98.13
Source: Nohlen et al.

=== Nasser for President ===
Choice	Votes	%
For	6,102,116	100.00
Against	265	0.00
Total	6,102,381	100.00
Valid votes	6,102,381	99.97
Invalid/blank votes	1,881	0.03
Total votes	6,104,262	100.00
Registered voters/turnout	6,220,343	98.13
Source: Nohlen et al.
