= 1956 Egyptian referendum =

Referendums on presidency and constitution

- 23 June 1956
- Registered: 5,859,000
- Turnout: 94.01%
- Nasser for president
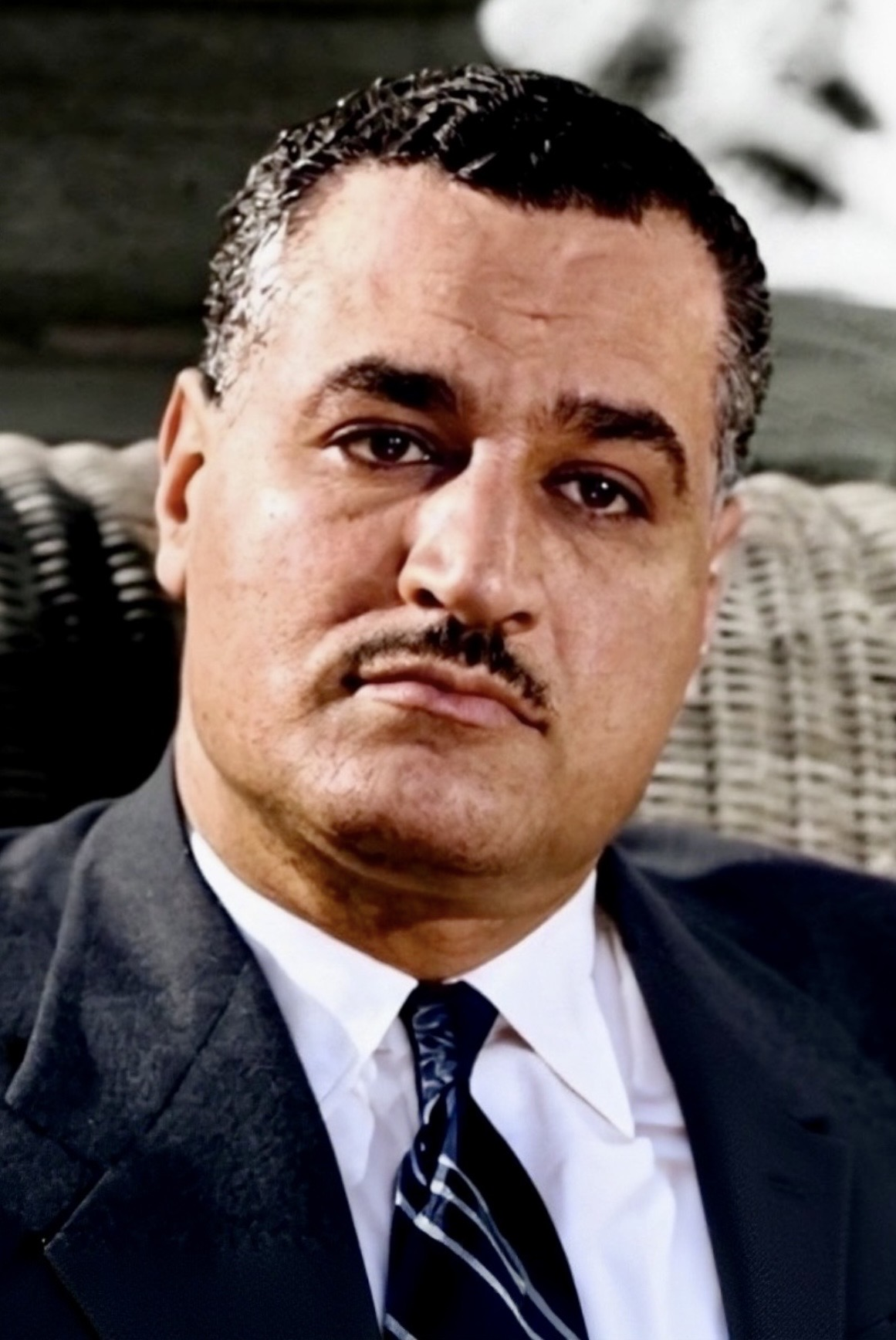
Nominee	Gamal Abdel Nasser
Party	Liberation Rally
Popular vote	5,499,555
Percentage	99.90%
President before election
Gamal Abdel Nasser (as Chairman of the Revolutionary Command Council)
Liberation Rally
Elected President
Gamal Abdel Nasser
Liberation Rally

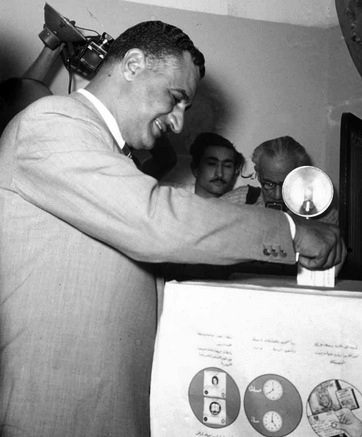
Nasser casting his vote in the 1956 constitutional referendum

A double referendum was held in Egypt on 23 June 1956. The two issues were the candidacy of Gamal Abdel Nasser for the presidency and a new constitution. Both were approved, with the official figures showing 99.9% in favour of Nasser's candidacy and 99.8% in favour of the constitution.

== Background ==
Before the vote, Nasser had been consolidating power after ousting Muhammad Naguib and launching a massive crackdown against the Muslim Brotherhood in 1954. Other opposition forces had been previously outflanked by the Liberation Rally, the official political movement of the state set up by the Revolutionary Command Council following the abolition of political parties in 1953. The Liberation Rally's purpose was to acquire mass support for the RCC across the country The press also endorsed and urged support for the referendums. Another chief contributor to Nasser's growing legitimacy was his charisma. The incumbent government chose a constitutional committee to pen the new constitution, although its members were picked by Nasser himself.

== Results ==
The referendums were overwhelmingly supported by the electorate. According to government tallies, Nasser's bid for the presidency and the proposed constitution received almost unanimous approval by voters. Nasser ran uncontested, nominated by the new ruling party, the National Union. Historian Kirk J. Beatie wrote the government figures were likely fictitious, but it is also "impossible to know how accurate they were." Nasser successfully used the vote to promote himself as the protector of democracy, but according to author May Kassem, the vote "was utilized in an authoritarian manner" that only served to consecrate Nasser's rule. The next year, the Liberation Rally was reorganized into the National Union (NU).

=== Nasser for President ===
Choice	Votes	%
For	5,499,555	99.90
Against	5,267	0.10
Total	5,504,822	100.00
Valid votes	5,504,822	99.94
Invalid/blank votes	3,492	0.06
Total votes	5,508,314	100.00
Registered voters/turnout	5,859,000	94.01
Source: Nohlen et al.

=== New constitution ===
Choice	Votes	%
For	5,488,255	99.82
Against	10,016	0.18
Total	5,498,271	100.00
Valid votes	5,498,271	99.82
Invalid/blank votes	10,043	0.18
Total votes	5,508,314	100.00
Registered voters/turnout	5,859,000	94.01
Source: Nohlen et al.
