= Pan-Arabism =

Ideology espousing the unification of Arabs

Map of the Arab world

The flag of the Arab Revolt was originally used against the Ottoman Turks, and remains a prominent symbol of pan-Arabism. The design and colours are the basis of many modern Arab states' flags.

The Arab Liberation Flag was created by the Free Officers movement that led the 1952 Egyptian revolution. The flag is associated with Nasserism, republicanism, and Pan-Arabism. Several modern Arab flags use the Arab Liberation Flag as a model.

Pan-Arabism (Arabic: الوحدة العربية, romanized: al-waḥda al-ʿarabiyyah, lit. 'Arab unity') is a pan-nationalist ideology that espouses the unification of all Arab people in a single nation-state, consisting of all Arab countries of West Asia and North Africa from the Atlantic Ocean to the Arabian Sea, which is referred to as the Arab world.

It is closely connected to Arab nationalism, which asserts the view that the Arabs constitute a single nation. It originated in the late 19th century among the Arab regions of the Ottoman Empire, and its popularity reached its height during the peak of Nasserism and Ba'athism in the 1950s and 1960s. Advocates of pan-Arabism have often espoused Arab socialist principles and strongly opposed the political involvement of the Western world in the Arab world. It also sought to empower Arab states against outside forces by forming alliances such as the Arab League.

== Origins and development ==
The origins of pan-Arabism are often attributed to the Nahda (Arab awakening or enlightenment) movement that flourished in the Arab regions of the Ottoman Empire in the late 19th century. A prominent figure was Jurji Zaydan (1861–1914), who played a key role in laying the intellectual foundation for pan-Arabism. Zaydan had critical influence on acceptance of a modernized version of the Quranic Arabic language (Modern Standard Arabic) as the universal written and official language throughout the Arab world, instead of adoption of local dialects in the various countries. Zaydan wrote several articles during the early 20th century which emphasized that Arabic-speaking regions stretching from the Maghreb to the Persian Gulf constitute one people with a shared national consciousness and that this linguistic bond trumped religious, racial and specific territorial bonds, inspired in part by his status as a Levantine Christian émigré in 19th century Egypt. He also popularized through his historical novels a secular understanding of Arab history encompassing the pre-Islamic and Islamic periods into a shared history that all Arabs could claim as their own.

As a political project, pan-Arabism was first pressed by Sharif Hussein ibn Ali, the Sharif of Mecca, who sought independence for the Mashreq Arabs from the Ottoman Empire, and the establishment of a unified Arab state in the Mashreq. In 1915 and 1916, the Hussein-McMahon Correspondence resulted in an agreement between the United Kingdom and the Sharif that if the Mashreq Arabs revolted successfully against the Ottomans, the United Kingdom would support claims for Mashreq Arab independence. In 1916, however, the Sykes-Picot Agreement between the United Kingdom and France determined that parts of the Mashreq would be divided between those powers rather than forming part of an independent Arab state. When the Ottoman Empire surrendered in 1918, the United Kingdom refused to keep to the letter of its arrangements with Hussein, and the two nations assumed guardianship of Mesopotamia, Lebanon, Palestine and what became modern Syria. Ultimately, Hussein became King of only Hijaz, in the then less strategically valuable south, but lost his Caliphate throne when the kingdom was sacked by the Najdi Ikhwan forces of the Saudites and forcefully incorporated into the newly created Kingdom of Saudi Arabia.

A more formalized pan-Arab ideology than that of Hussein was first espoused in the 1930s, notably by Syrian thinkers such as Constantin Zureiq, Sati' al-Husri, Zaki al-Arsuzi, and Michel Aflaq. Aflaq and al-Arsuzi were key figures in the establishment of the Arab Ba’ath (Renaissance) Party, and the former was for long its chief ideologist, combining elements of Marxist thought with nationalism to a considerable extent reminiscent of nineteenth-century European romantic nationalism. It has been said that Arsuzi was fascinated with the Nazi ideology of "racial purity" and impacted Aflaq.

Abdullah I of Jordan dreamed of uniting Syria, Palestine, and Jordan under his leadership in what he would call Greater Syria. He unsuccessfully proposed a plan to this effect to the United Kingdom, which controlled Palestine at that time. The plan was not popular among the majority of Arabs and fostered distrust among the leaders of the other Middle Eastern countries against Abdullah. The distrust of Abdullah's expansionist aspirations was one of the principal reasons for the founding of the Arab League in 1945. Once Abdullah was assassinated by a Palestinian nationalist in 1951, the vision of Greater Syria was dropped from the Jordanian agenda.

Although pan-Arabism began at the time of World War I, Egypt (the most populous and arguably most important Arab country) was not interested in pan-Arabism prior to the 1950s. Thus, in the 1930s and 1940s, Egyptian nationalism – not pan-Arabism – was the dominant mode of expression of Egyptian political activists. James Jankowski wrote about Egypt at the time,

What is most significant is the absence of an Arab component in early Egyptian nationalism. The thrust of Egyptian political, economic, and cultural development throughout the nineteenth century worked against, rather than for, an 'Arab' orientation. ... This situation—that of divergent political trajectories for Egyptians and Arabs—if anything increased after 1900.

== Attempts at Arab union ==
It was not until Gamal Abdel Nasser that Arab nationalism (in addition to Arab socialism) became a state policy and a means with which to define Egypt's position in the Middle East and the world, usually articulated vis-à-vis Zionism in the neighboring state of Israel.

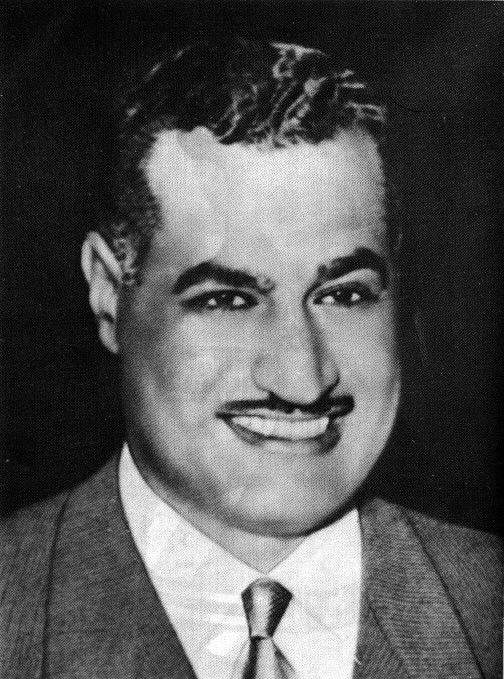
Under Egyptian President Gamal Abdel Nasser, pan-Arabism dominated politics in the 1950s and 1960s.

There have been several attempts to bring about a pan-Arab state by many well-known Arab leaders, all of which ultimately resulted in failure. British Foreign Minister Anthony Eden called for Arab unity during the 1940s, and was followed by specific proposals from pro-British leaders, including King Abdullah of Transjordan and Prime Minister Nuri al-Said of Iraq, but Egyptian proposals for a broader grouping of independent Arab states prevailed with the establishment of the League of Arab States, a regional international organization, in 1945. In large part representing the popularity Nasser had gained among the masses in the Arab world following the Suez Crisis, the United Arab Republic (UAR) in 1958 was the first case of the actual merger of two previously independent Arab countries. Hastily formed under President Nasser's leadership but on the initiative of Syrian leaders who feared a takeover by communists or "reactionaries" and hoped to lead the new entity, the UAR was a unitary state, not a federal union, with its critics seeing this as hardly more than a small country being annexed by a larger one. It lasted until 1961, when Syrian army officers carried out a coup d'état and withdrew from the union. As politicians felt pressured by the wide public to espouse the idea of unity, Egypt, Syria and Iraq entered into an abortive agreement in 1963 to form the United Arab Republic, which was to be "federal in structure, leaving each member state its identity and institutions." By 1961, Egypt had become the only remaining member but continued to call itself "the UAR" (thereby implying it was open for unification with other Arab countries), but it eventually renamed itself the "Arab Republic of Egypt" in 1973.

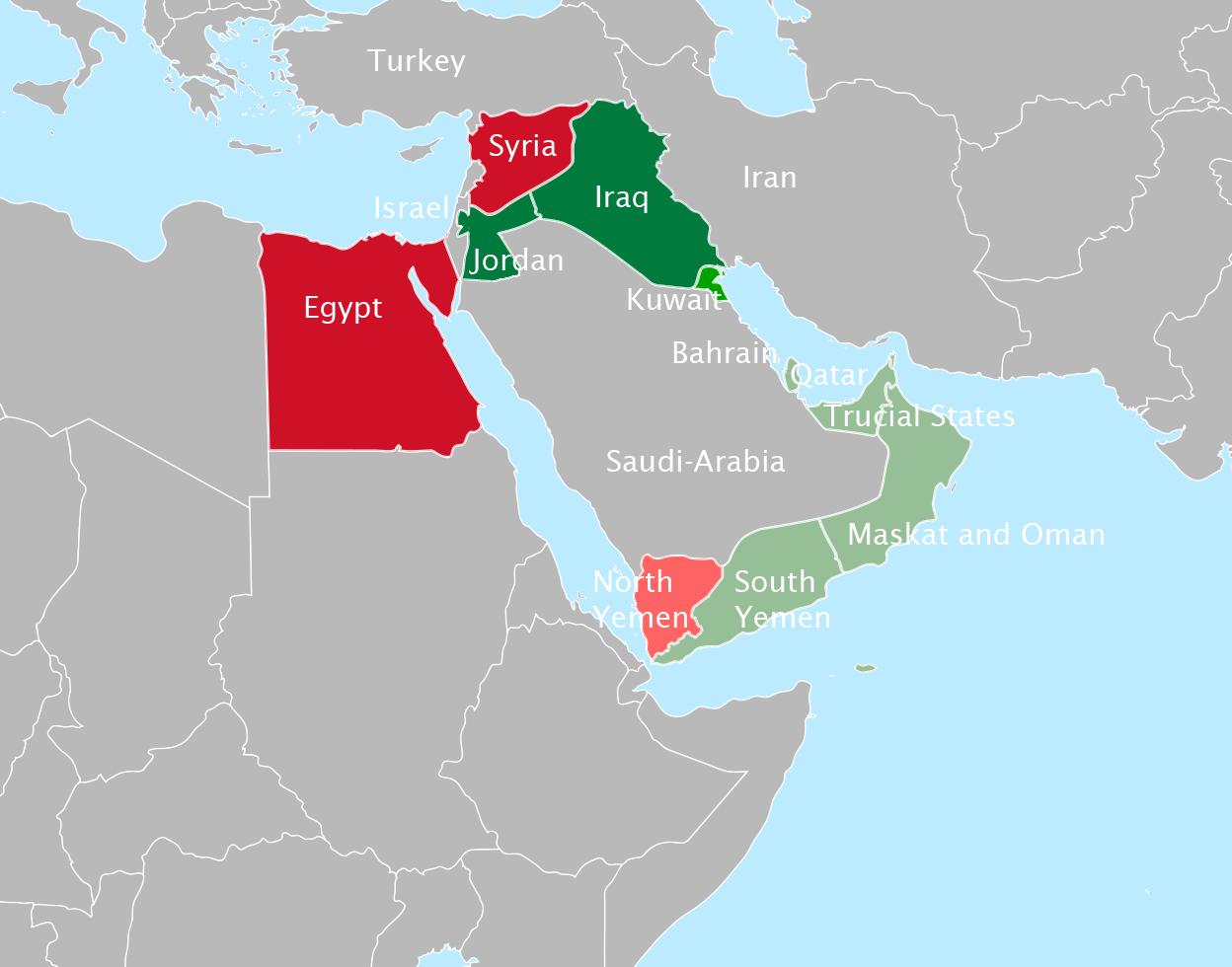
Middle East in 1958: United Arab Republic (red), United Arab States (red and light-red), Arab Federation (green), British Kuwait (grass green), other British protectorates in the Arab Gulf (light green)

Also in 1958, a Hashemite-led rival, the Arab Federation, was founded between Jordan and Iraq. Tensions with the UAR and the 14 July Revolution made the Arab Federation collapse after only six months. Another attempt, the United Arab States, existed as a confederation between the United Arab Republic and the Mutawakkilite Kingdom of Yemen, but it dissolved in 1961.

Two later attempts represented the enthusiasm of Libya's Muammar Gaddafi, the Federation of Arab Republics, which lasted five years, and the Arab Islamic Republic with Tunisia, which also aimed to include Algeria and Morocco but never emerged in practice. Muammar Gaddafi had talks with Chadli Bendjedid in 1988 about forming an Algeria-Libya union. Instead the Arab Maghreb Union was formed in 1989. Aside from the forcible unification of much of the Arabian Peninsula by the Saudi rulers of Najd during the 1920s, the unity of seven Arab emirates that form the United Arab Emirates and the unification of North Yemen and South Yemen stand today as rare examples of actual unification. The former governments of Iraq and Syria were both led by rival factions of the Ba'ath Party, which, until the fall of the Assad regime in 2024, espoused pan-Arabism.

== Decline ==
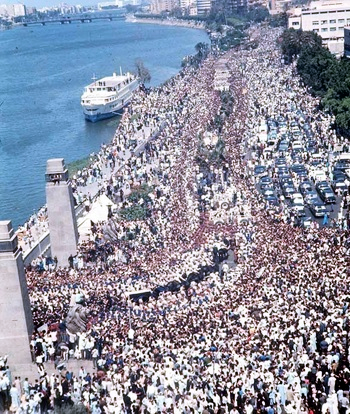
Nasser's funeral procession attended by five million mourners in Cairo, 1 October 1970

The decline of pan-Arabism is attributed to several factors. Problems persisted over a wide range of issues since the inception of pan-Arabist philosophy in the late 1800s, which, until its decline, had kept pan-Arabism on course for causal failure. The factors include: the promotion of pan-Islamism, sectarian and social differences within Arab societies; competition among Arab leaders to be the leading voice for the Arab and Islamic worlds; and, to a lesser extent, military defeats at the hands of an enemy force.

The promotion of pan-Islamism had been a key aspect within Arab and Muslim societies. Such philosophy dictated a united Islamic ummah or the close bonding of all Islamic communities to maintain and promote the essence of one family, one cause. The philosophy of pan-Arabism was in contradiction with that of pan-Islamism, as clarified by religious scholars and sheikhs across the various Arab countries, especially in the Persian Gulf. The belief held by critics emphasized that pan-Arabism separated itself from the ummah by promoting only Arab unity and ideals, not Islamic ones. The religious conservatism within the societies propelled pan-Islamism to defeat alternative perspectives, including pan-Arabism.

Various sectarian and social differences within Arab societies were another factor fueling pan-Arabism's decline. The sporadic Sunni and Shia religious divide, exacerbated by internal and foreign factors, prompted reconsideration within Arab circles as to whether pan-Arabism was viable, although the issue was religiously oriented. Social differences toed a similar line. Countries like Lebanon and Syria, considered secular, brought about a clash of thought with the likes of religious Saudi Arabia, whose longstanding promotion of religion was contradictory to the goals of the secular hierarchy within the two Levantine countries, for example.

Different Arab leaders competed to become the leading voices for the Arab and Islamic worlds. Such competition occasionally led to friction among the leaders of these Arab countries. The United Arab Republic, formulated by Egypt's Gamal Abdel Nasser and Syria's Shukri al-Quwatli, was intended to be the collective voice of the Arab world and the spearhead of pan-Arabism. As the only physical incarnation of pan-Arabism, it did not receive the expected praise from other Arab nations, especially in the Gulf, which further contributed to its decline.

To a lesser extent, the military defeat to "arch-enemy" Israel made both prominent sources of pan-Arabism reconsider such philosophy. The United Arab Republic, consisting of Egypt and Syria, bore the ideological burden of the unfavorable outcome, thereby putting pan-Arabism in question. The victory of Israel in the 1967 Six-Day War and the inability of Egypt and Syria to generate economic growth in some form also damaged pan-Arabism's credibility. "By the mid-1970s," according to The Continuum Political Encyclopedia of the Middle East, "the idea of Arab unity became less and less apparent in Arab politics, though it remained a wishful goal among the masses."

By the late 1980s, pan-Arabism began to be eclipsed by both nationalist and Islamist ideologies. Although pan-Arabism lost appeal by the 1990s, it continued to exercise an intellectual hegemony throughout the Arab world.

== See also ==
- Ba'athism
- Biladol Orb Awtani
- Pan-Africanism
- Pan-Iranism
- Pan-Islamism
- Pan-Semitism
- Pan-Turkism
