= National Union (United Arab Republic) =

National Union الاتحاد القومي
- General Secretary: Anwar Sadat (1957–1959); Kamal el-Din Hussein (1959–1962)
- Chairman: Gamal Abdel Nasser
- Founded: 28 May 1957 (Note: Per Presidential Decree 481, "Formation of the National Union to achieve the goals of the July Revolution". Permanent organisational structures and the appointment of the first General Secretary did not occur until early November 1957.)
- Dissolved: 1962
- Preceded by: Liberation Rally
- Succeeded by: Arab Socialist Union
- Headquarters: Cairo, Egypt
- Ideology: Arab nationalism Arab socialism Pan-Arabism; Nasserism; Anti-Zionism; Anti-Ikhwanism; Republicanism; Anti-communism
- Political position: Left-wing
- Colors: Red; White; Black

Party flag

The National Union (Arabic: الاتحاد القومي al-Ittihâd al-Kawmi) was the only permitted party in the United Arab Republic, the political union between Egypt and Syria that existed from 1957 to 1962.

== History ==
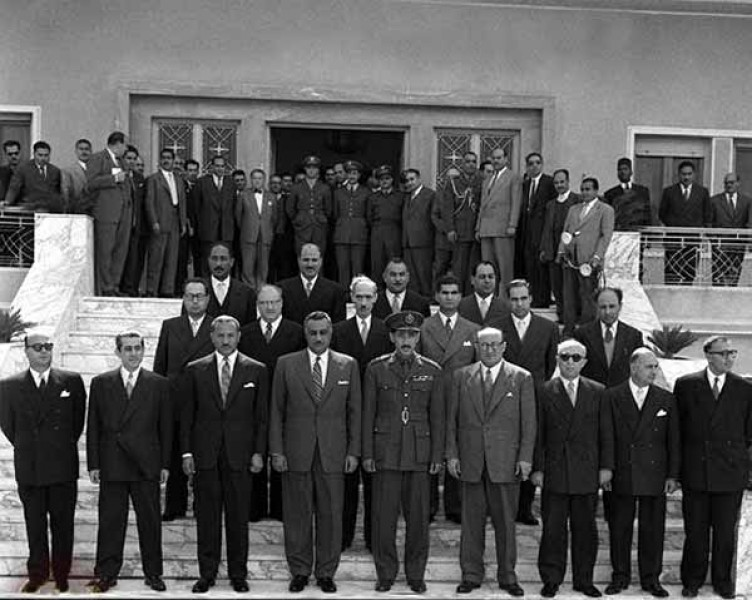
President Nasser with prominent members of the National Union and Ba'ath Parties

The National Union was founded by a presidential decree in Egypt in May 1957 by President Gamal Abdel Nasser as a successor to the Liberation Rally, with its permanent functions in effect from November 1957, shortly before the founding of the United Arab Republic. After the formation of the UAR in 1958, the National Union also became the only legal political movement in Syria. In the latter country, the National Union was controlled by former Ba'athists and anti-communists.

The main objective of the National Union was to mobilize the population behind Nasser's policies, which consisted of pan-Arabism, reforms and the building of a welfare state. However, the National Union did not become a real mass movement, certainly not in Syria. The latter country withdrew from the UAR in September 1961. In 1962 Nasser replaced the National Union with the Arab Socialist Union (ASU).

== Electoral history ==
=== People's Assembly of Egypt elections ===
Election	Party leader	Votes	%	Seats	+/–	Position	Result
1957	Gamal Abdel Nasser		100%	350 / 350	▲350	▲1st	Sole legal party
