= Gamal Abdel Nasser =

President of Egypt from 1956 to 1970

His Excellency Gamal Abdel Nasser
- جمال عبد الناصر
- Nasser in 1962

2nd President of Egypt
- In office 14 November 1954 (Note: Acting: 14 November 1954 – 23 June 1956) – 28 September 1970
- Prime Minister: See list: Himself; Ali Sabri; Zakaria Mohieddin; Mohamed Sedki Sulayman; Himself
- Vice President: See list: Sabri al-Asali (1958); Akram al-Hawrani (1958–1960); Abdel Latif Boghdadi (1958–1964); Abdel Hakim Amer (1958–1965); Nureddin Kuhala (1960–1961); Abdel Hamid al-Sarraj (1961); Kamal el-Din Hussein (1961–1964); Zakaria Mohieddin (1961–1964, 1965–1968); Hussein el-Shafei (1961–1965, 1968–1970); Anwar Sadat (1964, 1969–1970); Hassan Ibrahim (1964–1966); Ali Sabri (1965–1968)
- Preceded by: Mohamed Naguib
- Succeeded by: Anwar Sadat

31st Prime Minister of Egypt
- In office 19 June 1967 – 28 September 1970
- President: Himself
- Preceded by: Mohamed Sedki Sulayman
- Succeeded by: Mahmoud Fawzi
- In office 18 April 1954 – 29 September 1962
- President: Mohamed Naguib; Himself
- Preceded by: Mohamed Naguib
- Succeeded by: Ali Sabri
- In office 25 February 1954 – 8 March 1954
- President: Mohamed Naguib
- Preceded by: Mohamed Naguib
- Succeeded by: Mohamed Naguib
Other offices
Deputy Prime Minister of Egypt
In office 8 March 1954 – 18 April 1954
Prime Minister	Mohamed Naguib
Preceded by	Gamal Salem
Succeeded by	Gamal Salem
In office 18 June 1953 – 25 February 1954
Prime Minister	Mohamed Naguib
Preceded by	Sulayman Hafez
Succeeded by	Gamal Salem
Minister of the Interior
In office 18 June 1953 – 25 February 1954
Prime Minister	Mohamed Naguib
Preceded by	Sulayman Hafez
Succeeded by	Zakaria Mohieddin
Chairman of the Revolutionary Command Council
In office 14 November 1954 – 23 June 1956
Preceded by	Mohamed Naguib
Succeeded by	Himself (as President)
2nd Secretary-General of the Non-Aligned Movement
In office 5 October 1964 – 8 September 1970
Preceded by	Josip Broz Tito
Succeeded by	Kenneth Kaunda
Chairman of the Organisation of African Unity
In office 17 July 1964 – 21 October 1965
Preceded by	Haile Selassie
Succeeded by	Kwame Nkrumah

Personal details
- Born: Gamal Abdel Nasser Hussein; 15 January 1918 Alexandria, Sultanate of Egypt
- Died: 28 September 1970 (aged 52) Cairo, United Arab Republic
- Resting place: Gamal Abdel Nasser Mosque
- Party: Arab Socialist Union
- Other political affiliations: National Union; Liberation Rally; Young Egypt Party
- Spouse: Tahia Kazem (m. 1944)
- Children: 5, including Khalid, Abdel Hakim, and Hoda
- Parent: Abdel Nasser Hussein (father)
- Relatives: Al-Leithi Abdel Nasser (brother); Tarek Abdel Nasser (brother); Aida Abdel Nasser (sister)
- Profession: Military officer; politician

Military service
- Allegiance: Kingdom of Egypt; Republic of Egypt; United Arab Republic
- Branch/service: Egyptian Armed Forces
- Years of service: 1938–1952
- Rank: Lieutenant colonel
- Battles/wars: 1948 Arab–Israeli War
- Nasser's voice Nasser's announcement of formation of the United Arab Republic; Recorded 23 February 1958

Gamal Abdel Nasser Hussein (Note: English pronunciation: UK: /ɡəˈmɑːl ˌæbdɛl ˈnɑːsər, - ˈnæsər/, US: /- ˌɑːbdəl -/; Arabic: جمال عبد الناصر حسين, romanized: Jamāl ʿAbd al-Nāṣir Ḥusayn, Egyptian Arabic pronunciation: [ɡæˈmæːl ʕæbdenˈnɑːsˤeɾ ħeˈseːn].) (15 January 1918 – 28 September 1970) was an Egyptian military officer and revolutionary who served as the second president of Egypt from 1954 until his death in 1970. Nasser led the Egyptian revolution of 1952 and introduced far-reaching land reforms the following year. Following a 1954 assassination attempt by a Muslim Brotherhood member, he cracked down on the organization, put President Mohamed Naguib under house arrest and assumed executive office. He was formally elected president in June 1956.

Nasser's popularity in Egypt and the Arab world skyrocketed after his nationalization of the Suez Canal and his political victory in the subsequent Suez Crisis, known in Egypt as the Tripartite Aggression. Calls for pan-Arab unity under his leadership increased, culminating with the formation of the United Arab Republic with Syria from 1958 to 1961. In 1962, Nasser began a series of major socialist measures and modernization reforms in Egypt. Despite setbacks to his pan-Arabist cause, by 1963 Nasser's supporters gained power in several Arab countries, but he became embroiled in the North Yemen Civil War, and eventually the much larger Arab Cold War. He began his third presidential term in March 1965 after his political opponents were banned from running. Following Egypt's defeat by Israel in the Six-Day War of 1967, Nasser resigned, but he returned to office after popular demonstrations called for his reinstatement. By 1968, Nasser had appointed himself prime minister, launched the War of Attrition to regain the Israeli-occupied Sinai Peninsula, begun a process of depoliticizing the military, and issued a set of political liberalization reforms. After the conclusion of the 1970 Arab League summit, Nasser suffered a heart attack and died. His funeral in Cairo drew five to six million mourners, and prompted an outpouring of grief across the Arab world.

Nasser remains an iconic figure in the Arab world, particularly for his strides towards social justice and Arab unity, his modernization policies, and his anti-imperialist efforts. His presidency also encouraged and coincided with an Egyptian cultural boom, and the launching of large industrial projects, including the Aswan Dam, and Helwan city. Nasser's detractors criticize his authoritarianism, human rights violations, antisemitism and anti-Zionism, and the dominance of the military over civil institutions that characterised his tenure—an anti-democratic framework which has persisted to the present.

== Early life ==
Gamal Abdel Nasser Hussein was born in Bakos, Alexandria, Egypt on 15 January 1918, a year before the tumultuous events of the Egyptian Revolution of 1919. Nasser's father, Abdel Nasser Hussein, was a postal worker born in Beni Mur in Upper Egypt, and raised in Alexandria. His mother Fahima Hammad was born in the village of Bani Murr, the daughter of a coal trader. Her family came from Mallawi, el-Minya. His parents had married in 1917. Nasser had two brothers, Izz al-Arab and al-Leithi, and a sister, Aida. Nasser's biographers Robert Stephens and Said Aburish wrote that Nasser's family believed strongly in the "Arab notion of glory", since the name of Nasser's brother, Izz al-Arab, translates to "Glory of the Arabs".

Nasser's family traveled frequently due to his father's work. In 1921, they moved to Asyut and, in 1923, to Khatatba, where Nasser's father ran a post office. Nasser attended a primary school for the children of railway employees until 1924, when he was sent to live with his paternal uncle in Cairo, and to attend the Nahhasin elementary school.

Nasser exchanged letters with his mother and visited her on holidays. He stopped receiving messages at the end of April 1926. Upon returning to Khatatba, he learned that his mother had died after giving birth to his third brother, Shawki, and that his family had kept the news from him. Nasser later stated that "losing her this way was a shock so deep that time failed to remedy". He adored his mother and the injury of her death deepened when his father remarried before the year's end.

In 1928, Nasser went to Alexandria to live with his maternal grandfather and attend the city's Attarin elementary school. He left in 1929 for a private boarding school in Helwan, and later returned to Alexandria to enter the Ras el-Tin secondary school and to join his father, who was working for the city's postal service. It was in Alexandria that Nasser became involved in political activism. After witnessing clashes between protesters and police in Manshia Square, he joined the demonstration without being aware of its purpose. The protest, organized by the ultranationalist Young Egypt Society, called for the end of colonialism in Egypt in the wake of the 1923 Egyptian constitution's annulment by Prime Minister Isma'il Sidqi. Nasser was arrested and detained for a night before his father bailed him out. Nasser joined the paramilitary wing of the group, known as the Green Shirts, for a brief period in 1934. His association with the group and active role in student demonstrations during this period "imbued him with a fierce Egyptian nationalism", according to the historian James Jankowski.

When his father was transferred to Cairo in 1933, Nasser joined him and attended al-Nahda al-Masria school. He took up acting in school plays for a brief period and wrote articles for the school's paper, including a piece on French philosopher Voltaire titled "Voltaire, the Man of Freedom". On 13 November 1935, Nasser led a student demonstration against British rule, protesting against a statement made four days prior by UK foreign minister Samuel Hoare that rejected prospects for the 1923 Constitution's restoration. Two protesters were killed and Nasser received a graze to the head from a policeman's bullet. The incident garnered his first mention in the press: the nationalist newspaper Al Gihad reported that Nasser led the protest and was among the wounded. On 12 December, the new king, Farouk, issued a decree restoring the constitution.

Nasser's involvement in political activity increased throughout his school years, such that he only attended 45 days of classes during his last year of secondary school. Despite it having the almost unanimous backing of Egypt's political forces, Nasser strongly objected to the 1936 Anglo-Egyptian Treaty because it stipulated the continued presence of British military bases in the country. Nonetheless, political unrest in Egypt declined significantly and Nasser resumed his studies at al-Nahda, where he received his leaving certificate later that year.

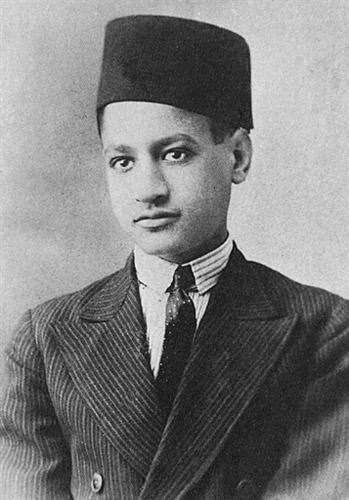
Nasser in 1931

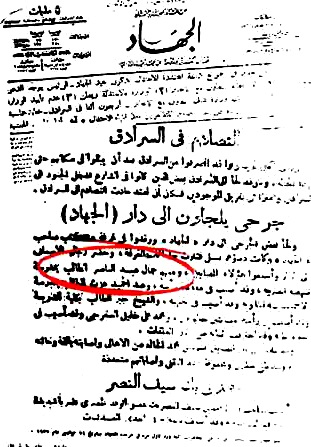
Nasser's name circled in Al-Gihad

=== Early influences ===
Aburish asserts that Nasser was not distressed by his frequent relocations, which broadened his horizons and showed him Egyptian society's class divisions. His own social status was well below the wealthy Egyptian elite, and his discontent with those born into wealth and power grew throughout his lifetime. Nasser spent most of his spare time reading, particularly in 1933, when he lived near the National Library of Egypt. He read the Qur'an, the sayings of Muhammad, the lives of the Sahaba (Muhammad's companions), the biographies of nationalist leaders Napoleon, Atatürk, Otto von Bismarck and Garibaldi, and the autobiography of Winston Churchill.

Nasser was greatly influenced by Egyptian nationalism, as espoused by politician Mustafa Kamel, poet Ahmed Shawqi, and his anti-colonialist instructor at the Royal Military Academy, Aziz al-Masri, to whom Nasser expressed his gratitude in a 1961 newspaper interview. He was especially influenced by Egyptian writer Tawfiq al-Hakim's novel Return of the Spirit, in which al-Hakim wrote that the Egyptian people were only in need of a "man in whom all their feelings and desires will be represented, and who will be for them a symbol of their objective". Nasser later credited the novel as his inspiration to launch the coup d'état that began the Egyptian Revolution of 1952.

== Military career ==
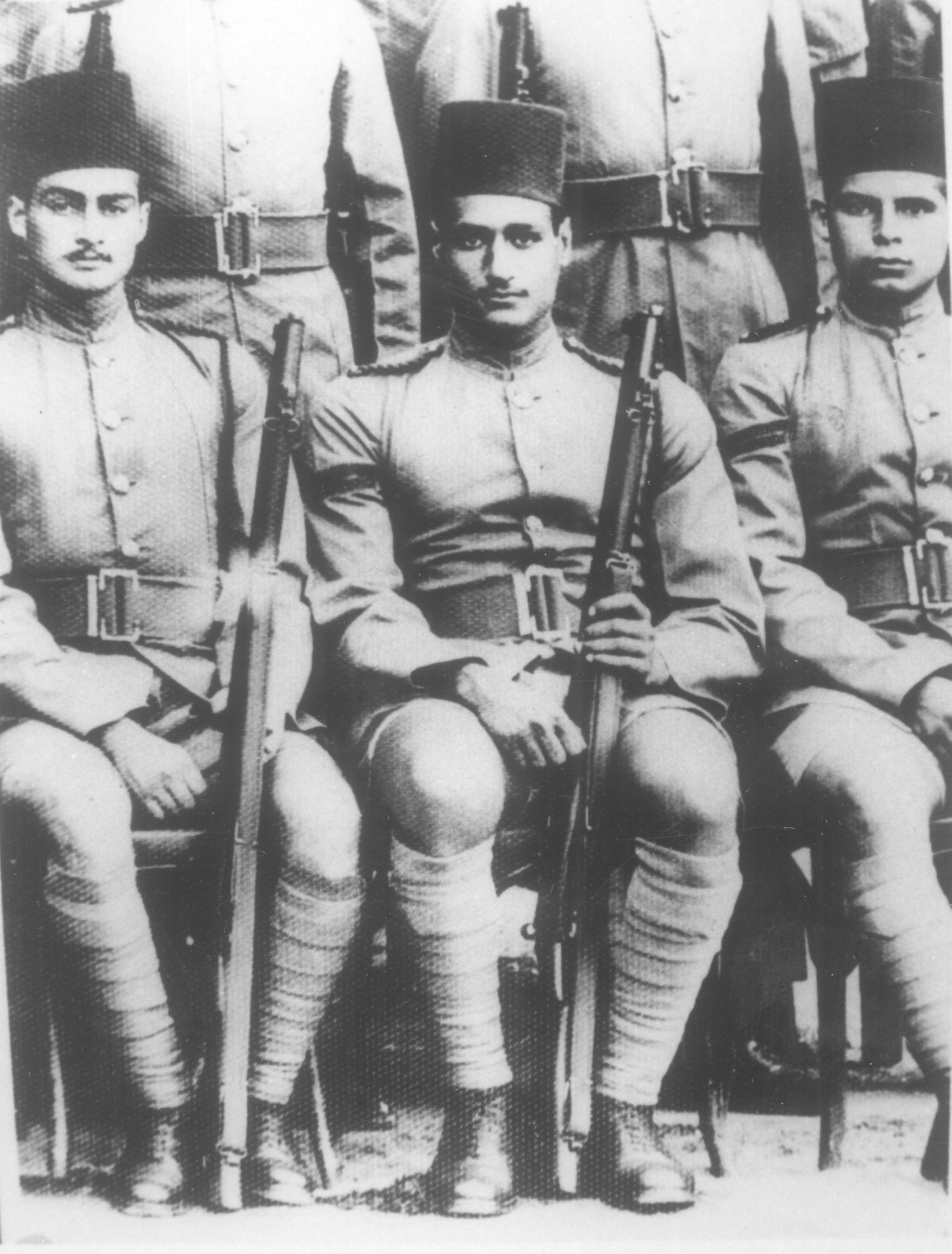
Nasser (center) with Ahmed Mazhar (left) in army, 1940

In 1937, Nasser applied to the Royal Military Academy for army officer training, but his police record of anti-government protest initially blocked his entry. Disappointed, he enrolled in the law school at King Fuad University, but quit after one semester to reapply to the Military Academy. From his readings, Nasser, who frequently spoke of "dignity, glory, and freedom" in his youth, became enchanted with the stories of national liberators and heroic conquerors; a military career became his chief priority.

Convinced that he needed a wasta, or an influential intermediary to promote his application above the others, Nasser managed to secure a meeting with Under-Secretary of War Ibrahim Khairy Pasha, the person responsible for the academy's selection board, and requested his help. Khairy Pasha agreed and sponsored Nasser's second application, which was accepted in late 1937. Nasser focused on his military career from then on, and had little contact with his family. At the academy, he met Abdel Hakim Amer and Anwar Sadat, both of whom became important aides during his presidency. After graduating from the academy in July 1938, he was commissioned a second lieutenant in the infantry, and posted to Mankabad. It was here that Nasser and his closest comrades, including Sadat and Amer, first discussed their dissatisfaction at widespread corruption in the country and their desire to topple the monarchy. Sadat would later write that because of his "energy, clear-thinking, and balanced judgement", Nasser emerged as the group's natural leader.

In 1941, Nasser was posted to Khartoum, Sudan, which was part of Egypt at the time. Nasser returned to Egypt in September 1942 after a brief stay in Sudan, then secured a position as an instructor in the Cairo Royal Military Academy in May 1943. In February 1942, in what became known as the Abdeen Palace Incident, British troops surrounded Farouk's palace to compel him to dismiss Prime Minister Hussein Sirri Pasha in favour of Mostafa El-Nahas, whom Britain felt would be more sympathetic to its war effort. The British ambassador, Miles Lampson, marched into the palace and confronted the King, stating that he would be forced to abdicate and sent into exile unless he dismissed Pasha. Ultimately, Farouk submitted, and appointed El-Nahas as Prime Minister. Nasser saw the incident as a blatant violation of Egyptian sovereignty and wrote, "I am ashamed that our army has not reacted against this attack", and wished for "calamity" to overtake the British. Nasser was accepted into the General Staff College later that year. He began to form a group of young military officers with strong nationalist sentiments who supported some form of revolution. Nasser stayed in touch with the group's members primarily through Amer, who continued to seek out interested officers within the Egyptian Armed Force's various branches and presented Nasser with a complete file on each of them.

=== 1948 Arab–Israeli War ===
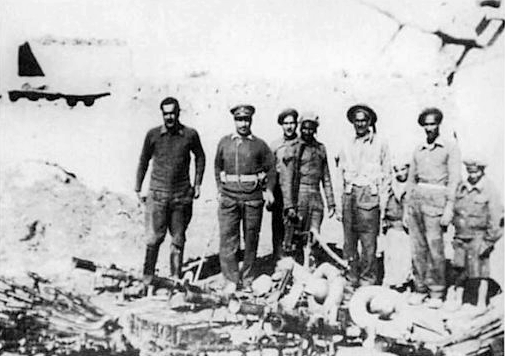
Nasser (first from left) with his unit in the Faluja pocket, displaying weapons captured from the Israeli Army during the 1948 war.

Nasser's first battlefield experience was in Palestine during the 1948 Arab–Israeli War. He initially volunteered to serve with the Arab Higher Committee (AHC) led by Mohammad Amin al-Husayni. Nasser met with and impressed al-Husayni, but was ultimately refused entry to the AHC's forces by the Egyptian government for reasons that were unclear.

In May 1948, following the British withdrawal, King Farouk sent the Egyptian army into Israel, with Nasser serving as a staff officer of the 6th Infantry Battalion. During the war, he wrote of the Egyptian army's unpreparedness, saying "our soldiers were dashed against fortifications". Nasser was deputy commander of the Egyptian forces that secured the Faluja pocket (commanded by Said Taha Bey nicknamed the "Sudanese tiger" by the Israelis). On 12 July, he was lightly wounded in the fighting. By August, his brigade was surrounded by the Israeli Army. Appeals for help from Transjordan's Arab Legion went unheeded, but the brigade refused to surrender. Negotiations between Israel and Egypt finally resulted in the ceding of Faluja to Israel. According to veteran journalist Eric Margolis, the defenders of Faluja, "including young army officer Gamal Abdel Nasser, became national heroes" for enduring Israeli bombardment while isolated from their command.

Still stationed after the war in the Faluja enclave, Nasser agreed to an Israeli request to identify 67 killed soldiers of the "religious platoon". The expedition was led by Rabbi Shlomo Goren and Nasser personally accompanied him, ordering the Egyptian soldiers to stand at attention. They spoke briefly, and according to Goren, after learning what the square phylacteries found with the soldiers were, Nasser told him that he "now understands their courageous stand". During an interview on Israeli TV in 1971, Rabbi Goren claimed the two agreed to meet again when the time of peace comes.

The Egyptian singer Umm Kulthum hosted a public celebration for the officers' return despite reservations from the royal government, which had been under British pressure to prevent the reception. The apparent difference in attitude between the government and the general public increased Nasser's determination to topple the monarchy. Nasser had also felt bitter that his brigade had not been relieved despite the resilience it displayed. He started writing his book Philosophy of the Revolution during the siege.

After the war, Nasser returned to his role as an instructor at the Royal Military Academy. He sent emissaries to forge an alliance with the Muslim Brotherhood in October 1948, but soon concluded that the religious agenda of the Brotherhood was not compatible with his nationalism. From then on, Nasser prevented the Brotherhood's influence over his cadres' activities without severing ties with the organization. Nasser was sent as a member of the Egyptian delegation to Rhodes in February 1949 to negotiate a formal armistice with Israel, and reportedly considered the terms to be humiliating, particularly because the Israelis were able to easily occupy the Eilat region while negotiating with the Arabs in March.

== Revolution ==
=== Free Officers ===
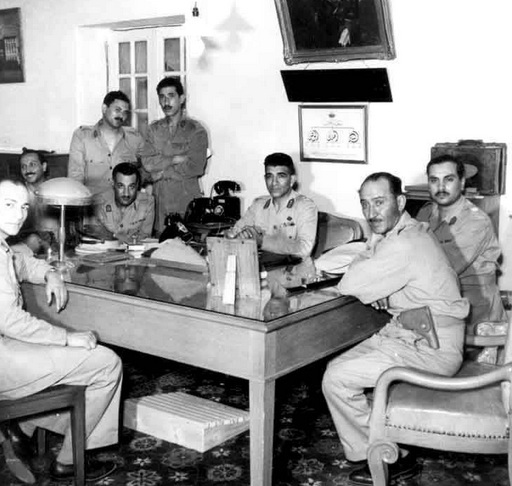
The Free Officers after the coup, 1953. Counterclockwise: Zakaria Mohieddin, Abdel Latif Boghdadi, Kamel el-Din Hussein (standing), Nasser (seated), Abdel Hakim Amer, Mohamed Naguib, Youssef Seddik, and Ahmad Shawki.

Nasser's return to Egypt coincided with Husni al-Za'im's Syrian coup d'état. Its success and evident popular support among the Syrian people encouraged Nasser's revolutionary pursuits. Soon after his return, he was summoned and interrogated by Prime Minister Ibrahim Abdel Hadi regarding suspicions that he was forming a secret group of dissenting officers. According to secondhand reports, Nasser convincingly denied the allegations. Abdel Hadi was also hesitant to take drastic measures against the army, especially in front of its chief of staff, who was present during the interrogation, and subsequently released Nasser. The interrogation pushed Nasser to speed up his group's activities.

After 1949, the group adopted the name "Association of Free Officers" and advocated "little else but freedom and the restoration of their country's dignity". Nasser organized the Free Officers' founding committee, which eventually comprised fourteen men from different social and political backgrounds, including representation from Young Egypt, the Muslim Brotherhood, the Egyptian Communist Party, and the aristocracy. Nasser was unanimously elected chairman of the organization.

In the 1950 parliamentary elections, the Wafd Party of el-Nahhas gained a victory—mostly due to the absence of the Muslim Brotherhood, which boycotted the elections—and was perceived as a threat by the Free Officers as the Wafd had campaigned on demands similar to their own. Accusations of corruption against Wafd politicians began to surface, however, breeding an atmosphere of rumor and suspicion that consequently brought the Free Officers to the forefront of Egyptian politics. By then, the organization had expanded to around ninety members. According to Khaled Mohieddin, "nobody knew all of them and where they belonged in the hierarchy except Nasser". Nasser felt that the Free Officers were not ready to move against the government and, for nearly two years, he did little beyond officer recruitment and underground news bulletins.

On 11 October 1951, the Wafd government abrogated the unpopular Anglo-Egyptian Treaty of 1936 by which the United Kingdom had the right to maintain its military forces in the Suez Canal Zone. The popularity of this move, as well as that of government-sponsored guerrilla attacks against the British, put pressure on Nasser to act. According to Sadat, Nasser decided to wage "a large scale assassination campaign". In January 1952, he and Hassan Ibrahim attempted to kill the royalist general Hussein Sirri Amer by firing their submachine guns at his car as he drove through the streets of Cairo. Instead of killing the general, the attackers wounded an innocent female passerby. Nasser recalled that her wails "haunted" him and firmly dissuaded him from undertaking similar actions in the future.

Sirri Amer was close to King Farouk, and was nominated for the presidency of the Officer's Club—normally a ceremonial office—with the king's backing. Nasser was determined to establish the independence of the army from the monarchy, and with Amer as the intercessor, resolved to field a nominee for the Free Officers. They selected Mohamed Naguib, a popular general who had offered his resignation to Farouk in 1942 over British high-handedness and was wounded three times in the Palestine War. Naguib won overwhelmingly and the Free Officers, through their connection with a leading Egyptian daily, al-Misri, publicized his victory while praising the nationalistic spirit of the army.

=== Revolution of 1952 ===
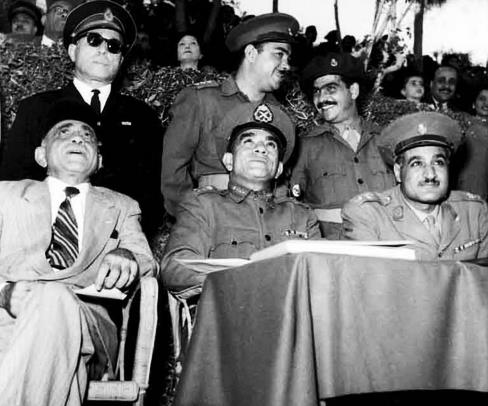
Leaders of Egypt following the ouster of King Farouk, November 1952. Seated, left to right: Sulayman Hafez, Mohamed Naguib and Nasser

On 25 January 1952, at a time of growing fedayeen attacks on British forces occupying the Suez Canal Zone, some 7,000 British soldiers attacked the main police station in the Canal city Ismailia. In the ensuing battle, which lasted two hours, 50 Egyptian policeman were killed, sparking outrage across Egypt, and the Cairo Fire riots which left 76 people dead. Afterwards, Nasser published a simple six-point program in Rose al-Yūsuf to dismantle feudalism and British influence in Egypt. In May, Nasser received word that Farouk knew the names of the Free Officers and intended to arrest them; he immediately entrusted Free Officer Zakaria Mohieddin with the task of planning the government takeover by army units loyal to the association.

The Free Officers' intention was not to install themselves in government, but to re-establish a parliamentary democracy. Nasser did not believe that a low-ranking officer like himself (a lieutenant colonel) would be accepted by the Egyptian people, and so selected General Naguib to be his "boss" and lead the coup in name. The revolution they had long sought was launched on 22 July and was declared a success the next day. The Free Officers seized control of all government buildings, radio stations, and police stations, as well as army headquarters in Cairo. While many of the rebel officers were leading their units, Nasser donned civilian clothing to avoid detection by royalists and moved around Cairo monitoring the situation. In a move to stave off foreign intervention two days before the revolution, Nasser had notified the American and British governments of his intentions, and both had agreed not to aid Farouk. Under pressure from the Americans, Nasser had agreed to exile the deposed king with an honorary ceremony.

On 18 June 1953, the monarchy was abolished and the Republic of Egypt declared, with Naguib as its first president. According to Aburish, after assuming power, Nasser and the Free Officers expected to become the "guardians of the people's interests" against the monarchy and the pasha class while leaving the day-to-day tasks of government to civilians. They asked former prime minister Ali Maher to accept reappointment to his previous position, and to form an all-civilian cabinet. The Free Officers then governed as the Revolutionary Command Council (RCC) with Naguib as chairman and Nasser as vice-chairman. Relations between the RCC and Maher grew tense, however, as the latter viewed many of Nasser's schemes—agrarian reform, abolition of the monarchy, reorganization of political parties—as too radical, culminating in Maher's resignation on 7 September. Naguib assumed the additional role of prime minister, and Nasser that of deputy prime minister. In September, the Agrarian Reform Law was put into effect. In Nasser's eyes, this law gave the RCC its own identity and transformed the coup into a revolution.

Preceding the reform law, in August 1952, communist-led riots broke out at textile factories in Kafr el-Dawwar, leading to a clash with the army that left nine people dead. While most of the RCC insisted on executing the riot's two ringleaders, Nasser opposed this. Nonetheless, the sentences were carried out. The Muslim Brotherhood supported the RCC, and after Naguib's assumption of power, demanded four ministerial portfolios in the new cabinet. Nasser turned down their demands and instead hoped to co-opt the Brotherhood by giving two of its members, who were willing to serve officially as independents, minor ministerial posts.

== Road to presidency ==
=== Disputes with Naguib ===
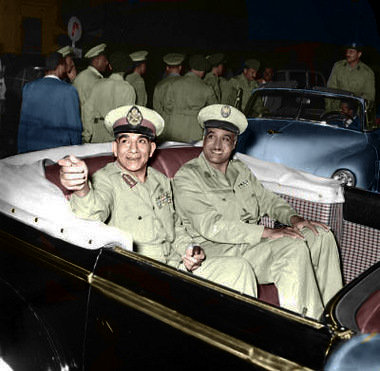
Nasser (right) and Mohamed Naguib (left) during celebrations marking the second anniversary of the 1952 revolution, July 1954

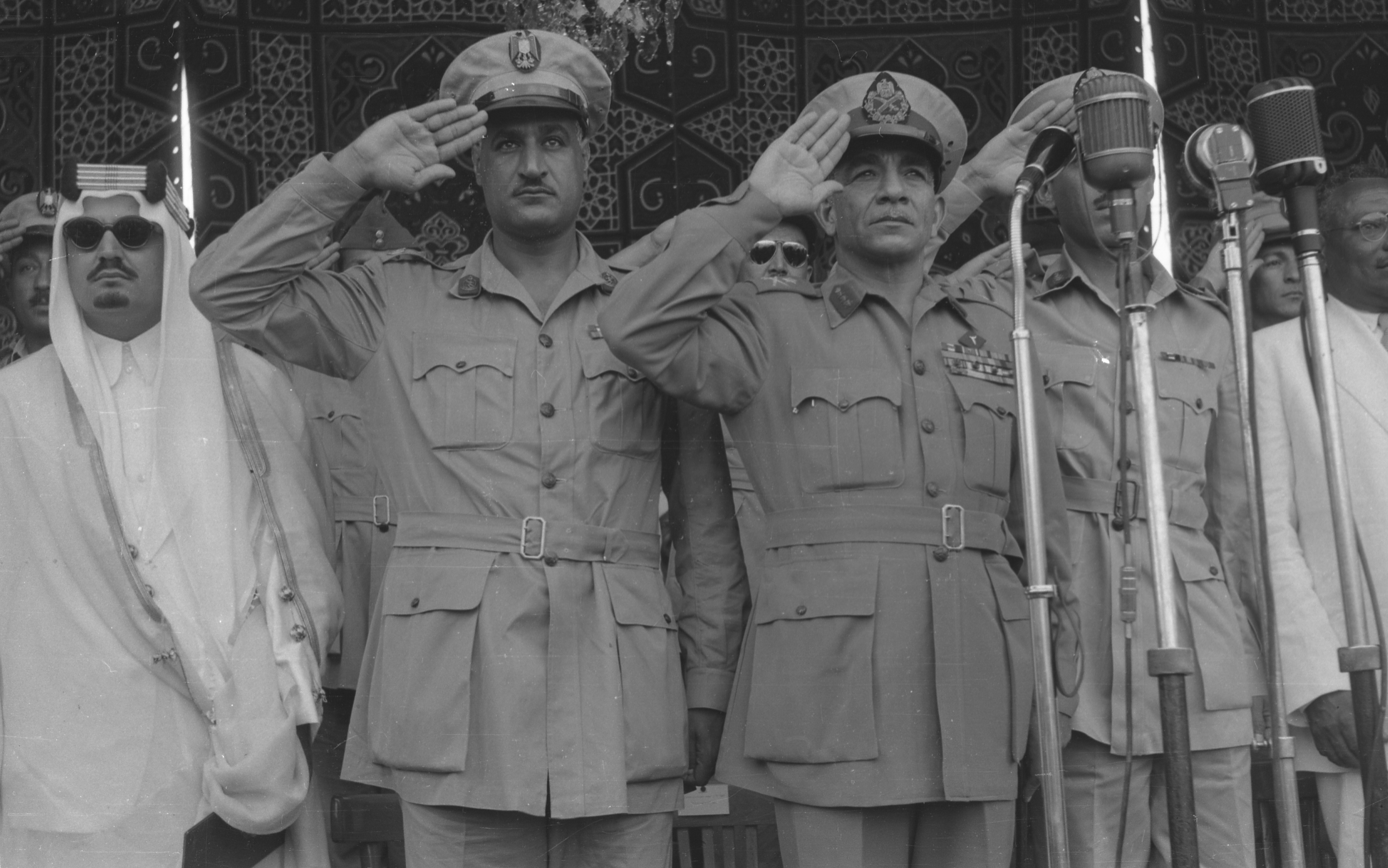
Nasser and Naguib saluting at the opening of the Suez Canal

Nasser laughing at the Muslim Brotherhood for suggesting in 1953 that women should be required to wear the hijab and that Islamic law should be enforced across the country.

In January 1953, Nasser overcame opposition from Naguib and banned all political parties, creating a one-party system under the Liberation Rally, a loosely structured movement whose chief task was to organize pro-RCC rallies and lectures, with Nasser its secretary-general. Despite the dissolution order, Nasser was the only RCC member who still favored holding parliamentary elections, according to his fellow officer Abdel Latif Boghdadi. Although outvoted, he still advocated holding elections by 1956. In March 1953, Nasser led the Egyptian delegation negotiating a British withdrawal from the Suez Canal.

When Naguib began showing signs of independence from Nasser by distancing himself from the RCC's land reform decrees and drawing closer to Egypt's established political forces, namely the Wafd and the Brotherhood, Nasser resolved to depose him. In June, Nasser took control of the interior ministry post from Naguib loyalist Sulayman Hafez, and pressured Naguib to conclude the abolition of the monarchy.

On 25 February 1954, Naguib announced his resignation after the RCC held an official meeting without his presence two days prior. On 26 February, Nasser accepted the resignation, put Naguib under house arrest, and the RCC proclaimed Nasser as both RCC chairman and prime minister. As Naguib intended, a mutiny immediately followed, demanding Naguib's reinstatement and the RCC's dissolution. While visiting the striking officers at Military Headquarters (GHQ) to call for the mutiny's end, Nasser was initially intimidated into accepting their demands. However, on 27 February, Nasser's supporters in the army launched a raid on the GHQ, ending the mutiny. Later that day, hundreds of thousands of protesters, mainly belonging to the Brotherhood, called for Naguib's return and Nasser's imprisonment. In response, a sizable group within the RCC, led by Khaled Mohieddin, demanded Naguib's release and return to the presidency. Nasser acquiesced, but delayed Naguib's reinstatement until 4 March, allowing him to promote Amer to Commander of the Armed Forces—a position formerly occupied by Naguib.

On 5 March, Nasser's security coterie arrested thousands of participants in the uprising. As a ruse to rally opposition against a return to the pre-1952 order, the RCC decreed an end to restrictions on monarchy-era parties and the Free Officers' withdrawal from politics. The RCC succeeded in provoking the beneficiaries of the revolution, namely the workers, peasants, and petty bourgeois, to oppose the decrees, with one million transport workers launching a strike and thousands of peasants entering Cairo in protest in late March. Naguib sought to crack down on the protesters, but his requests were rebuffed by the heads of the security forces. On 29 March, Nasser announced the decrees' revocation in response to the "impulse of the street". Between April and June, hundreds of Naguib's supporters in the military were either arrested or dismissed, and Mohieddin was informally exiled to Switzerland to represent the RCC abroad. King Saud of Saudi Arabia attempted to mend relations between Nasser and Naguib, but to no avail.

=== Assuming chairmanship of RCC ===
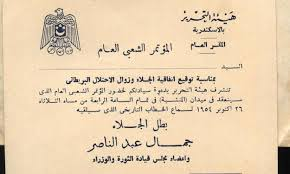
Liberation organization in Alexandria invitation to Nasser speech 26 October 1954

Sound recording of the assassination attempt
With English subtitles

On 26 October 1954, Muslim Brotherhood member Mahmoud Abdel-Latif attempted to assassinate Nasser while he was delivering a speech in Alexandria, broadcast to the Arab world by radio, to celebrate the British military withdrawal. The gunman was 25 feet (7.6 m) away from him and fired eight shots, but all missed Nasser. Panic broke out in the mass audience, but Nasser maintained his posture and raised his voice to appeal for calm. With great emotion he exclaimed the following:

My countrymen, my blood spills for you and for Egypt. I will live for your sake and die for the sake of your freedom and honor. Let them kill me; it does not concern me so long as I have instilled pride, honor, and freedom in you. If Gamal Abdel Nasser should die, each of you shall be Gamal Abdel Nasser ... Gamal Abdel Nasser is of you and from you and he is willing to sacrifice his life for the nation.

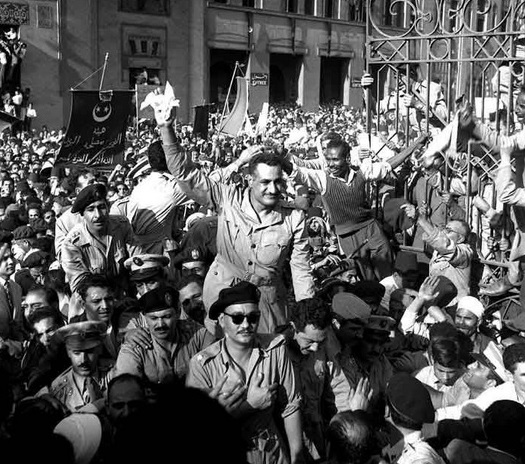
Nasser greeted by crowds in Alexandria one day after his announcement of the British withdrawal and the assassination attempt against him, 27 October 1954.

The crowd roared in approval and Arab audiences were electrified. The assassination attempt backfired, quickly playing into Nasser's hands. Upon returning to Cairo, he ordered one of the largest political crackdowns in the modern history of Egypt, with the arrests of thousands of dissenters, mostly members of the Brotherhood, but also communists, and the dismissal of 140 officers loyal to Naguib. Eight Brotherhood leaders were sentenced to death, although the sentence of its chief ideologue, Sayyid Qutb, was commuted to a 15-year imprisonment. Naguib was removed from the presidency and put under house arrest, but was never tried or sentenced, and no one in the army rose to defend him. With his rivals neutralized, Nasser became the undisputed leader of Egypt.

Nasser's street following was still too small to sustain his plans for reform and to secure him in office. To promote himself and the Liberation Rally, he gave speeches in a cross-country tour, and imposed controls over the country's press by decreeing that all publications had to be approved by the party to prevent "sedition". Both Umm Kulthum and Abdel Halim Hafez, the leading Arab singers of the era, performed songs praising Nasser's nationalism. Others produced plays denigrating his political opponents. According to his associates, Nasser orchestrated the campaign himself. Arab nationalist terms such "Arab homeland" and "Arab nation" frequently began appearing in his speeches in 1954–55, whereas prior he would refer to the Arab "peoples" or the "Arab region". In January 1955, the RCC appointed him as their president, pending national elections.

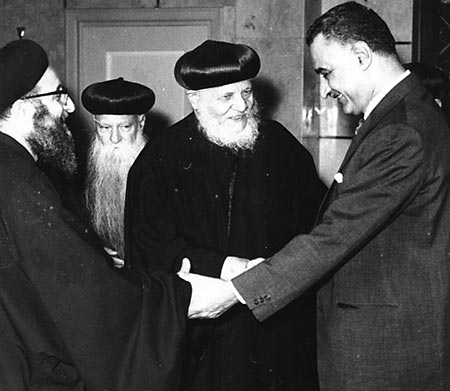
President Nasser receives a delegation of Christian bishops from Dakahlia, Qena, Qus and Sohag (1965)

Nasser made secret contacts with Israel in 1954–55, but determined that peace with Israel would be impossible, considering it an "expansionist state that viewed the Arabs with disdain". On 28 February 1955, Israeli troops attacked the Egyptian-held Gaza Strip with the stated aim of suppressing Palestinian fedayeen raids. Nasser did not feel that the Egyptian Army was ready for a confrontation and did not retaliate militarily. His failure to respond to Israeli military action demonstrated the ineffectiveness of his armed forces and constituted a blow to his growing popularity. Nasser subsequently ordered the tightening of the blockade on Israeli shipping through the Straits of Tiran and restricted the use of airspace over the Gulf of Aqaba by Israeli aircraft in early September. The Israelis re-militarized the al-Auja Demilitarized Zone on the Egyptian border on 21 September.

Simultaneous with Israel's February raid, the Baghdad Pact was formed between some regional allies of the UK. Nasser considered the Baghdad Pact a threat to his efforts to eliminate British military influence in the Middle East, and a mechanism to undermine the Arab League and "perpetuate [Arab] subservience to Zionism and [Western] imperialism". Nasser felt that if he was to maintain Egypt's regional leadership position he needed to acquire modern weaponry to arm his military. When it became apparent to him that Western countries would not supply Egypt under acceptable financial and military terms, Nasser turned to the Eastern Bloc and concluded a US$320,000,000 armaments agreement with Czechoslovakia on 27 September. Through the Czechoslovak arms deal, the balance of power between Egypt and Israel was more or less equalized and Nasser's role as the Arab leader defying the West was enhanced. The arms deal led to increased unease in the United States, where Nasser was compared to Benito Mussolini and Adolf Hitler, causing it to strengthen its relations with Israel and become more wary of Egypt as a result.

=== Adoption of neutralism ===
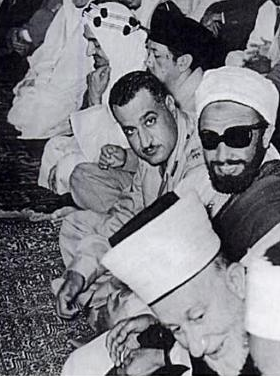
Nasser and Imam Ahmad of North Yemen facing the camera, Prince Faisal of Saudi Arabia in white robes in the background, Amin al-Husayni of the All-Palestine Government in the foreground at the Bandung Conference, April 1955

At the Bandung Conference in Indonesia in late April 1955, Nasser was treated as the leading representative of the Arab countries and was one of the most popular figures at the summit. He had paid earlier visits to Pakistan (9 April), India (14 April), Burma, and Afghanistan on the way to Bandung, and previously cemented a treaty of friendship with India in Cairo on 6 April, strengthening Egyptian–Indian relations on the international policy and economic development fronts.

Nasser mediated discussions between the pro-Western, pro-Soviet, and neutralist conference factions over the composition of the "Final Communique" addressing colonialism in Africa and Asia and the fostering of global peace amid the Cold War between the West and the Soviet Union. At Bandung, Nasser sought a proclamation for the avoidance of international defense alliances, support for the independence of Tunisia, Algeria, and Morocco from French rule, support for the Palestinian right of return, and the implementation of UN resolutions regarding the Arab–Israeli conflict. He succeeded in lobbying the attendees to pass resolutions on each of these issues, notably securing the strong support of China and India.

Following Bandung, Nasser officially adopted the "positive neutralism" of Yugoslavian president Josip Broz Tito and Indian Prime Minister Jawaharlal Nehru as a principal theme of Egyptian foreign policy regarding the Cold War. Nasser was welcomed by large crowds of people lining the streets of Cairo on his return to Egypt on 2 May and was widely heralded in the press for his achievements and leadership in the conference. Consequently, Nasser's prestige was greatly boosted, as was his self-confidence and image.

=== 1956 constitution and presidency ===
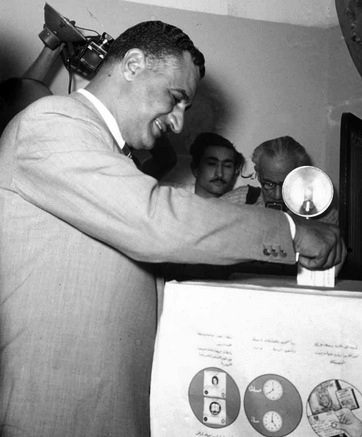
Nasser submitting his vote for the referendum of the proposed constitution, 23 June 1956

With his domestic position considerably strengthened, Nasser was able to secure primacy over his RCC colleagues and gained relatively unchallenged decision-making authority, particularly over foreign policy.

In January 1956, the new Constitution of Egypt was drafted, entailing the establishment of a single-party system under the National Union (NU), a movement Nasser described as the "cadre through which we will realize our revolution". The NU was a reconfiguration of the Liberation Rally, which Nasser determined had failed in generating mass public participation. In the new movement, Nasser attempted to incorporate more citizens, approved by local-level party committees, in order to solidify popular backing for his government. The NU would select a nominee for the presidential election whose name would be provided for public approval.

Nasser's nomination for the post and the new constitution were put to public referendum on 23 June, and each was approved with near-unanimous support. Historian Kirk J. Beatie wrote that while the results were likely falsified, it was also "impossible to know how accurate they were." A 350-member National Assembly was established, elections for which were held in July 1957. Nasser had ultimate approval over all the candidates. The constitution granted women's suffrage, prohibited discrimination by sex, and entailed special protection for women in the workplace. Coinciding with the new constitution and Nasser's presidency, the RCC dissolved itself and its members resigned their military commissions as part of the transition to civilian rule. During the deliberations surrounding the establishment of a new government, Nasser began a process of sidelining his rivals among the original Free Officers, while elevating his closest allies to high-ranking positions in the cabinet.

== Nationalization of the Suez Canal Company ==
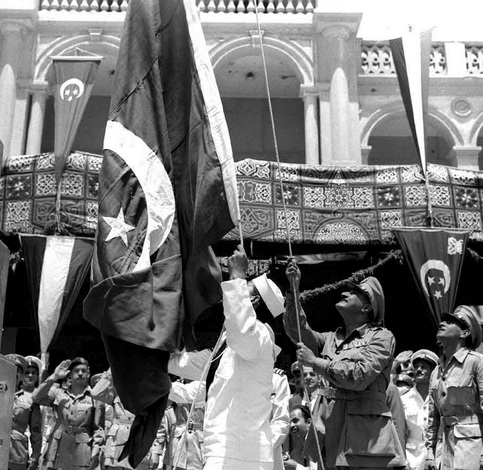
Nasser raising the Egyptian flag over the Suez Canal city of Port Said to celebrate the final British military withdrawal from the country, June 1956

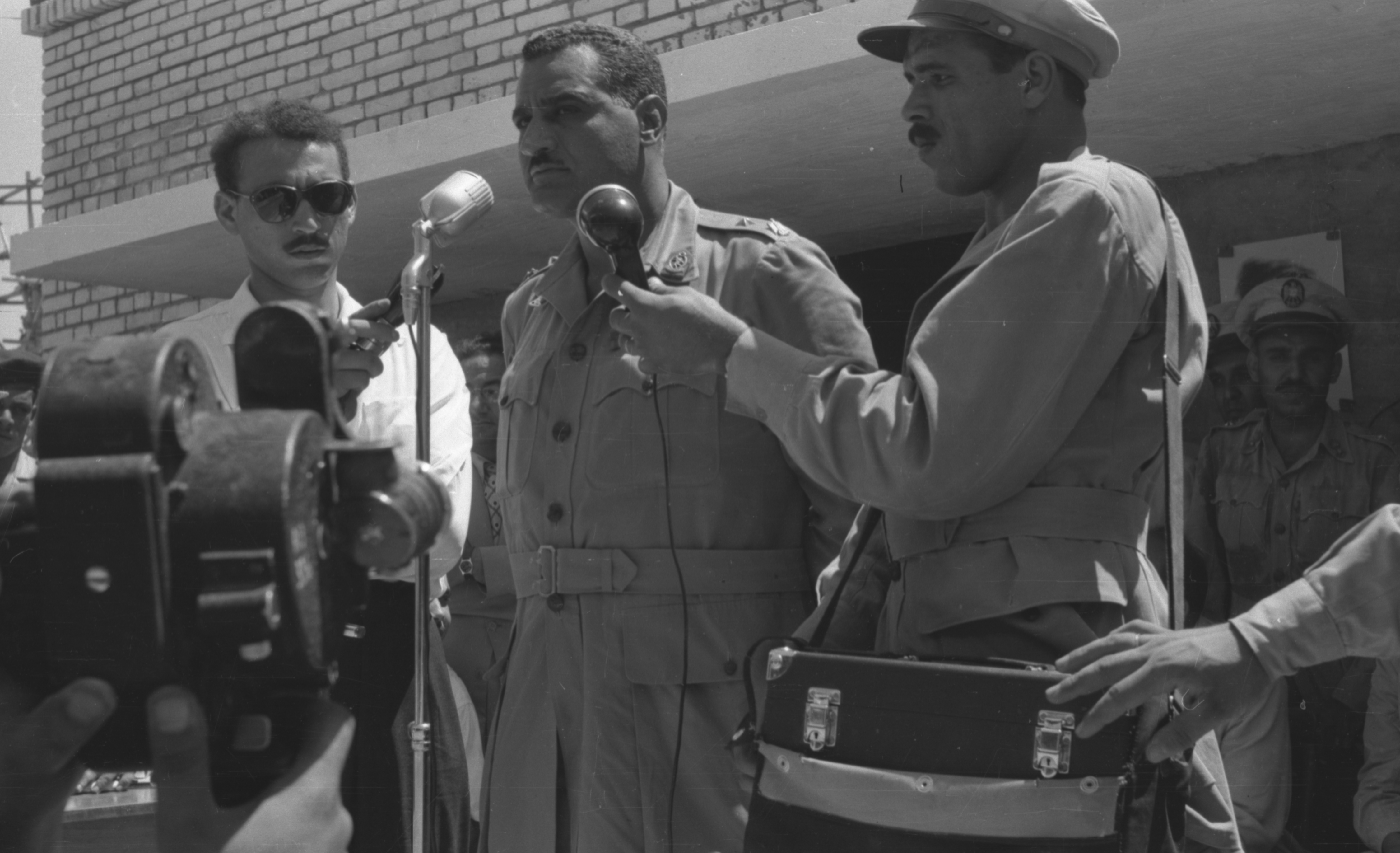
Nasser giving a speech at the opening of the Suez Canal

After the three-year transition period ended with Nasser's official assumption of power, his domestic and independent foreign policies increasingly collided with the regional interests of the UK and France. The latter condemned his strong support for Algerian independence, and the UK's Eden government was agitated by Nasser's campaign against the Baghdad Pact. In addition, Nasser's adherence to neutralism regarding the Cold War, recognition of communist China, and arms deal with the Eastern bloc alienated the United States. On 19 July 1956, the US and UK abruptly withdrew their offer to finance construction of the Aswan Dam, citing concerns that Egypt's economy would be overwhelmed by the project.

Nasser was informed of the British–American withdrawal in a news statement while aboard a plane returning to Cairo from Belgrade, and took great offense. Although ideas for nationalizing the Suez Canal Company were in the offing after the UK agreed to withdraw its military from Egypt in 1954 (the last British troops left on 13 June 1956), journalist Mohamed Hassanein Heikal asserts that Nasser made the final decision to nationalize the company that operated the waterway between 19 and 20 July. Nasser himself would later state that he decided on 23 July, after studying the issue and deliberating with some of his advisers from the dissolved RCC, namely Boghdadi and technical specialist Mahmoud Younis, beginning on 21 July. The rest of the RCC's former members were informed of the decision on 24 July, while the bulk of the cabinet was unaware of the nationalization scheme until hours before Nasser publicly announced it. According to Ramadan, Nasser's decision to nationalize the canal was a solitary decision, taken without consultation.

On 26 July 1956, Nasser gave a speech in Alexandria announcing the nationalization of the Suez Canal Company as a means to fund the Aswan Dam project in light of the British–American withdrawal. In the speech, he denounced British imperialism in Egypt and British control over the canal company's profits, and upheld that the Egyptian people had a right to sovereignty over the waterway, especially since "120,000 Egyptians had died building it". The motion was technically in breach of the international agreement he had signed with the UK on 19 October 1954, although he ensured that all existing stockholders would be paid off.

The nationalization announcement was greeted very emotionally by the audience and, throughout the Arab world, thousands entered the streets shouting slogans of support. US ambassador Henry A. Byroade stated, "I cannot overemphasize [the] popularity of the Canal Company nationalization within Egypt, even among Nasser's enemies." Egyptian political scientist Mahmoud Hamad wrote that, prior to 1956, Nasser had consolidated control over Egypt's military and civilian bureaucracies, but it was only after the canal's nationalization that he gained near-total popular legitimacy and firmly established himself as the "charismatic leader" and "spokesman for the masses not only in Egypt, but all over the Third World". According to Aburish, this was Nasser's largest pan-Arab triumph at the time and "soon his pictures were to be found in the tents of Yemen, the souks of Marrakesh, and the posh villas of Syria". The official reason given for the nationalization was that funds from the canal would be used for the construction of the dam in Aswan. That same day, Egypt closed the canal to Israeli shipping.

=== Suez Crisis ===
Movietone newsreels reporting Nasser's nationalization of the Suez Canal and both domestic and Western reactions

France and the UK, the largest shareholders in the Suez Canal Company, saw its nationalization as yet another hostile measure aimed at them by the Egyptian government. Nasser was aware that the canal's nationalization would instigate an international crisis and believed the prospect of military intervention by the two countries was 80 percent likely. Nasser dismissed their claims, and believed that the UK would not be able to intervene militarily for at least two months after the announcement, and dismissed Israeli action as "impossible". In early October, the UN Security Council met on the matter of the canal's nationalization and adopted a resolution recognizing Egypt's right to control the canal as long as it continued to allow passage through it for foreign ships. According to Heikal, after this agreement, "Nasser estimated that the danger of invasion had dropped to 10 percent". Shortly thereafter, however, the UK, France, and Israel made a secret agreement to take over the Suez Canal, occupy the Suez Canal zone, and topple Nasser.

On 29 October 1956, Israeli forces crossed the Sinai Peninsula, overwhelmed Egyptian army posts, and quickly advanced to their objectives. Two days later, British and French planes bombarded Egyptian airfields in the canal zone. Nasser ordered the military's high command to withdraw the Egyptian Army from Sinai to bolster the canal's defenses. Moreover, he feared that if the armored corps was dispatched to confront the Israeli invading force and the British and French subsequently landed in the canal city of Port Said, Egyptian armor in the Sinai would be cut off from the canal and destroyed by the combined tripartite forces. Amer strongly disagreed, insisting that Egyptian tanks meet the Israelis in battle. The two had a heated exchange on 3 November, and Amer conceded. Nasser also ordered blockage of the canal by sinking or otherwise disabling forty-nine ships at its entrance.

Despite the commanded withdrawal of Egyptian troops, about 2,000 Egyptian soldiers were killed during engagement with Israeli forces, and some 5,000 Egyptian soldiers were captured by the Israeli Army. Amer and Salah Salem proposed requesting a ceasefire, with Salem further recommending that Nasser surrender himself to British forces. Nasser berated Amer and Salem, and vowed, "Nobody is going to surrender." Nasser assumed military command. Despite the relative ease in which Sinai was occupied, Nasser's prestige at home and among Arabs was undamaged. To counterbalance the Egyptian Army's dismal performance, Nasser authorized the distribution of about 400,000 rifles to civilian volunteers and hundreds of militias were formed throughout Egypt, many led by Nasser's political opponents.

It was at Port Said that Nasser saw a confrontation with the invading forces as being the strategic and psychological focal point of Egypt's defense. A third infantry battalion and hundreds of national guardsmen were sent to the city as reinforcements, while two regular companies were dispatched to organize popular resistance. Nasser and Boghdadi traveled to the canal zone to boost the morale of the armed volunteers. According to Boghdadi's memoirs, Nasser described the Egyptian Army as "shattered" as he saw the wreckage of Egyptian military equipment en route. When British and French forces landed in Port Said on 5–6 November, its local militia put up a stiff resistance, resulting in street-to-street fighting. The Egyptian Army commander in the city was preparing to request terms for a ceasefire, but Nasser ordered him to desist. The British-French forces managed to largely secure the city by 7 November. Between 750 and 1,000 Egyptians were killed in the battle for Port Said.

The US Eisenhower administration condemned the tripartite invasion, and supported UN resolutions demanding withdrawal and a United Nations Emergency Force (UNEF) to be stationed in Sinai. Nasser commended Eisenhower, stating he played the "greatest and most decisive role" in stopping the "tripartite conspiracy". By the end of December, British and French forces had totally withdrawn from Egyptian territory, while Israel completed its withdrawal in March 1957 and released all Egyptian prisoners of war. As a result of the Suez Crisis, Nasser brought in a set of regulations imposing rigorous requirements for residency and citizenship as well as forced expulsions, mostly affecting British and French nationals and Jews with foreign nationality, as well as many Egyptian Jews. Some 25,000 Jews, almost half of the Jewish community, left in 1956, mainly for Israel, Europe, the United States and South America.

After the fighting ended, Amer accused Nasser of provoking an unnecessary war and then blaming the military for the result. On 8 April, the canal was reopened, and Nasser's political position was enormously enhanced by the widely perceived failure of the invasion and attempt to topple him. British diplomat Anthony Nutting claimed the crisis "established Nasser finally and completely" as the rayyes (president) of Egypt.

== Pan-Arabism and socialism ==
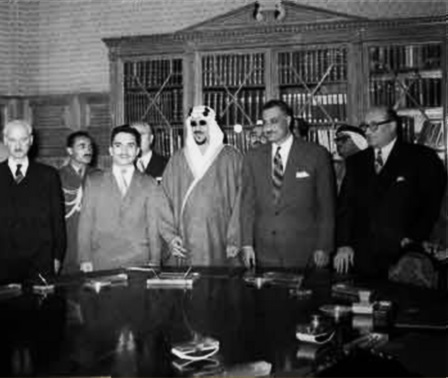
The signing of the regional defense pact between Egypt, Saudi Arabia, Syria and Jordan, January 1957. At the forefront, from left right: Prime Minister Sulayman al-Nabulsi of Jordan, King Hussein of Jordan, King Saud of Saudi Arabia, Nasser, Prime Minister Sabri al-Asali of Syria

By 1957, pan-Arabism had become the dominant ideology in the Arab world, and the average Arab citizen considered Nasser their undisputed leader. Historian Adeed Dawisha credited Nasser's status to his "charisma, bolstered by his perceived victory in the Suez Crisis". The Cairo-based Voice of the Arabs radio station spread Nasser's ideas of united Arab action throughout the Arabic-speaking world, so much so that historian Eugene Rogan wrote, "Nasser conquered the Arab world by radio." Lebanese sympathizers of Nasser and the Egyptian embassy in Beirut—the press center of the Arab world—bought out Lebanese media outlets to further disseminate Nasser's ideals. Egypt also expanded its policy of secondment, dispatching thousands of high-skilled Egyptian professionals (usually politically active teachers) across the region. Nasser also enjoyed the support of Arab nationalist civilian and paramilitary organizations throughout the region. His followers were numerous and well-funded, but lacked any permanent structure and organization. They called themselves "Nasserites", despite Nasser's objection to the label (he preferred the term "Arab nationalists").

In January 1957, the US adopted the Eisenhower Doctrine and pledged to prevent the spread of communism and its perceived agents in the Middle East. Although Nasser was an opponent of communism in the region, his promotion of pan-Arabism was viewed as a threat by pro-Western states in the region. Eisenhower tried to isolate Nasser and reduce his regional influence by attempting to transform King Saud into a counterweight. Also in January, the elected Jordanian prime minister and Nasser supporter Sulayman al-Nabulsi brought Jordan into a military pact with Egypt, Syria, and Saudi Arabia.

Relations between Nasser and King Hussein of Jordan deteriorated in April when Hussein implicated Nasser in two coup attempts against him—although Nasser's involvement was never established—and dissolved al-Nabulsi's cabinet. Nasser subsequently slammed Hussein on Cairo radio as being "a tool of the imperialists". Relations with King Saud also became antagonistic as the latter began to fear that Nasser's increasing popularity in Saudi Arabia was a genuine threat to the royal family's survival. Despite opposition from the governments of Jordan, Saudi Arabia, Iraq, and Lebanon, Nasser maintained his prestige among their citizens and those of other Arab countries.

By the end of 1957, Nasser nationalized all remaining British and French assets in Egypt, including the tobacco, cement, pharmaceutical, and phosphate industries. When efforts to offer tax incentives and attract outside investments yielded no tangible results, he nationalized more companies and made them a part of his economic development organization. He stopped short of total government control: two-thirds of the economy was still in private hands. This effort achieved a measure of success, with increased agricultural production and investment in industrialization. Nasser initiated the Helwan steelworks, which subsequently became Egypt's largest enterprise, providing the country with product and tens of thousands of jobs. Nasser also decided to cooperate with the Soviet Union in the construction of the Aswan Dam to replace the withdrawal of US funds.

=== United Arab Republic ===
Newsreel clip about Nasser and Quwatli's establishment of United Arab Republic

Despite his popularity with the people of the Arab world, by mid-1957 his only regional ally was Syria. In September, Turkish troops massed along the Syrian border, giving credence to rumors that the Baghdad Pact countries were attempting to topple Syria's leftist government. Nasser sent a contingent force to Syria as a symbolic display of solidarity, further elevating his prestige in the Arab world, and particularly among Syrians.

As political instability grew in Syria, delegations from the country were sent to Nasser demanding immediate unification with Egypt. Nasser initially turned down the request, citing the two countries' incompatible political and economic systems, lack of contiguity, the Syrian military's record of intervention in politics, and the deep factionalism among Syria's political forces. However, in January 1958, a second Syrian delegation managed to convince Nasser of an impending communist takeover and a consequent slide to civil strife. Nasser subsequently opted for union, albeit on the condition that it would be a total political merger with him as its president, to which the delegates and Syrian president Shukri al-Quwatli agreed. On 1 February, the United Arab Republic (UAR) was proclaimed and, according to Dawisha, the Arab world reacted in "stunned amazement, which quickly turned into uncontrolled euphoria." Nasser ordered a crackdown against Syrian communists, dismissing many of them from their governmental posts.

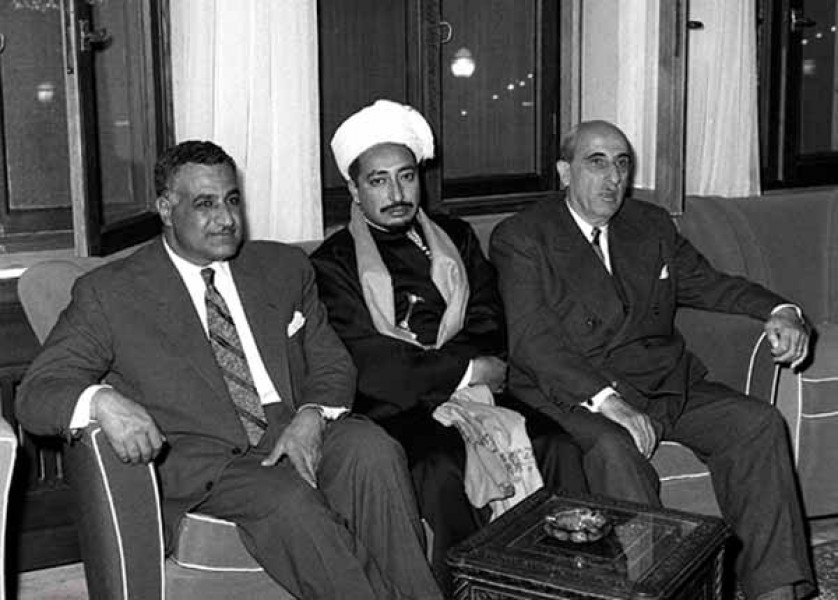
Nasser seated alongside Crown Prince Muhammad al-Badr of North Yemen (center) and Shukri al-Quwatli (right), February 1958. North Yemen joined the UAR to form the United Arab States, a loose confederation.

On a surprise visit to Damascus to celebrate the union on 24 February, Nasser was welcomed by crowds in the hundreds of thousands. Crown Prince Imam Badr of North Yemen was dispatched to Damascus with proposals to include his country in the new republic. Nasser agreed to establish a loose federal union with Yemen—the United Arab States—in place of total integration. While Nasser was in Syria, King Saud planned to have him assassinated on his return flight to Cairo. On 4 March, Nasser addressed the masses in Damascus and waved before them the Saudi check given to Syrian security chief and, unbeknownst to the Saudis, ardent Nasser supporter Abdel Hamid Sarraj to shoot down Nasser's plane. As a consequence of Saud's plot, he was forced by senior members of the Saudi royal family to informally cede most of his powers to his brother, King Faisal, a major Nasser opponent who advocated pan-Islamic unity over pan-Arabism.

A day after announcing the attempt on his life, Nasser established a new provisional constitution proclaiming a 600-member National Assembly (400 from Egypt and 200 from Syria) and the dissolution of all political parties. Nasser gave each of the provinces two vice-presidents: Boghdadi and Amer in Egypt, and Sabri al-Asali and Akram al-Hawrani in Syria. Nasser then left for Moscow to meet with Nikita Khrushchev. At the meeting, Khrushchev pressed Nasser to lift the ban on the Communist Party, but Nasser refused, stating it was an internal matter which was not a subject of discussion with outside powers. Khrushchev was reportedly taken aback and denied he had meant to interfere in the UAR's affairs. The matter was settled as both leaders sought to prevent a rift between their two countries.

With the establishment of the United Arab Republic, the United States under President Eisenhower attempted to build better relations and initiate a rapprochement between the two countries, contrasting with the previously cautious stance of the American government towards Nasser. In particular, Nasser sought American assistance in his ideological cold war with Abdel Karim Qasim in Iraq and his ideology of Qasimism, which conflicted with Nasser's pan-Arab nationalism. However, due to major ideological differences, no significant long-term working relationship developed between Nasser and Eisenhower.

=== Influence on the Arab world ===
The holy march on which the Arab nation insists, will carry us forward from one victory to another ... the flag of freedom which flies over Baghdad today will fly over Amman and Riyadh. Yes, the flag of freedom which flies over Cairo, Damascus, and Baghdad today will fly over the rest of the Middle East ...

— Gamal Abdel Nasser, 19 July in Damascus

In Lebanon, clashes between pro-Nasser factions and supporters of staunch Nasser opponent, then-President Camille Chamoun, culminated in civil strife by May. The former sought to unite with the UAR, while the latter sought Lebanon's continued independence. Nasser delegated oversight of the issue to Sarraj, who provided limited aid to Nasser's Lebanese supporters through money, light arms, and officer training—short of the large-scale support that Chamoun alleged. Nasser did not covet Lebanon, seeing it as a "special case", but sought to prevent Chamoun from a second presidential term. In Oman, the Jebel Akhdar War between the rebels in the interior of Oman against the British-backed Sultanate of Oman prompted Nasser to support the rebels in what was considered a war against colonialism between 1954 and 1959.

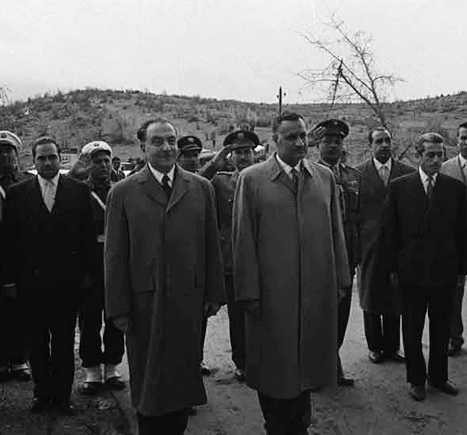
Nasser (right) and Lebanese president Fuad Chehab (to Nasser's right) at the Syrian–Lebanese border during talks to end the crisis in Lebanon. Akram al-Hawrani stands third to Nasser's left, and Abdel Hamid Sarraj stands to Chehab's right, March 1959.

On 14 July 1958, Iraqi army officers Abdel Karim Qasim and Abdel Salam Aref overthrew the Iraqi monarchy and, the next day, Iraqi prime minister and Nasser's chief Arab antagonist, Nuri al-Said, was killed. The entire Iraqi royal family was killed, and Al-Said's and Iraqi crown prince 'Abd al-Ilah's bodies were mutilated and dragged across Baghdad. Nasser recognized the new government and stated that "any attack on Iraq was tantamount to an attack on the UAR". On 15 July, US marines landed in Lebanon, and British special forces in Jordan, upon the request of those countries' governments to prevent them from falling to pro-Nasser forces. Nasser felt that the revolution in Iraq left the road for pan-Arab unity unblocked. On 19 July, for the first time, he declared that he was opting for full Arab union, although he had no plan to merge Iraq with the UAR. While most members of the Iraqi Revolutionary Command Council (RCC) favored Iraqi-UAR unity, Qasim sought to keep Iraq independent and resented Nasser's large popular base in the country.

In the fall of 1958, Nasser formed a tripartite committee consisting of Zakaria Mohieddin, al-Hawrani, and Salah Bitar to oversee developments in Syria. By moving the latter two, who were Ba'athists, to Cairo, he neutralized important political figures who had their own ideas about how Syria should be run. He put Syria under Sarraj, who effectively reduced the province to a police state by imprisoning and exiling landholders who objected to the introduction of Egyptian agricultural reform in Syria, as well as communists. Following the Lebanese election of Fuad Chehab in September 1958, relations between Lebanon and the UAR improved considerably. On 25 March 1959, Chehab and Nasser met at the Lebanese–Syrian border and compromised on an end to the Lebanese crisis.

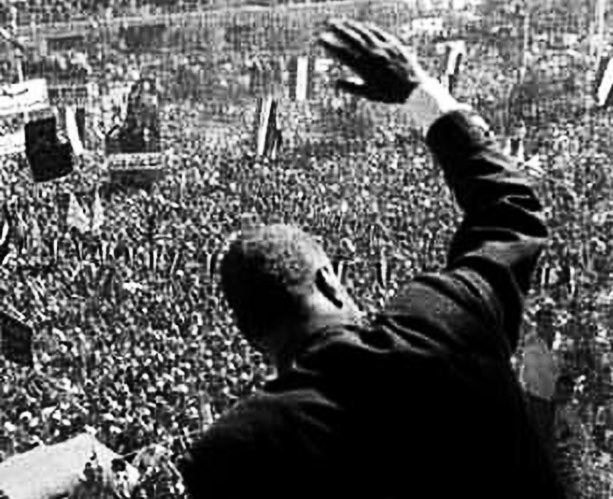
Nasser waving to crowds in Damascus, Syria, October 1960

Relations between Nasser and Qasim grew increasingly bitter on 9 March, after Qasim's forces suppressed a rebellion in Mosul, launched a day earlier by a pro-Nasser Iraqi RCC officer backed by UAR authorities. Nasser had considered dispatching troops to aid his Iraqi sympathizers, but decided against it. He clamped down on Egyptian communist activity due to the key backing Iraqi communists provided Qasim. Several influential communists were arrested, including Nasser's old comrade Khaled Mohieddin, who had been allowed to re-enter Egypt in 1956.

By December, the political situation in Syria was faltering and Nasser responded by appointing Amer as governor-general alongside Sarraj. Syria's leaders opposed the appointment and many resigned from their government posts. Nasser later met with the opposition leaders and in a heated moment, exclaimed that he was the elected president of the UAR and those who did not accept his authority could "walk away".

=== Collapse of the union and aftermath ===
Opposition to the union mounted among some of Syria's key elements, namely the socioeconomic, political, and military elites. In response to Syria's worsening economy, which Nasser attributed to its control by the bourgeoisie, in July 1961, Nasser decreed socialist measures that nationalized wide-ranging sectors of the Syrian economy. He also dismissed Sarraj in September to curb the growing political crisis. Aburish states that Nasser was not fully capable of addressing Syrian problems because they were "foreign to him". In Egypt, the economic situation was more positive, with a GNP growth of 4.5 percent and a rapid growth of industry. In 1960, Nasser nationalized the Egyptian press, which had already been cooperating with his government, in order to steer coverage towards the country's socioeconomic issues and galvanize public support for his socialist measures.

On 28 September 1961, secessionist army units launched a coup in Damascus, declaring Syria's secession from the UAR. In response, pro-union army units in northern Syria revolted and pro-Nasser protests occurred in major Syrian cities. Nasser sent Egyptian Special Forces to Latakia to bolster his allies, but withdrew them two days later, citing a refusal to allow inter-Arab fighting. Addressing the UAR's breakup on 5 October, Nasser accepted personal responsibility and declared that Egypt would recognize an elected Syrian government. He privately blamed interference by hostile Arab governments. According to Heikal, Nasser suffered something resembling a nervous breakdown after the dissolution of the union; he began to smoke more heavily and his health began to deteriorate.

=== Revival on regional stage ===
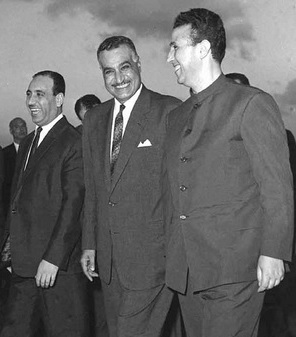
Nasser (center) receiving Algerian president Ahmed Ben Bella (right) and Iraqi president Abdel Salam Aref (left) for the Arab League summit in Alexandria, September 1964. Ben Bella and Aref were close allies of Nasser.

Nasser's regional position changed unexpectedly when Yemeni officers led by Nasser supporter Abdullah al-Sallal overthrew Imam Badr of North Yemen on 27 September 1962. Al-Badr and his tribal partisans began receiving increasing support from Saudi Arabia to help reinstate the kingdom, while Nasser subsequently accepted a request by Sallal to militarily aid the new government on 30 September. Consequently, Egypt became increasingly embroiled in the drawn-out civil war, with 60,000 Egyptian soldiers deployed in North Yemen in March 1966. In August 1967, in order to make up for Egyptian losses during the Six-Day War, Nasser recalled 15,000 troops from North Yemen. As part of the Khartoum Resolution at the 1967 Arab League summit in the same month, Egypt announced that it was ready to withdraw all its soldiers from North Yemen and it did so by the end of 1967. 26,000 Egyptian soldiers were killed during the intervention. Most of Nasser's old colleagues had questioned the wisdom of continuing the war, but Amer reassured Nasser of their coming victory. Nasser later remarked in 1968 that intervention in Yemen was a "miscalculation".

In July 1962, Algeria became independent of France. As a staunch political and financial supporter of the Algerian independence movement, Nasser considered the country's independence to be a personal victory. Amid these developments, a pro-Nasser clique in the Saudi royal family led by Prince Talal defected to Egypt, along with the Jordanian chief of staff, in early 1963.

On 8 February 1963, a military coup in Iraq led by a Ba'athist–Nasserist alliance toppled Qasim, who was subsequently shot dead. Abdel Salam Aref, a Nasserist, was chosen to be the new president. A similar alliance toppled the Syrian government on 8 March. On 14 March, the new Iraqi and Syrian governments sent Nasser delegations to push for a new Arab union. At the meeting, Nasser lambasted the Ba'athists for "facilitating" Syria's split from the UAR, and asserted that he was the "leader of the Arabs". A transitional unity agreement stipulating a federal system was signed by the parties on 17 April and the new union was set to be established in May 1965. However, the agreement fell apart weeks later when Syria's Ba'athists purged Nasser's supporters from the officers corps. A failed counter-coup by a Nasserist colonel followed, after which Nasser condemned the Ba'athists as "fascists".

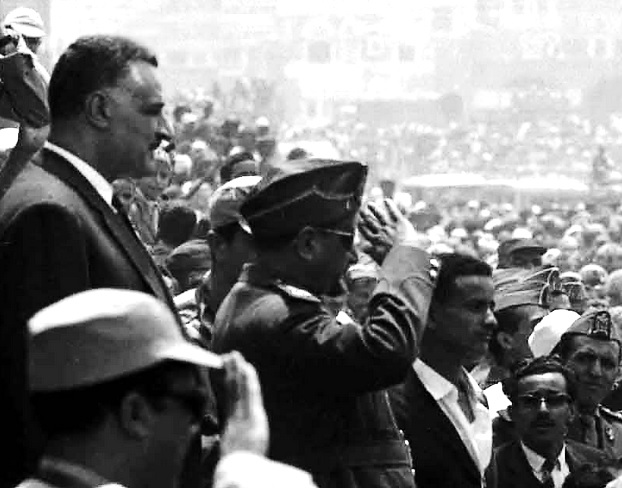
Nasser before Yemeni crowds on his arrival to Sanaa, April 1964. In front of Nasser and giving a salute is Yemeni President Abdullah al-Sallal

In January 1964, Nasser called for an Arab League summit in Cairo to establish a unified Arab response against Israel's plans to divert the Jordan River's waters for economic purposes, which Syria and Jordan deemed an act of war. Nasser blamed Arab divisions for what he deemed "the disastrous situation". He discouraged Syria and Palestinian guerrillas from provoking the Israelis, conceding that he had no plans for war with Israel. During the summit, Nasser developed cordial relations with King Hussein, and ties were mended with the rulers of Saudi Arabia, Syria, and Morocco. In May, Nasser moved to formally share his leadership position over the Palestine issue by initiating the creation of the Palestine Liberation Organization (PLO). In practice, Nasser used the PLO to wield control over the Palestinian fedayeen. Its head was to be Ahmad Shukeiri, Nasser's personal nominee.

After years of foreign policy coordination and developing ties, Nasser, President Sukarno of Indonesia, President Tito of Yugoslavia, and Prime Minister Nehru of India founded the Non-Aligned Movement (NAM) in 1961. Its declared purpose was to solidify international non-alignment and promote world peace amid the Cold War, end colonization, and increase economic cooperation among developing countries. In 1964, Nasser was made president of the NAM and held the second conference of the organization in Cairo.

Nasser played a significant part in the strengthening of African solidarity in the late 1950s and early 1960s, although his continental leadership role had increasingly passed to Algeria since 1962. During this period, Nasser made Egypt a refuge for anti-colonial leaders from several African countries and allowed the broadcast of anti-colonial propaganda from Cairo. Beginning in 1958, Nasser had a key role in the discussions among African leaders that led to the establishment of the Organisation of African Unity (OAU) in 1963.

== Modernization efforts and internal dissent ==
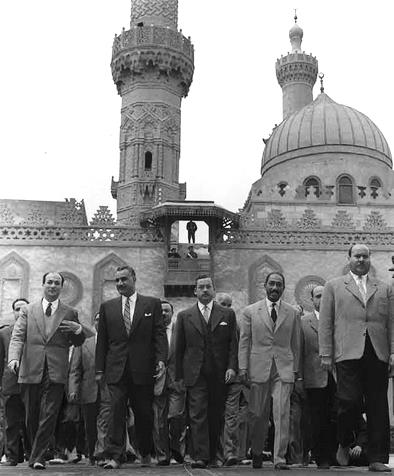
Government officials attending Friday prayers at al-Azhar Mosque, 1959. From left to right; Interior Minister Zakaria Mohieddin, Nasser, Social Affairs Minister Hussein el-Shafei and National Union Secretary Anwar Sadat

=== Al-Azhar ===
In 1961, Nasser sought to firmly establish Egypt as the leader of the Arab world and to promote a second revolution in Egypt with the purpose of merging Islamic and socialist thinking. To achieve this, he initiated several reforms to modernize al-Azhar, which serves as the de facto leading authority in Sunni Islam, and to ensure its prominence over the Muslim Brotherhood and the more conservative Wahhabism promoted by Saudi Arabia. Nasser had used al-Azhar's most willing ulema (scholars) as a counterweight to the Brotherhood's Islamic influence, starting in 1953.

Nasser instructed al-Azhar to create changes in its syllabus that trickled to the lower levels of Egyptian education, consequently allowing the establishment of coeducational schools and the introduction of evolution into school curriculum. The reforms also included the merger of religious and civil courts. Moreover, Nasser forced al-Azhar to issue a fatwā admitting Shia Muslims, Alawites, and Druze into mainstream Islam; for centuries prior, al-Azhar deemed them to be "heretics".

=== Rivalry with Amer ===
Following Syria's secession, Nasser grew concerned with Amer's inability to train and modernize the army, and with the state within a state Amer had created in the military command and intelligence apparatus. In late 1961, Nasser established the Presidential Council and decreed it the authority to approve all senior military appointments, instead of leaving this responsibility solely to Amer. Moreover, he instructed that the primary criterion for promotion should be merit and not personal loyalties. Nasser retracted the initiative after Amer's allies in the officers corps threatened to mobilize against him.

In early 1962 Nasser again attempted to wrest control of the military command from Amer. Amer responded by directly confronting Nasser for the first time and secretly rallying his loyalist officers. Nasser ultimately backed down, wary of a possible violent confrontation between the military and his civilian government. According to Boghdadi, the stress caused by the UAR's collapse and Amer's increasing autonomy forced Nasser, who already had diabetes, to practically live on painkillers from then on.

=== National Charter and second term ===
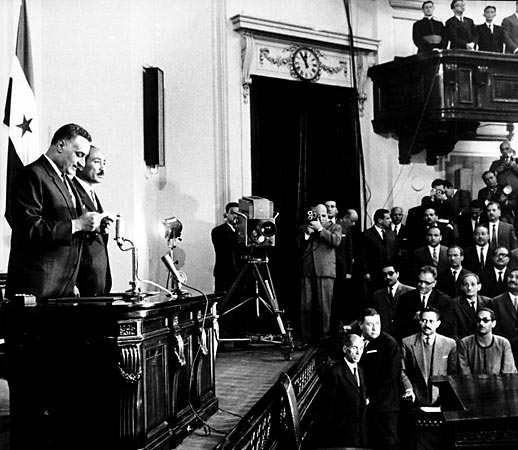
Nasser being sworn in for a second term as Egypt's president, 25 March 1965

In October 1961, Nasser embarked on a major nationalization program for Egypt, believing the total adoption of socialism was the answer to his country's problems and would have prevented Syria's secession. In order to organize and solidify his popular base with Egypt's citizens and counter the army's influence, Nasser introduced the National Charter in 1962 and a new constitution. The charter called for universal health care, affordable housing, vocational schools, greater women's rights and a family planning program, as well as widening the Suez Canal.

Nasser also attempted to maintain oversight of the country's civil service to prevent it from inflating and consequently becoming a burden to the state. New laws provided workers with a minimum wage, profit shares, free education, free health care, reduced working hours, and encouragement to participate in management. Land reforms guaranteed the security of tenant farmers, promoted agricultural growth, and reduced rural poverty. As a result of the 1962 measures, government ownership of Egyptian business reached 51 percent, and the National Union was renamed the Arab Socialist Union (ASU). With these measures came more domestic repression, as thousands of Islamists were imprisoned, including dozens of military officers. Nasser's tilt toward a Soviet-style system led his aides Boghdadi and Hussein el-Shafei to submit their resignations in protest.

During the presidential referendum in Egypt, Nasser was re-elected to a second term as UAR president and took his oath on 25 March 1965. He was the only candidate for the position, with virtually all of his political opponents forbidden by law from running for office, and his fellow party members reduced to mere followers. That same year, Nasser had the Muslim Brotherhood chief ideologue Sayyed Qutb imprisoned. Qutb was charged and found guilty by the court of plotting to assassinate Nasser, and was executed in 1966. Beginning in 1966, as Egypt's economy slowed and government debt became increasingly burdensome, Nasser began to ease state control over the private sector, encouraging state-owned bank loans to private business and introducing incentives to increase exports. During the '60s, the Egyptian economy went from sluggishness to the verge of collapse, the society became less free, and Nasser's appeal waned considerably.

== Six-Day War ==
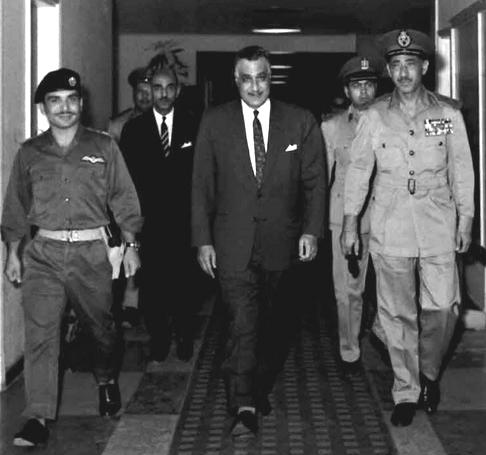
Nasser (center), King Hussein of Jordan (left) and Egyptian Army Chief of Staff Abdel Hakim Amer (right) at the Supreme Command of the Armed Forces headquarters in Cairo before signing a mutual defense pact, 30 May 1967

In mid May 1967, the Soviet Union issued warnings to Nasser of an impending Israeli attack on Syria, although Chief of Staff Mohamed Fawzi considered the warnings to be "baseless". According to Kandil, without Nasser's authorization, Amer used the Soviet warnings as a pretext to dispatch troops to Sinai on 14 May, and Nasser subsequently demanded UNEF's withdrawal. Earlier that day, Nasser received a warning from King Hussein of Israeli-American collusion to drag Egypt into war. The message had been originally received by Amer on 2 May, but was withheld from Nasser until the Sinai deployment on 14 May. Although in the preceding months, Hussein and Nasser had been accusing each other of avoiding a fight with Israel, Hussein was nonetheless wary that an Egyptian–Israeli war would risk the West Bank's occupation by Israel. Nasser still felt that the US would restrain Israel from attacking due to assurances that he received from the US and Soviet Union. In turn, he also reassured both powers that Egypt would only act defensively.

On 21 May, Amer asked Nasser to order the Straits of Tiran blockaded, a move Nasser believed Israel would use as a casus belli. Amer reassured him that the army was prepared for confrontation, but Nasser doubted Amer's assessment of the military's readiness. According to Nasser's vice president Zakaria Mohieddin, although "Amer had absolute authority over the armed forces, Nasser had his ways of knowing what was really going on". Moreover, Amer anticipated an impending Israeli attack and advocated a preemptive strike. Nasser refused the call upon determination that the air force lacked pilots and Amer's handpicked officers were incompetent. Still, Nasser concluded that if Israel attacked, Egypt's quantitative advantage in manpower and arms could stave off Israeli forces for at least two weeks, allowing for diplomacy towards a ceasefire. Israel repeated declarations it had made in 1957 that any closure of the Straits would be considered an act of war, or justification for war, but Nasser closed the Straits to Israeli shipping on 22–23 May. Towards the end of May, Nasser increasingly exchanged his positions of deterrence for deference to the inevitability of war, under increased pressure to act by both the general Arab populace and various Arab governments. On 26 May Nasser declared, "our basic objective will be to destroy Israel". On 30 May, King Hussein committed Jordan in an alliance with Egypt and Syria.

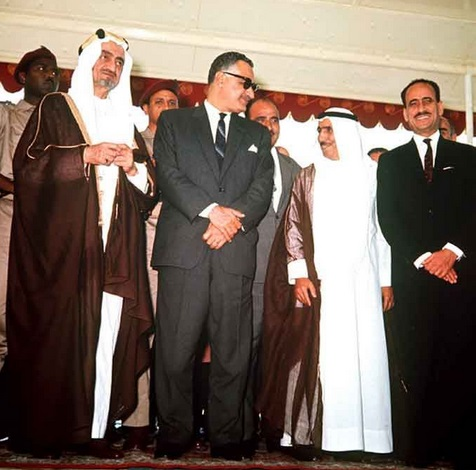
Some of the attending heads of state at the Arab League Summit in Khartoum following the Six-Day War. From left to right: Faisal of Saudi Arabia, Nasser, Abdullah al-Sallal of Yemen, Sabah Al-Salim Al-Sabah of Kuwait and Abd al-Rahman Arif of Iraq, 2 September 1967

On the morning of 5 June, the Israeli Air Force struck Egyptian air fields, destroying much of the Egyptian Air Force. Before the day ended, Israeli armored units had cut through Egyptian defense lines and captured the town of el-Arish. The next day, Amer ordered the immediate withdrawal of Egyptian troops from Sinai—causing the majority of Egyptian casualties during the war. Israel quickly captured Sinai and the Gaza Strip from Egypt, the West Bank from Jordan, and the Golan Heights from Syria.

According to Sadat, it was only when the Israelis cut off the Egyptian garrison at Sharm el-Sheikh that Nasser became aware of the situation's gravity. After hearing of the attack, he rushed to army headquarters to inquire about the military situation. The simmering conflict between Nasser and Amer subsequently came to the fore, and officers present reported the pair burst into "a nonstop shouting match". The Supreme Executive Committee, set up by Nasser to oversee the conduct of the war, attributed the repeated Egyptian defeats to the Nasser–Amer rivalry and Amer's overall incompetence. According to Egyptian diplomat Ismail Fahmi, who became foreign minister during Sadat's presidency, the Israeli invasion and Egypt's consequent defeat was a result of Nasser's dismissal of all rational analysis of the situation and his undertaking of a series of irrational decisions.

=== Resignation and aftermath ===
I have taken a decision with which I need your help. I have decided to withdraw totally and for good from any official post or political role, and to return to the ranks of the masses, performing my duty in their midst, like any other citizen. This is a time for action, not grief. ... My whole heart is with you, and let your hearts be with me. May God be with us—hope, light, and guidance in our hearts.

— Nasser's 9 June resignation speech, which was retracted the next day

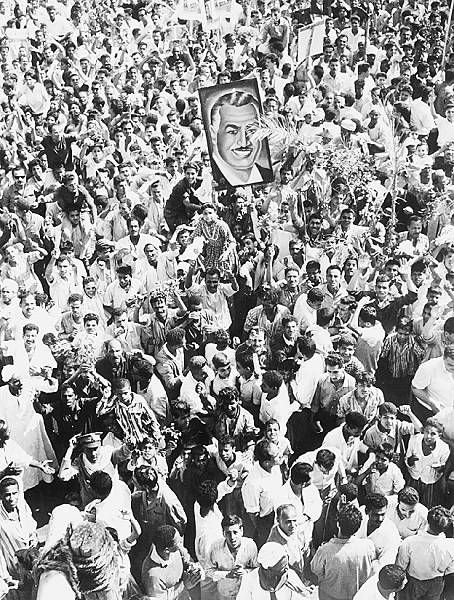
Egyptian demonstrators protesting Nasser's resignation, 1967

During the first four days of the war, the general population of the Arab world believed Arab radio station fabrications of imminent Arab victory. On 9 June, Nasser appeared on television to inform Egypt's citizens of their country's defeat. He announced his resignation on television later that day, and ceded all presidential powers to his then-Vice President Zakaria Mohieddin, who had no prior information of this decision and refused to accept the post. It was in this resignation speech that the Six Day War was first called the "setback". The second sentence of his speech ran: "We cannot hide from ourselves the fact that we have met with a grave setback [naksa] in the last few days"—the "naksa" or "setback" for Egypt being the destruction of its armed forces, the loss of the entire Sinai Peninsula and the Gaza region, and the national humiliation and disgrace of losing a war to the vastly smaller Israeli Army.

Hundreds of thousands of sympathizers poured into the streets in mass demonstrations throughout Egypt and across the Arab world rejecting his resignation, chanting, "We are your soldiers, Gamal!" Nasser retracted his decision the next day.

A video clip of Nasser's resignation speech

On 11 July, Nasser replaced Amer with Mohamed Fawzi as general commander, over the protestations of Amer's loyalists in the military, 600 of whom marched on army headquarters and demanded Amer's reinstatement. After Nasser sacked thirty of the loyalists in response, Amer and his allies devised a plan to topple him on 27 August. Nasser was tipped off about their activities and, after several invitations, he convinced Amer to meet him at his home on 24 August. Nasser confronted Amer about the coup plot, which he denied before being arrested by Mohieddin. Amer allegedly committed suicide (others claims state he was poisoned) on 14 September. Despite his souring relationship with Amer, Nasser spoke of losing "the person closest to [him]". Thereafter, Nasser began a process of depoliticizing the armed forces, arresting dozens of leading military and intelligence figures loyal to Amer.

At the 29 August Arab League summit in Khartoum, Nasser's usual commanding position had receded as the attending heads of state expected Saudi King Faisal to lead. A ceasefire in the Yemen War was declared and the summit concluded with the Khartoum Resolution, which, according to Abd al Azim Ramadan, left only one option—a war with Israel.

The Soviet Union soon resupplied the Egyptian military with about half of its former arsenals and broke diplomatic relations with Israel. Nasser cut relations with the US following the war, and, according to Aburish, his policy of "playing the superpowers against each other" ended. In November, Nasser accepted UN Resolution 242, which called for Israel's withdrawal from territories acquired in the war. His supporters claimed Nasser's move was meant to buy time to prepare for another confrontation with Israel, while his detractors believed his acceptance of the resolution signaled a waning interest in Palestinian independence.

== Final years of presidency ==
=== Domestic reforms and governmental changes ===
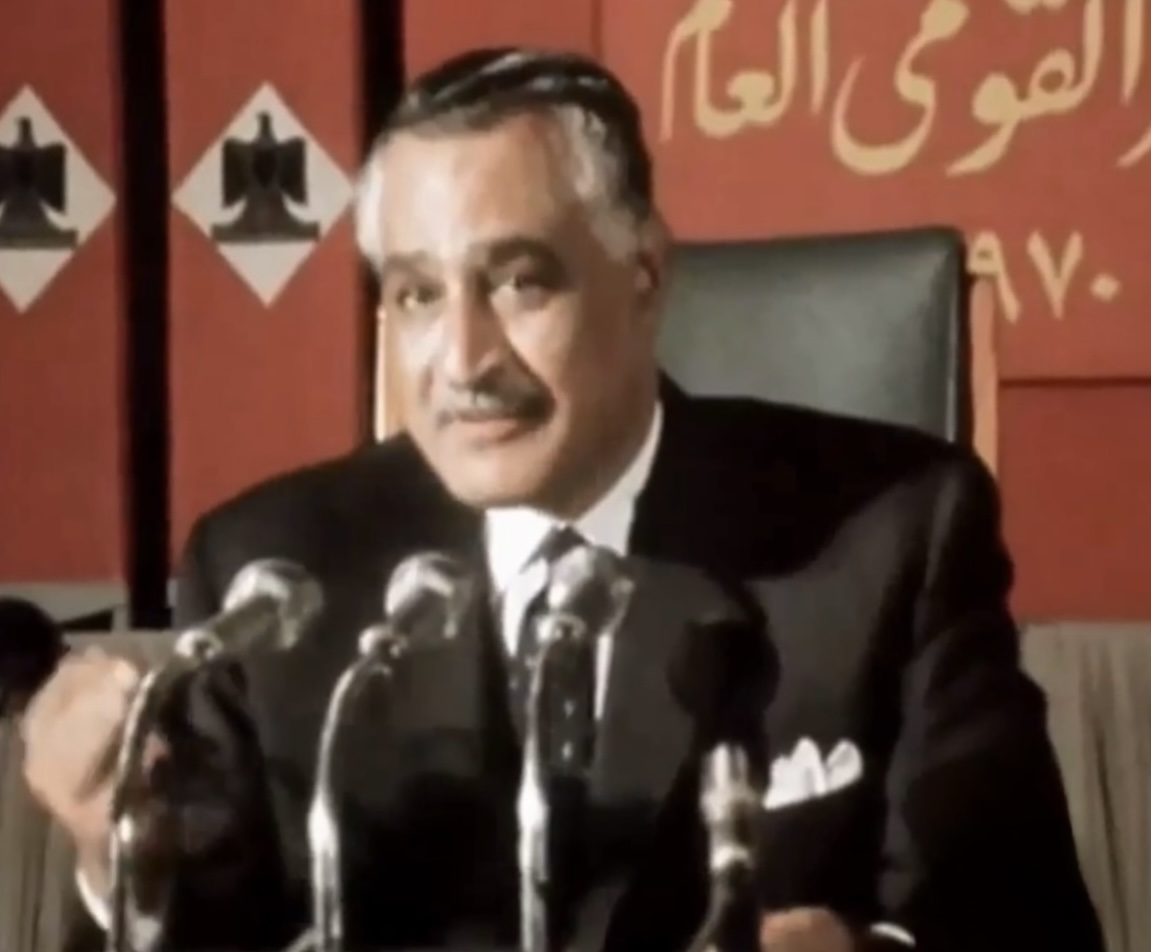
Nasser delivering his final speech to the nation on 23 July 1970

Nasser appointed himself the additional roles of prime minister and supreme commander of the armed forces on 19 June 1967. From 3–4 August 1967, the Arab Socialist Union (ASU)'s executive committee held a debate wherein Nasser bitterly attacked the current single-party system and proposed the creation of a second party. This 'real opposition' would be led by Free Officers Abdel Latif Boghdadi and Kamal el-Din Hussein, who were both former government members who had resigned following differences with Nasser's policies. It would also have been granted access to the same resources enjoyed by the ASU, including its own newspaper. Parliament would be dissolved to make way for elections in December. However, this proposal was met with resistance from his inner circle, including Zakaria Mohieddin and Sadat, who raised concerns about potential economic instability caused by a two-party system and argued that the timing of the move was unsuitable given the current crisis. Nasser's proposal was not implemented.

Angry at the military court's perceived leniency with air force officers charged with negligence during the 1967 war, workers and students launched protests calling for major political reforms in late February 1968. Nasser responded to the demonstrations, the most significant public challenge to his rule since workers' protests in March 1954, by removing most military figures from his cabinet and appointing eight civilians in place of several high-ranking members of the ASU. By 3 March, Nasser directed Egypt's intelligence apparatus to focus on external rather than domestic espionage, and declared the "fall of the mukhabarat state".

On 30 March, Nasser proclaimed a manifesto stipulating the restoration of civil liberties, greater parliamentary independence from the executive, major structural changes to the ASU, and a campaign to rid the government of corrupt elements. A public referendum approved the proposed measures in May, and held subsequent elections for the Supreme Executive Committee, the ASU's highest decision-making body. Observers noted that the declaration signaled an important shift from political repression to liberalization, although its promises would largely go unfulfilled.

Nasser appointed Sadat and Hussein el-Shafei as his vice presidents in December 1969. By then, relations with his other original military comrades, namely Khaled and Zakaria Mohieddin and former vice president Sabri, had become strained. By mid-1970, Nasser pondered replacing Sadat with Boghdadi after reconciling with the latter.

=== War of Attrition and regional diplomatic initiatives ===
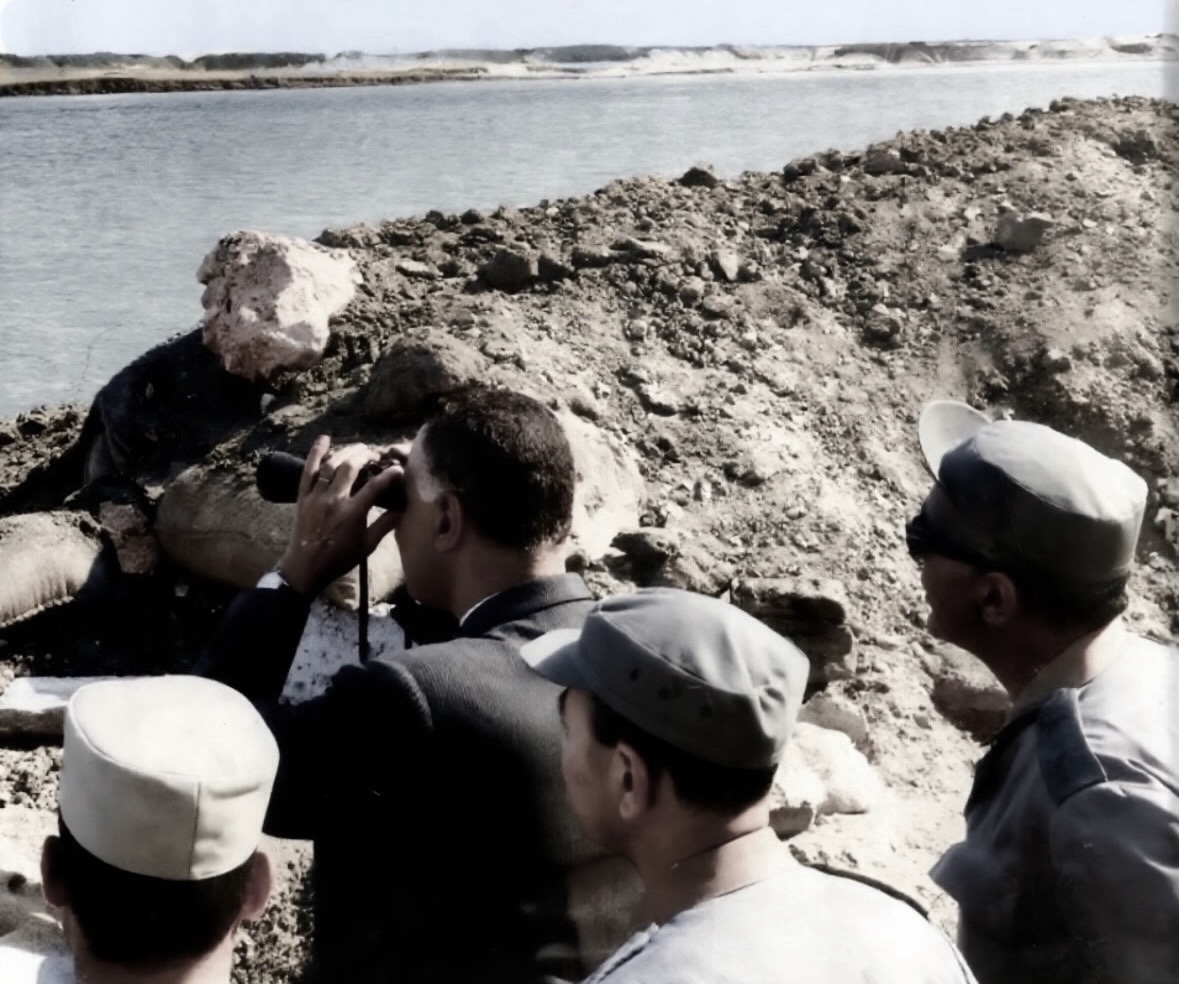
Nasser observing the Suez front with Egyptian officers during the War of Attrition. General Commander Mohamed Fawzi is directly behind Nasser, and to their left is Chief of Staff Abdel Moneim Riad, November 1968

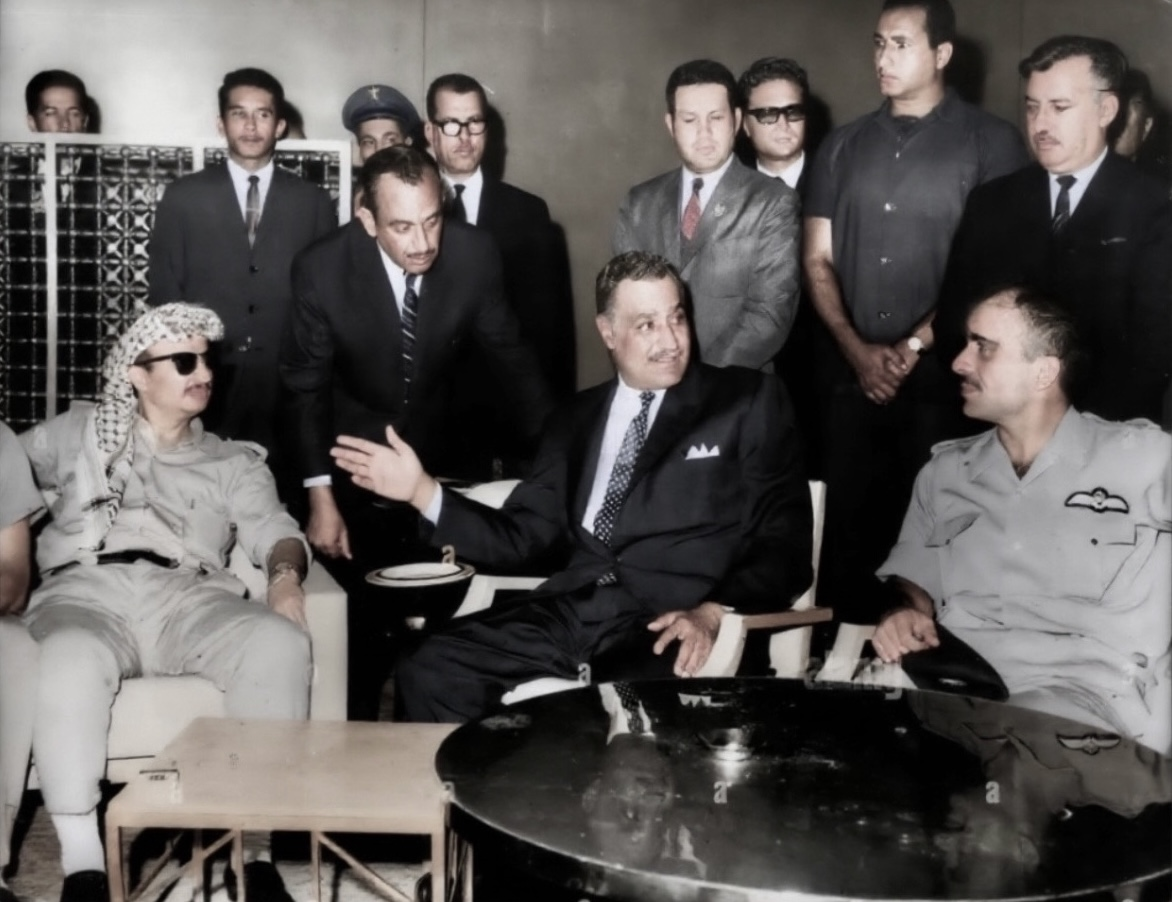
Nasser brokering a ceasefire between Yasser Arafat of the PLO (left) and King Hussein of Jordan (right) at the emergency Arab League summit in Cairo on 27 September 1970, one day before Nasser's death

Meanwhile, in January 1968, Nasser commenced the War of Attrition to reclaim territory captured by Israel, ordering attacks against Israeli positions east of the then-blockaded Suez Canal. In March, Nasser offered Yasser Arafat's Fatah movement arms and funds after their performance against Israeli forces in the Battle of Karameh that month. He also advised Arafat to think of peace with Israel and the establishment of a Palestinian state comprising the West Bank and the Gaza Strip. Nasser effectively ceded his leadership of the "Palestine issue" to Arafat.

Israel retaliated against Egyptian shelling with commando raids, artillery shelling and air strikes. This resulted in an exodus of civilians from Egyptian cities along the Suez Canal's western bank. Nasser ceased all military activities and began a program to build a network of internal defenses, while receiving the financial backing of various Arab states. The war resumed in March 1969. In November, Nasser brokered an agreement between the PLO and the Lebanese military that granted Palestinian guerrillas the right to use Lebanese territory to attack Israel.

In June 1970, Nasser accepted the US-sponsored Rogers Plan, which called for an end to hostilities and an Israeli withdrawal from Egyptian territory, but it was rejected by Israel, the PLO, and most Arab states except Jordan. Nasser had initially rejected the plan, but conceded under pressure from the Soviet Union, which feared that escalating regional conflict could drag it into a war with the US. He also determined that a ceasefire could serve as a tactical step toward the strategic goal of recapturing the Suez Canal. Nasser forestalled any movement toward direct negotiations with Israel. In dozens of speeches and statements, Nasser posited the equation that any direct peace talks with Israel were tantamount to surrender. Following Nasser's acceptance, Israel agreed to a ceasefire and Nasser used the lull in fighting to move surface-to-air missiles towards the canal zone.

Meanwhile, tensions in Jordan between an increasingly autonomous PLO and King Hussein's government had been simmering; following the Dawson's Field hijackings, a military campaign was launched to rout out PLO forces. The offensive elevated risks of a regional war and prompted Nasser to hold an emergency Arab League summit on 27 September in Cairo, where he forged a ceasefire.

== Death and funeral ==
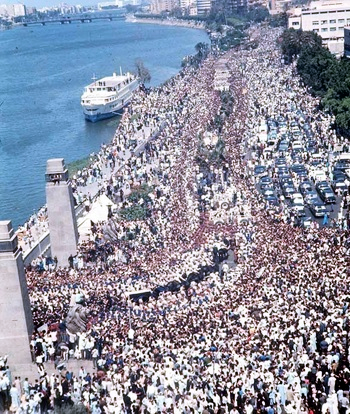
Nasser's funeral procession attended by five million mourners in Cairo, 1 October 1970

As the Arab League summit closed on 28 September 1970, hours after escorting the last Arab leader to leave, Nasser suffered a heart attack. He was immediately transported to his house, where his physicians tended to him. Nasser died several hours later, around 6 p.m. at age 52. Heikal, Sadat, and Nasser's wife Tahia were at his deathbed. According to his doctor, al-Sawi Habibi, Nasser's likely cause of death was arteriosclerosis, varicose veins, and complications from long-standing diabetes. Nasser was also a heavy smoker with a family history of heart disease—two of his brothers died in their fifties from the same condition. The state of Nasser's health was not known to the public prior to his death. He had suffered heart attacks before, in 1966 and September 1969.

Following the announcement of Nasser's death, most Arabs were in a state of shock. Nasser's funeral procession through Cairo on 1 October was attended by at least five million mourners. The 10-kilometer (6.2 mi) procession to his burial site began at the old RCC headquarters with a flyover by MiG-21 jets. His flag-draped coffin was attached to a gun carriage pulled by six horses and led by a column of cavalrymen. All Arab heads of state attended, with the exception of Saudi King Faisal. King Hussein and Arafat cried openly, and Muammar Gaddafi of Libya fainted from emotional distress twice. A few major non-Arab dignitaries were present, including Soviet Premier Alexei Kosygin and French Prime Minister Jacques Chaban-Delmas.

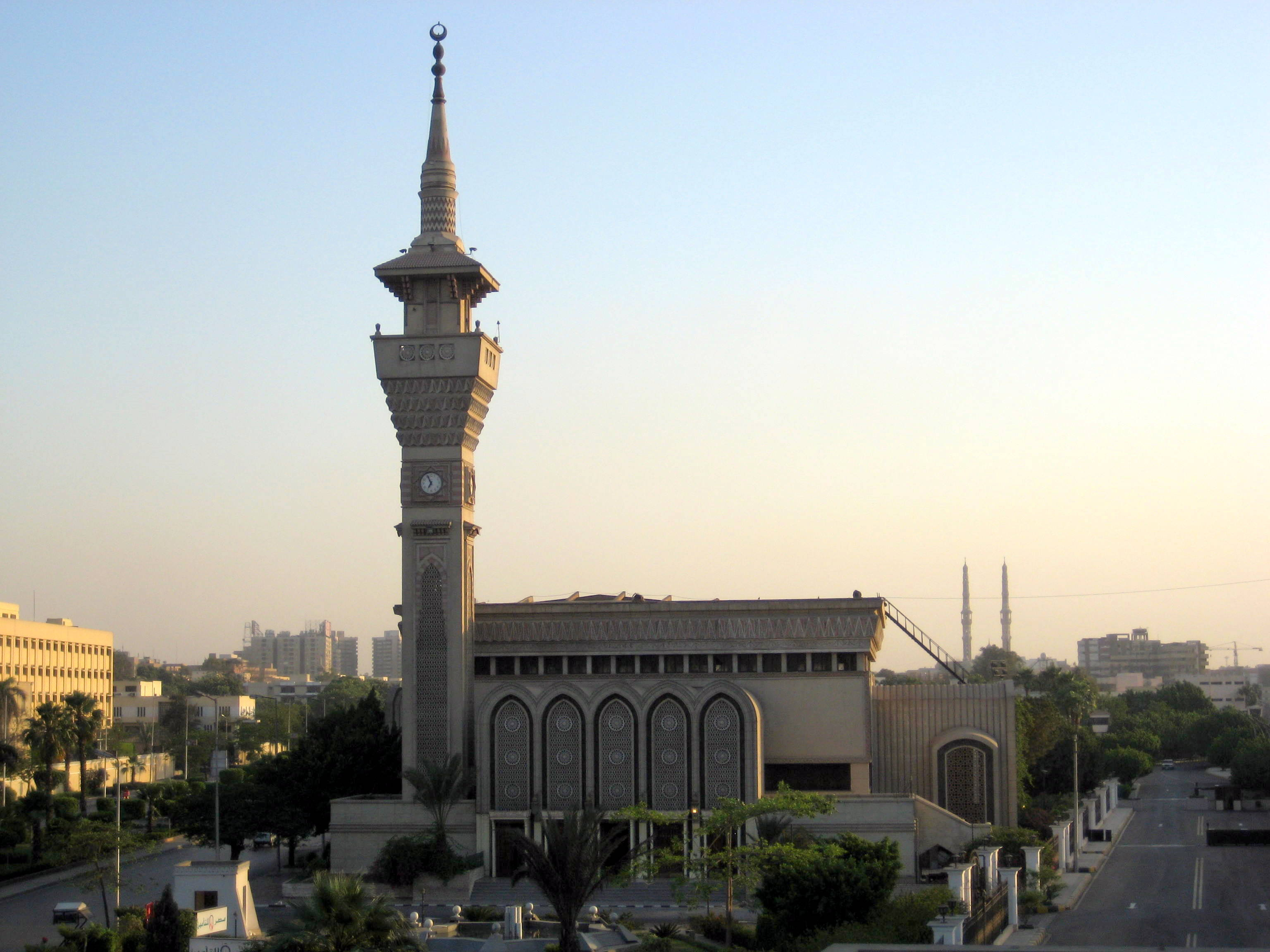
Gamal Abdel Nasser Mosque in Cairo, the site of his burial

Almost immediately after the procession began, mourners engulfed Nasser's coffin chanting, "There is no God but Allah, and Nasser is God's beloved... Each of us is Nasser." Police unsuccessfully attempted to quell the crowds and, as a result, most of the foreign dignitaries were evacuated. The final destination was the Nasr Mosque, which was afterwards renamed Abdel Nasser Mosque, where Nasser was buried.

Because of his ability to motivate nationalistic passions, "men, women, and children wept and wailed in the streets" after hearing of his death, according to Nutting. The general Arab reaction was of mourning, with thousands of people pouring onto the streets of major cities throughout the Arab world. Over a dozen people were killed in Beirut as a result of the chaos, and in Jerusalem, roughly 75,000 Arabs marched through the Old City chanting, "Nasser will never die." As a testament to his unchallenged leadership of the Arab people, following his death, the headline of the Lebanese Le Jour read, "One hundred million human beings—the Arabs—are orphans." Sherif Hetata, a former political prisoner and later member of Nasser's ASU, said that "Nasser's greatest achievement was his funeral. The world will never again see five million people crying together."

== Legacy ==
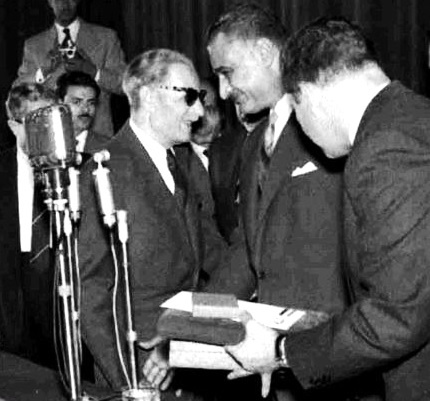
Nasser presenting prominent and blind writer Taha Hussein (standing in front of Nasser) with a national honors prize for literature, 1959

Nasser made Egypt fully independent of British influence, and the country became a major power in the developing world under his leadership. One of Nasser's main domestic efforts was to establish social justice, which he deemed a prerequisite to liberal democracy. During his presidency, ordinary citizens enjoyed unprecedented access to housing, education, jobs, health services and nourishment, as well as other forms of social welfare, while feudalistic influence waned.

However, these advances came at the expense of civil liberties. In Nasser's Egypt, the media were tightly controlled, mail was opened, and telephones were wiretapped. He was elected in 1956, 1958 and 1965 in plebiscites in which he was the sole candidate, each time claiming unanimous or near-unanimous support. With few exceptions, the legislature did little more than approve Nasser's policies. As the legislature was made up almost entirely of government supporters, Nasser effectively held all governing power in the nation.

By the end of his presidency, employment and working conditions improved considerably, although poverty was still high in the country and substantial resources allocated for social welfare had been diverted to the war effort.

The national economy grew significantly through agrarian reform, major modernization projects such as the Helwan steel works and the Aswan Dam, and nationalization schemes such as that of the Suez Canal. However, the marked economic growth of the early 1960s took a downturn for the remainder of the decade, only recovering in 1970. Egypt experienced a "golden age" of culture during Nasser's presidency, according to historian Joel Gordon, particularly in film, television, theater, radio, literature, fine arts, comedy, poetry, and music. Egypt under Nasser dominated the Arab world in these fields, producing cultural icons.

During Mubarak's presidency, Nasserist political parties began to emerge in Egypt, the first being the Arab Democratic Nasserist Party (ADNP). The party carried minor political influence, and splits between its members beginning in 1995 resulted in the gradual establishment of splinter parties, including Hamdeen Sabahi's 1997 founding of Al-Karama. Sabahi came in third place during the 2012 presidential election. Nasserist activists were among the founders of Kefaya, a major opposition force during Mubarak's rule. On 19 September 2012, four Nasserist parties (the ADNP, Karama, the National Conciliation Party, and the Popular Nasserist Congress Party) merged to form the United Nasserist Party.

=== Public image ===
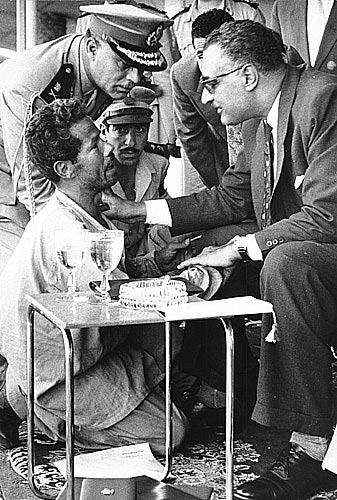
Nasser speaking to a homeless Egyptian man and offering him a job, after the man was found sleeping below the stage where Nasser was seated, 1959

Nasser was known for his accessibility and direct relationship with ordinary Egyptians. His availability to the public, despite assassination attempts against him, was unparalleled among his successors. A skilled orator, Nasser gave 1,359 speeches between 1953 and 1970, a record for any Egyptian head of state. Historian Elie Podeh wrote that a constant theme of Nasser's image was "his ability to represent Egyptian authenticity, in triumph or defeat". The national press also helped to foster his popularity and profile—more so after the nationalization of state media. Historian Tarek Osman wrote:

The interplay in the Nasser 'phenomenon' between genuine expression of popular feeling and state-sponsored propaganda may sometimes be hard to disentangle. But behind it lies a vital historical fact: that Gamal Abdel Nasser signifies the only truly Egyptian developmental project in the country's history since the fall of the Pharaonic state. There had been other projects ... But this was different—in origin, meaning and impact. For Nasser was a man of the Egyptian soil who had overthrown the Middle East's most established and sophisticated monarchy in a swift and bloodless move—to the acclaim of millions of poor, oppressed Egyptians—and ushered in a programme of 'social justice', 'progress and development', and 'dignity'.

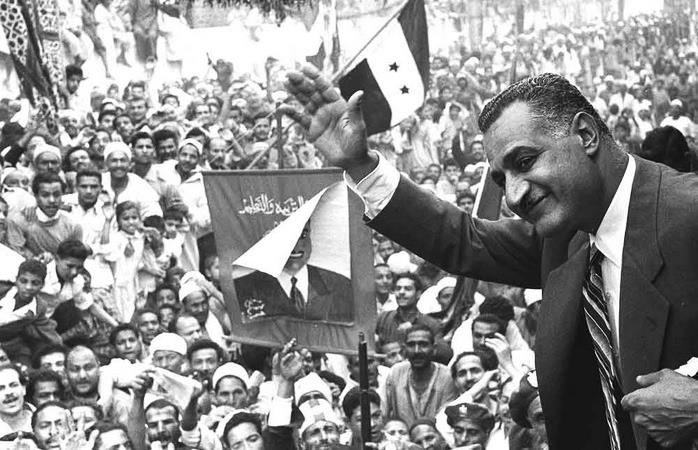
Nasser waving to crowds in Mansoura, 1960

While Nasser was increasingly criticized by Egyptian intellectuals following the Six-Day War and his death in 1970, the general public was persistently sympathetic both during and after Nasser's life. According to political scientist Mahmoud Hamad, writing in 2008, "nostalgia for Nasser is easily sensed in Egypt and all Arab countries today". General malaise in Egyptian society, particularly during the Mubarak era, augmented nostalgia for Nasser's presidency, which increasingly became associated with the ideals of national purpose, hope, social cohesion, and vibrant culture.

Until the present day, Nasser serves as an iconic figure throughout the Arab world, a symbol of Arab unity and dignity, and a towering figure in modern Middle Eastern history. He is also considered a champion of social justice in Egypt. Time writes that despite his mistakes and shortcomings, Nasser "imparted a sense of personal worth and national pride that [Egypt and the Arabs] had not known for 400 years. This alone may have been enough to balance his flaws and failures."

Historian Steven A. Cook wrote in July 2013, "Nasser's heyday still represents, for many, the last time that Egypt felt united under leaders whose espoused principles met the needs of ordinary Egyptians." During the Arab Spring, which resulted in a revolution in Egypt, photographs of Nasser were raised in Cairo and Arab capitals during anti-government demonstrations. According to journalist Lamis Andoni, Nasser had become a "symbol of Arab dignity" during the mass demonstrations.

=== Criticism ===
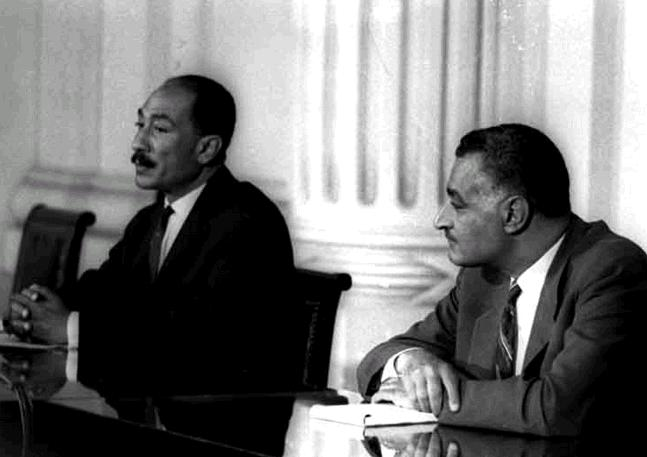
Anwar Sadat (left) and Nasser in the National Assembly, 1964. Sadat succeeded Nasser as president in 1970 and significantly departed from Nasser's policies throughout his rule.

Sadat declared his intention to "continue the path of Nasser" in his 7 October 1970 presidential inauguration speech, but began to depart from Nasserist policies as his domestic position improved following the 1973 October War. President Sadat's Infitah policy sought to open Egypt's economy for private investment. According to Heikal, ensuing anti-Nasser developments until the present day led to an Egypt "[half] at war with Abdel-Nasser, half [at war] with Anwar El-Sadat".

Nasser's Egyptian detractors considered him a dictator who thwarted democratic progress, imprisoned thousands of dissidents, and led a repressive administration responsible for numerous human rights violations. Islamists in Egypt, particularly members of the politically persecuted Brotherhood, viewed Nasser as oppressive, tyrannical, and demonic. Samer S. Shehata, who wrote an article on "The Politics of Laughter: Nasser, Sadat, and Mubarek in Egyptian Political Jokes" noted that "with the new regime came the end of parliamentary politics and political freedoms, including the right to organize political parties, and freedoms of speech and the press". Liberal writer Tawfiq al-Hakim described Nasser as a "confused Sultan" who employed stirring rhetoric, but had no actual plan to achieve his stated goals.

Some of Nasser's liberal and Islamist critics in Egypt, including the founding members of the New Wafd Party and writer Jamal Badawi, dismissed Nasser's popular appeal with the Egyptian masses during his presidency as being the product of successful manipulation and demagoguery. Egyptian political scientist Alaa al-Din Desouki blamed the 1952 revolution's shortcomings on Nasser's concentration of power, and Egypt's lack of democracy on Nasser's political style and his government's limitations on freedom of expression and political participation. American political scientist Mark Cooper asserted that Nasser's charisma and his direct relationship with the Egyptian people "rendered intermediaries (organizations and individuals) unnecessary". He opined that Nasser's legacy was a "guarantee of instability" due to Nasser's reliance on personal power and the absence of strong political institutions under his rule. Historian Abd al-Azim Ramadan wrote that Nasser was an irrational and irresponsible leader, blaming his inclination to solitary decision-making for Egypt's losses during the Suez War, among other events. Miles Copeland, Jr., a Central Intelligence Agency officer known for his close personal relationship with Nasser, said that the barriers between Nasser and the outside world have grown so thick that all but the information that attest to his infallibility, indispensability, and immortality has been filtered out.

Zakaria Mohieddin, who was Nasser's vice president, said that Nasser gradually changed during his reign. He ceased consulting his colleagues and made more and more of the decisions himself. Although Nasser repeatedly said that a war with Israel will start at a time of his, or Arab, choosing, in 1967 he started a bluffing game "but a successful bluff means your opponent must not know which cards you are holding. In this case Nasser's opponent could see his hand in the mirror and knew he was only holding a pair of deuces" and Nasser knew that his army is not prepared yet. "All of this was out of character...His tendencies in this regard may have been accentuated by diabetes... That was the only rational explanation for his actions in 1967".

==== Antisemitism ====
During an interview with Gerhard Frey in the German neo-Nazi newspaper National-Zeitung on May 1, 1964, Nasser said that "no person, not even the most simple one, takes seriously the lie of the six million Jews that were murdered [in the Holocaust]." However, he is not known to have ever again publicly called the figure of six million into question, perhaps because his advisors and East German contacts had advised him on the subject. Nasser, convinced of its authenticity, also encouraged the distribution of the antisemitic fabrication The Protocols of the Elders of Zion. He believed that the Jews greatly influenced the global financial market and that they ultimately strove for world domination. Nasser also hired Johann von Leers, a former Nazi official, who distributed antisemitic propaganda. He is, however, considered by authors Jeffrey Herf and Norman Stillman to have been less explicitly prejudiced than rival political powers such as the Muslim Brotherhood.

=== Regional leadership ===
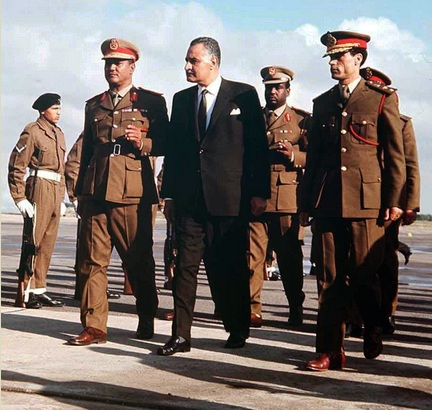
Jaafar Nimeiry of Sudan (left), Nasser, and Muammar Gaddafi of Libya (right) at the Tripoli Airport, 1969. Nimeiry and Gaddafi were influenced by Nasser's pan-Arabist ideas and the latter sought to succeed him as "leader of the Arabs".

Through his actions and speeches, and because he was able to symbolize the popular Arab will, Nasser inspired several nationalist revolutions in the Arab world. He defined the politics of his generation and communicated directly with the public masses of the Arab world, bypassing the various heads of states of those countries—an accomplishment not repeated by other Arab leaders. The extent of Nasser's centrality in the region made it a priority for incoming Arab nationalist heads of state to seek good relations with Egypt, in order to gain popular legitimacy from their own citizens.

To varying degrees, Nasser's statist system of government was continued in Egypt and emulated by virtually all Arab republics, namely Algeria, Syria, Iraq, Tunisia, Yemen, Sudan, and Libya. Ahmed Ben Bella, Algeria's first president, was a staunch Nasserist. Abdullah al-Sallal drove out the king of North Yemen in the name of Nasser's pan-Arabism. Other coups influenced by Nasser included those that occurred in Iraq in July 1958 and Syria in 1963. Muammar Gaddafi, who overthrew the Libyan monarchy in 1969, considered Nasser his hero and sought to succeed him as "leader of the Arabs". Also in 1969, Colonel Gaafar Nimeiry, a supporter of Nasser, took power in Sudan. The Arab Nationalist Movement (ANM) helped spread Nasser's pan-Arabist ideas throughout the Arab world, particularly among the Palestinians, Syrians, and Lebanese, and in South Yemen, the Persian Gulf, and Iraq. While many regional heads of state tried to emulate Nasser, Podeh opined that the "parochialism" of successive Arab leaders "transformed imitation [of Nasser] into parody".

=== Portrayal in film ===
In 1963, Egyptian director Youssef Chahine produced the film El Nasser Salah El Dine ("Saladin The Victorious"), which intentionally drew parallels between Saladin, considered a hero in the Arab world, and Nasser and his pan-Arabist policies. Nasser is played by Ahmed Zaki in Mohamed Fadel's 1996 Nasser 56. The film set the Egyptian box office record at the time, and focused on Nasser during the Suez Crisis. It is also considered a milestone in Egyptian and Arab cinema as the first film to dramatize the role of a modern-day Arab leader. Together with the 1999 Syrian biopic Gamal Abdel Nasser, the films marked the first biographical movies about contemporary public figures produced in the Arab world. He is portrayed by Amir Boutrous in the Netflix television series The Crown. Nasser is also portrayed by Amr Saad in the 2025 Egyptian film El Sett, a biopic about the iconic Egyptian singer and actress Umm Kulthum.

== Personal life ==
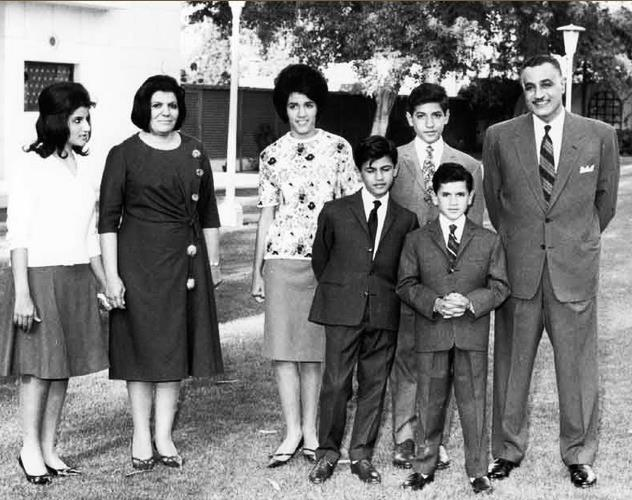
Nasser and his family in Manshiyat al-Bakri, 1963. From left to right, his daughter Mona, his wife Tahia Kazem, daughter Hoda, son Abdel Hakim, son Khaled, son Abdel Hamid, and Nasser.

In 1944, Nasser married Tahia Kazem (1920–1992), the daughter of a wealthy Iranian father and an Egyptian mother, both of whom had died when she was young. She had been introduced to Nasser through her brother, Abdel Hamid Kazim, a merchant friend of Nasser's, in 1943. After their wedding, the couple moved into a house in Manshiyat al-Bakri, a suburb of Cairo, where they lived for the rest of their lives. Nasser's entry into the officer corps in 1937 secured him relatively well-paid employment in a society where most people lived in poverty. Nasser and Tahia would sometimes discuss politics at home, but for the most part Nasser kept his career separate from his family life. He preferred to spend most of his free time with his children.

Nasser and Tahia had two daughters and three sons:

- Hoda, b. 1945.
- Mona, b. 1947.
- Khalid, 1949–2011. The most active politically. Said to have co-founded (with Egyptian diplomat Mahmoud Noureddin) a secret leftist organization, Egypt's Revolution (Thawrat Miṣr), which was accused of assassinating Israeli members of the Shin Bet stationed in Egypt in the late 1980s. Khalid took refuge in Yugoslavia and was eventually pardoned by President Hosni Mubarak.
- Abd al-Hamid, b. 1951.
- Abd al-Hakim, b. 1955. Appears regularly in Egyptian and regional media, heads the museum dedicated to the life of his father.

Although he was a proponent of secular politics, Nasser was an observant Muslim who made the Hajj pilgrimage to Mecca in 1954 and 1965. He was known to be personally incorruptible, a characteristic which further enhanced his reputation among the citizens of Egypt and the Arab world. Nasser's personal hobbies included playing chess, photography, watching American films, reading Arabic, English, and French magazines, and listening to classical music.

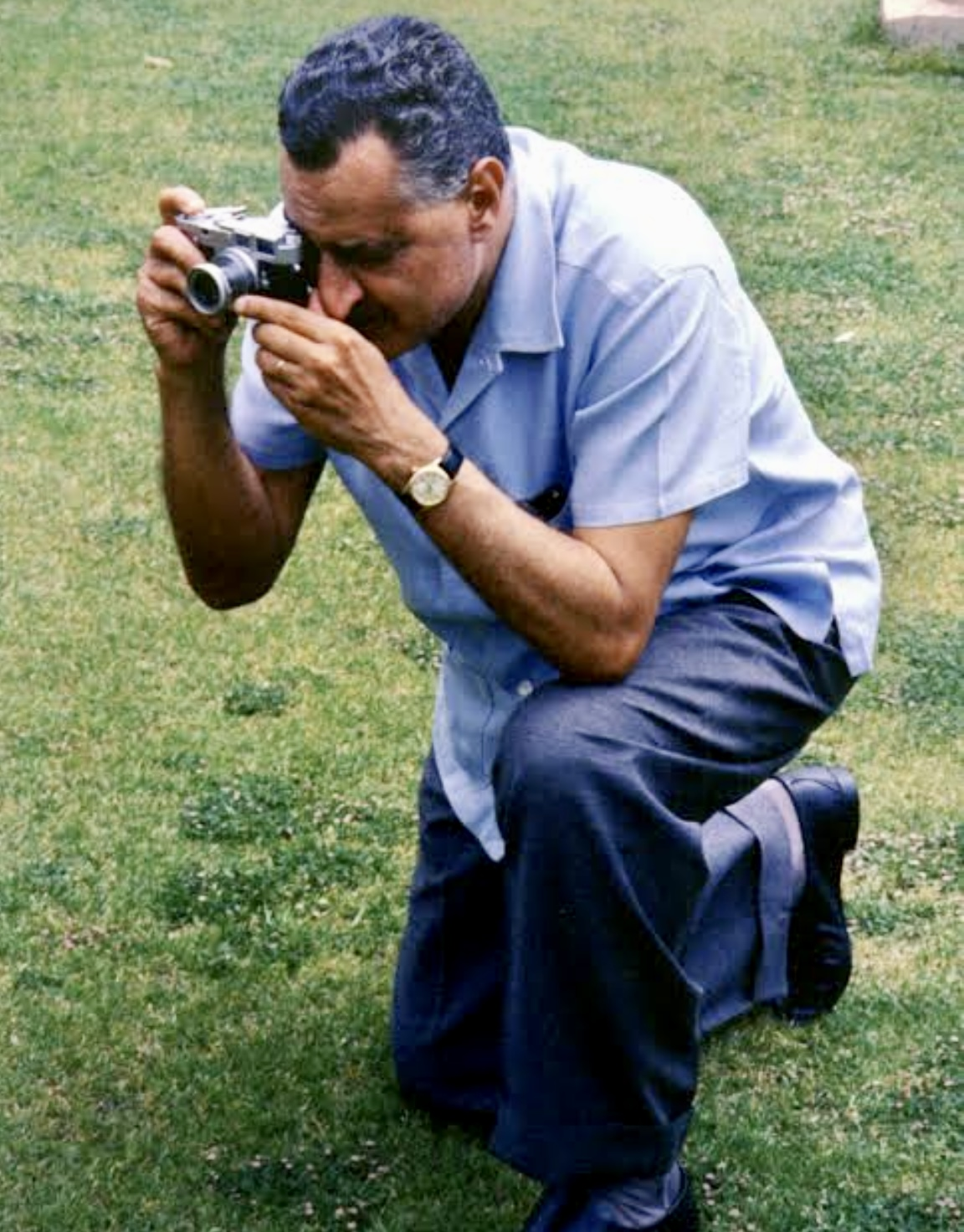
Nasser practices photography at his home in Cairo, 1969

Nasser was a chain smoker. He maintained 18-hour workdays and rarely took time off for vacations. The combination of smoking and working long hours contributed to his poor health. He was diagnosed with diabetes in the early 1960s and by the time of his death in 1970, he also had arteriosclerosis, heart disease, and high blood pressure. He suffered two major heart attacks (in 1966 and 1969), and was on bed rest for six weeks after the second episode. State media reported that Nasser's absence from the public view at that time was a result of influenza.

== Writings ==
Nasser wrote the following books, published during his lifetime:

- Memoirs of the First Palestine War (Arabic: يوميات الرئيس جمال عبد الناصر عن حرب فلسطين) (1955; Akher Sa'a)
  - "Memoirs of the First Palestine War", in 2, no. 2 (Win. 73): 3–32 (First English translation, 1973, pdf-file from Journal of Palestine Studies)
- Egypt's Liberation: The Philosophy of the Revolution (Arabic: فلسفة الثورة) (1955; Dar al-Maaref)
  - Egypt's liberation; the philosophy of the revolution, introduced by Dorothy Thompson (Washington: Public Affairs Press, 1955)
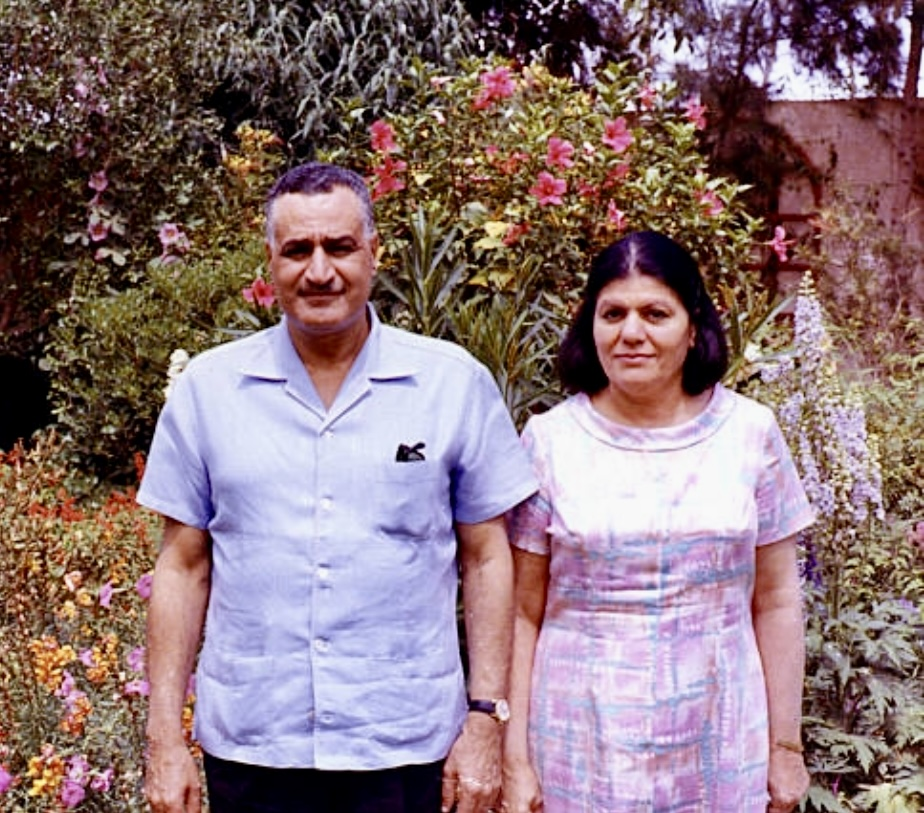
- Nasser with his wife Tahia in his home in Cairo in 1969
  Towards Freedom (Arabic: في سبيل الحرية) (1959; Cairo-Arabian Company)

== Honours ==
Foreign honours

- Czechoslovakia: Collar Grand Cross of the Order of the White Lion (1966)
- East Germany: First Class of the Star of People's Friendship (1965)
- Finland: Grand Cross with Collar of the Order of the White Rose of Finland (1967)
- Malaysia: Honorary Recipient of the Order of the Crown of the Realm (DMN (K)) (1965)
- Polish People's Republic: Grand Cross of the Order of Polonia Restituta
- Singapore: Darjah Utama Temasek (1964)
- South Africa: Supreme Commander of the Order of the Companions of O. R. Tambo (2004)
- Soviet Union:
  - Hero of the Soviet Union (1964)
  - Order of Lenin
- Tunisia: Grand Cordon of the Order of the Republic (1965)
- Yugoslavia: Great Star of the Order of the Yugoslav Star (1955)

== See also ==
- History of Egypt under Gamal Abdel Nasser
- List of presidents of Egypt
- List of prime ministers of Egypt
- Suez Crisis
- Six-Day War
- War of Attrition
- Closure of the Suez Canal (1967–1975)

== Notes ==
Political offices
Preceded by Mohamed Naguib	President of Egypt; 1954–1970	Succeeded by Anwar Sadat
Preceded by Mohamed Naguib	Prime Minister of Egypt; 1954	Succeeded by Mohamed Naguib
Preceded by Mohamed Naguib	Prime Minister of Egypt; 1954–1962	Succeeded by Ali Sabri
Preceded by Mohamed Sedki Sulayman	Prime Minister of Egypt; 1967–1970	Succeeded by Mahmoud Fawzi
Preceded by Josip Broz Tito	Secretary-General of the Non-Aligned Movement; 1964–1970	Succeeded by Kenneth Kaunda
