= Beni Mur =

Beni Mur بني مر Bani Murr
- Location in Egypt
- Coordinates: 27°13′25″N 31°11′35″E
- Country: Egypt
- Governorate: Asyut Governorate
- Time zone: UTC+2 (EET)
  - Summer (DST): UTC+3 (EEST)

Beni Mur (Arabic: بني مر, also spelled Bani Murr) is an Egyptian town in Upper Egypt located 8 kilometers north of the city of Asyut.

== History ==
The town is believed to be the site of Deir Abu as-Sira (a corrupted form of the name Theodor (Ancient Greek: Θεόδωρος)), a monastery dedicated to Saint George.

Today Beni Mur is the site of the Church of Saint George which is visited annually on 1 May by local Coptic pilgrims. The church is small, with two altars, dedicated to Saint George and the Mary.

According to local tradition, the town was named after the Beni Mur elites who hailed from the Hejaz region, ruled over the rural town during the Muslim conquest of North Africa, and are attributed with promoting the Classical Arabic language and early teachings of Islam among the locals.

The former Egyptian president Gamal Abdel Nasser's father was born in 1888 in Beni Mur.

A small mosque was built in the town in 1898 and the first primary school was opened in 1900, consisting of a single room.

== Bibliography ==
- Aburish, Said K. (2004), Nasser, the Last Arab, New York City: St. Martin's Press, ISBN 978-0-312-28683-5
- Joesten, Joachim (1974), Nasser: The Rise to Power, Long Acre, London: Odhams Press Limited, OCLC 317256563
- Meinardus, Otto Friedrich (2002), Two Thousand Years of Coptic Christianity, Cairo: American Univ in Cairo Press, ISBN 977-424-757-4
- Stephens, Robert Henry (1972), Nasser: A Political Biography, New York: Simon & Schuster, ISBN 978-0-671-21224-7
