= Sulayman Hafez =

Egyptian lawyer and politician

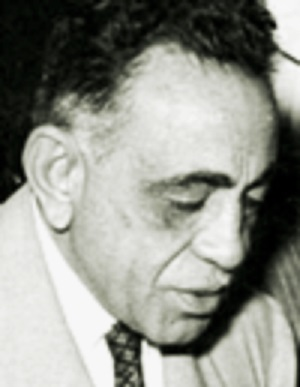
Sulayman Hafez

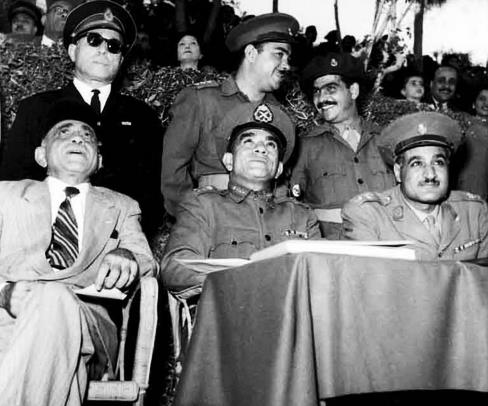
Hafez seated first from left. Next to him are Muhammad Naguib and Gamal Abdel Nasser, November 1952

Sulayman Hafez was an Egyptian lawyer and politician. Hafez drafted the abdication letter of King Farouk and negotiated his stepping down following the Egyptian Revolution of 1952.

In early 1953, following the revolution, Hafez was selected by the Revolutionary Command Council (RCC) to serve as both Deputy Prime Minister and Interior Minister in the government of Prime Minister Muhammad Naguib, the senior officer who took part in the overthrow of King Farouk. He handpicked all but two of the ministers in the cabinet and his relatively young appointees consisted of technocrats, members of the youth wing of the Nationalist Party of Fathi Radwan and two associates of the Muslim Brotherhood.

Hafez became one of the chief antagonist against the Wafd Party in Egypt following the revolution. He sought to have Mustafa el-Nahhas ousted as the party's president, penning a letter on behalf of the revolutionary officers that described el-Nahhas as a "tumour in the body politic." At the time, there were sharp internal divisions within the party, with the young guard seeking to show more flexibility towards the officers and viewing the old guard, represented by el-Nahhas, as being out of touch. El-Nahhas had refused to negotiate the party's renewal of license with President Naguib as long as party veteran Fouad Serageddin remained imprisoned. However, he eventually relented after significant defections from the party and submitted the application to Hafez's interior ministry.

Hafez, a major legal figure prior the revolution, was among the law-based civilian allies of Naguib, which also included Abd El-Razzak El-Sanhuri. Naguib's appointment of Hafez to the interior ministry, which was responsible for domestic security among other tasks, was seen by later historians as weakening his hand. Gamal Abdel Nasser, the officer who led the revolution, managed to take advantage of the appointment by easily managing to appoint himself to both of Hafez's positions in June 1953, amid the growing rivalry between Nasser and Naguib. Hafez then became the official legal adviser Naguib. While Naguib drew on constitutional lawyers and the leaders of pre-revolutionary political parties, Nasser surrounded himself with his fellow officers. Hafez resigned from his advisory position on 27 March 1954 as tensions between Nasser and Naguib escalated.

== Bibliography ==
- Gordon, Joel (1991). Nasser's Blessed Movement : Egypt's Free Officers and the July Revolution. Oxford University Press. ISBN 9780195361568.
- Kandil, Hazem (2012). Soldiers, Spies and Statesmen: Egypt's Road to Revolt. Verso Books. ISBN 9781844679614.
