= 1965 United Arab Republic presidential confirmation referendum =

- 15 March 1965
- Registered: 7,055,564
- Turnout: 98.51%
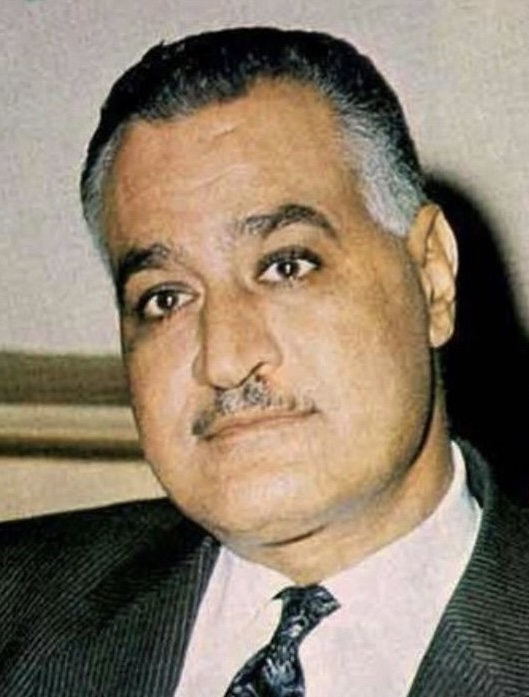
Nominee	Gamal Abdel Nasser
Party	ASU
Popular vote	6,950,098
Percentage	100.00%
President before election
Gamal Abdel Nasser
ASU
Elected President
Gamal Abdel Nasser
ASU

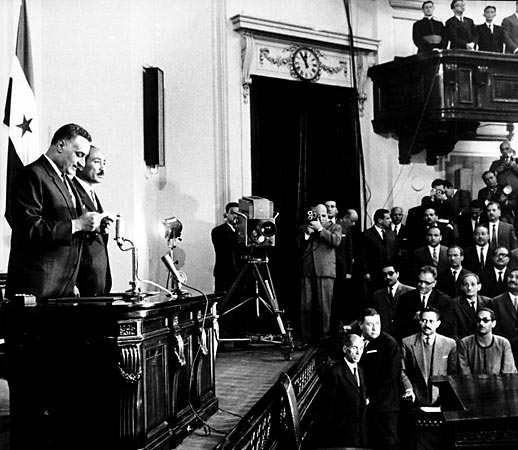
Nasser being sworn in for his second term, March 1965

Presidential elections were held in the United Arab Republic (now Egypt) on 15 March 1965. The election took the form of a referendum on the candidacy of Gamal Abdel Nasser, who ran unopposed. He allegedly won with almost seven million votes, and only 65 against. Voter turnout was stated to be 99%.

== Results ==
Candidate	Party	Votes	%
Gamal Abdel Nasser	Arab Socialist Union	6,950,098	100.00
Against		65	0.00
Total		6,950,163	100.00
Valid votes		6,950,163	99.99
Invalid/blank votes		489	0.01
Total votes		6,950,652	100.00
Registered voters/turnout		7,055,564	98.51
Source: Nohlen et al.
