= Attempted assassination of Gamal Abdel Nasser =

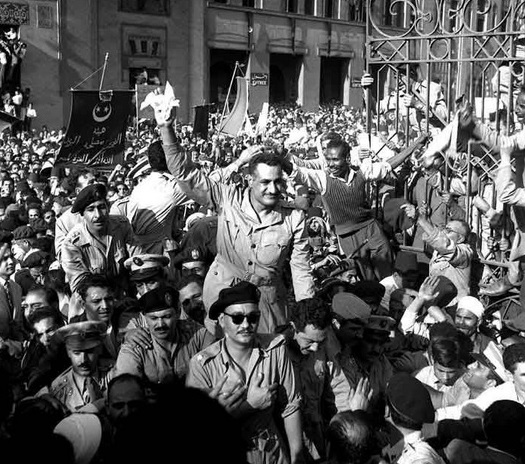
- Nasser greeted by crowds in Alexandria one day after his announcement of the British withdrawal and the assassination attempt against him, 27 October 1954.
- Location: Manshiyya, Alexandria, Egypt
- Date: 26 October 1954
- Target: Gamal Abdel Nasser
- Attack type: Shooting
- Deaths: None
- Injuries: 2 dignitaries
- Perpetrator: Muslim Brotherhood (denied)
- Motive: Regime change

On 26 October 1954, Egyptian president Gamal Abdel Nasser narrowly survived an assassination attempt while giving a public speech in Manshiyya, Alexandria. Mahmoud Abdel-Latif, a member of the Muslim Brotherhood, fired eight shots at Nasser, all of which missed, although two dignitaries were slightly injured by shattered glass. The failed attempt escalated tensions between Nasser's secular Arab nationalist regime and the Brotherhood, culminating in a nationwide crackdown on all political opponents. The event also consolidated Nasser's power, allowing him to overthrow Mohamed Naguib and formally assume the presidency. The incident has been referred to as the Manshiyya incident.

== Background ==
Although the Muslim Brotherhood initially supported the Free Officers Movement, led by Gamal Abdel Nasser, in overthrowing the British-backed Egyptian monarchy, relations between the two soured after the 1952 Egyptian revolution. Hoping that the coup would pave the way for the implementation of an Islamist government, the Muslim Brotherhood felt betrayed and sidelined after realizing Nasser's unwillingness to share power with the Brotherhood or fulfil its Islamist agenda. Tensions stemmed from the ideological divide between the two: Nasser sought to implement secularism and Arab nationalism in Egypt, while the Muslim Brotherhood advocated for the establishment of an Islamic state based on religious principles. The brotherhood and the ruling Revolutionary Command Council had disagreements over introducing Sharia-based legislation, which the former had been avid proponents of.

== Assassination attempt ==
Sound recording of the assassination attempt
With English subtitles

The assassination attempt took place on 26 October 1954, while Nasser was delivering a speech in Alexandria celebrating British military withdrawal, which was broadcast to the Arab world by radio. The gunman, a thirty-year old Muslim Brotherhood member named Mahmoud Abdel-Latif, was 25 feet (7.6 m) away from Nasser and fired eight shots at him as he spoke from a third-floor balcony, but all missed Nasser. Two seated dignitaries were slightly injured by broken glass.

While panic broke out among the audience, Nasser maintained his posture and raised his voice to appeal for calm. He then exclaimed the following with great emotion:

My countrymen, my blood spills for you and for Egypt. I will live for your sake and die for the sake of your freedom and honor. Let them kill me; it does not concern me so long as I have instilled pride, honor, and freedom in you. If Gamal Abdel Nasser should die, each of you shall be Gamal Abdel Nasser ... Gamal Abdel Nasser is of you and from you and he is willing to sacrifice his life for the nation.

== Aftermath ==
Following the failed assassination, Nasser initiated a widespread crackdown campaign on the Muslim Brotherhood. On 29 October, the Egyptian government officially dissolved the Muslim Brotherhood. On 13 November, Nasser deposed president Mohamed Naguib, who was implicated in the assassination attempt, and placed him under house arrest. This allowed Nasser to formally assume the presidency.

=== Raids in Egypt ===
The military regime raided several offices and branches across Egypt belonging to the Muslim Brotherhood and imprisoned over 4,000 of the group's members. Seven senior leaders of the organization were sentenced to death, six of which – including Mahmoud Abdel-Latif – were executed on 7 December 1954, while the remainder, Sayyid Qutb, had his sentence commuted to imprisonment for life. Nasser used the assassination attempt as a pretext to crack down on political opponents, particularly the Muslim Brotherhood, by utilizing mass arrests, torture, and executions in order to consolidate his power. The once influential Muslim Brotherhood was forced to go underground and begin clandestine activities.
