= United Nasserist Party =

Political party

- Ideology: Nasserism
- National affiliation: National Salvation Front

The United Nasserist Party, also translated as the Unified Nasserist Party, is a political party formed by the merger of four different parties.

The parties which agreed to merge were the: Arab Democratic Nasserist Party, the Dignity Party, the National Conciliation Party and the Nasserist Popular Conference Party.
