= Iskandar Habash =

- إسكندر حبش
- Born: 6 November 1963; Beirut
- Died: 30 October 2025 (aged 61); Beirut
- Occupation(s): Poet, journalist and translator

Iskandar Habash (Arabic: إسكندر حبش, romanized: Iskandar Ḥabash; 6 November 1963 – 30 October 2025) was a Lebanese poet, journalist, and translator of Palestinian origin.

== Biography ==
Iskandar Habash was born in Beirut on 6 November 1963. His family originated from Lidd, from which they were displaced during the 1948 Palestine war. He contributed to the publication of several poetry magazines in the 1980s and oversaw the cultural section of the newspaper As-Safir. He died in Beirut on 30 October 2025.

== Works ==
Iskandar Habash mainly published poetry, including:

- Būrtrīh rajul min maʻdan (Arabic: بورتريه رجل من معدن), 1988
- Niṣf Tuffāḥat (Arabic: نصف تفاحة), 1993
- Ashkw al-kharīf (Arabic: أشكو الخريف), 2003
- Lā Amal lī bi-hādhā al-ṣamt (Arabic: لا أمل لي بهذا الصمت), 2009
- Lā Shayʼ akthar min Hādhā al-thalj (Arabic: لا شيء أكثر من هذا الثلج), 2013

Moreover, Habash actively translated books in Arabic, including the works of Fernando Pessoa, Émile Zola...
