= Yusef Urabi =

Fatah commander (died 1966)

Yusef Urabi (Arabic: يوسف عرابي; also spelled Yusuf Orabi) was a Palestinian officer in the Syrian Army as well as an early member of Fatah's armed wing, al-Assifa. In 1966 he was killed in the Yarmouk Camp in Damascus during an attempt to ease tensions between Palestinian leaders Yasser Arafat and Ahmed Jibril.

== Military career ==
Urabi served as a major for one of the regular Palestinian Liberation Army (PLA) units within the Syrian Army. He sympathized with Ba'athism, an ideology promoting pan-Arabism and socialism and was a close military adviser and friend of Hafez al-Assad. Urabi enlisted with al-Assifa, the armed wing of Fatah, in the late 1950s.

Al-Assad, who was Defense Minister at the time, selected Urabi in 1966 to head the operations of Fatah—which was based in Syria—and instructed Yasser Arafat and other Fatah leaders to recognize Urabi's authority.

== Death ==
On 5 May 1966, during a meeting chaired by Urabi to alleviate tensions between Arafat and Ahmed Jibril in the Yarmouk Refugee Camp, Urabi was assassinated. Consequently, Arafat along with his aide Khalil al-Wazir and several other Fatah officials were arrested and imprisoned on al-Assad's orders. Al-Assad personally interrogated al-Wazir and the officials who denied being present at the scene.

The circumstances of Urabi's killing at Yarmouk are disputed. Al-Wazir claimed that al-Assad, Jibril and the Military Intelligence Directorate had planned to assassinate Arafat using Urabi to lure the latter into a trap. Jibril aborted the meeting at the last minute and Arafat also did not attend without notifying Jibril. Instead, the former sent a Palestinian Syrian Army officer named Adnan and the latter sent a colleague, Mohammed Hishme with bodyguard Abdul Majib Zahmud who was to remain outside of the meeting. According to Zahmud, a loud argument took place with Adnan yelling at Urabi. Then, Adnan allegedly shot and killed both Urabi and Hishme before fleeing the scene. Arafat and al-Wazir were arrested, but both claimed they were not present at the scene because of an emergency meeting with another intelligence officer, Ahmed Sweidani. They were later pardoned by President Salah Jadid after Sweidany confirmed their statement.

In contrast, according to Palestinian writer Said Aburish, Urabi was defenestrated from a third-floor window and died immediately. While Arafat was not present when Syrian police arrived to the crime scene, he had sought refuge in a Syrian police coronel house. He then pleaded President Jedid for protection, but was subsequently detained by police on al-Assad orders. Arafat and al-Wazir were moved to the Mezzah prison and kept in solitary confinement. Assad appointed a three-man jury to investigate the case, which found Arafat guilty, sentencing him to death. But finally Jedid released Arafat and closed the file.

== Bibliography ==
- Aburish, Saïd K. (1998). Arafat: From Defender to Dictator. Bloomsbury Publishing. p. 63. ISBN 0747544301. "Yusuf Orabi."
- Hart, Alan (1989). Arafat, a Political Biography. Indiana University Press. p. 205. ISBN 0253327113. "Yusef Urabi."
- Hart, Alan (2010). Zionism the Real Enemy of the Jews. SCB Distributors. ISBN 978-0932863690.
- Kiernan, Thomas (1976). Yasir Arafat: The Man and the Myth. Abacus. ISBN 0349120897.
- Rapoport, David C. (2006). Terrorism: The third or new left wave. Taylor & Francis. ISBN 0415316537.
- Rubin, Barry (2005). Yasir Arafat: A Political Biography. Oxford University Press. ISBN 0195181271.
- United States. Joint Publications Research Service (1993). JPRS report: Near East & South Asia. Foreign Broadcast Information Service.
