= Lod massacre =

Lod massacre may refer to:

- Lod Airport massacre (1972)
- Lydda massacre (1948)
