= Feras Milhem =

Acting Governor of the Palestine Monetary Authority
- Incumbent
- Assumed office January 2021
- Preceded by: Azzam Shawwa

Feras Milhem is a Palestinian lawyer who served as the Governor of the Palestine Monetary Authority (PMA) since January 2021. He took over as Governor after the end of Azzam Shawwa's term as Governor.
