= Falastinuna =

Palestinian political magazine (1959–1968)

- Editor: Khalil Al Wazir; Tawfiq Khoury
- Categories: Political magazine
- Frequency: Monthly
- Founder: Yasser Arafat; Khalil Al Wazir
- Founded: 1959
- First issue: November 1959
- Final issue: 1968
- Country: Lebanon
- Based in: Beirut
- Language: Arabic

Falastinuna, Nida' Al Hayat (Arabic: فلسطيننا نداء الحياة, romanized: Falasṭīnunā Nidāʾ al-Ḥayāh, lit. 'Our Palestine: the Call to Life')., or simply Falastinuna (Arabic: فلسطيننا, lit. 'Our Palestine') was a political magazine which was the first publication of the Fatah movement. It was in circulation between 1959 and 1968. The magazine was started by Yasser Arafat and Khalil Al Wazir.

== History and profile ==
Falastinuna was established in 1959, and its first issue appeared in November that year. The founders of the magazine were two leading Palestinian figures, Yaser Arafat and Khalil Al Wazir. The magazine was the official media outlet of the Fatah group, and the name of the Fatah was first expressed in the magazine.

Falastinuna was a thirty-page monthly magazine which was headquartered in Beirut, Lebanon. Its masthead did not mention the names of the editors and contributors, and a post office box was given as its address. However, it was not an underground publication and was sold publicly, but it had no license.

The editors of Falastinuna were Al Wazir and Tawfiq Khoury who was also the publisher of the magazine. Khoury was a member of the Lebanese Ubad Al Rahman Association which helped the establishment of the magazine. In addition, he was a member of the Muslim Brotherhood in Lebanon. In his memoirs Ibrahim Ghosheh, former member of the Muslim Brotherhood and former spokesman of Hamas, stated that at that time there was no difference of opinion between them and that the magazine was financially supported by the exiled members of the Muslim Brotherhood in Kuwait. He also added that Khalil Al Wazir was among the Muslim Brotherhood members.

The circulation of Falastinuna was very low in the initial phase, and it did not contain any advertisement. The magazine was distributed in the Arab countries, but its distribution was limited in Egypt and Syria which had a rigid censorship policy. It was officially banned in the Arab countries in the mid-1970s which was then distributed clandestinely in these countries. As a result the magazine was mostly distributed in the European countries, including West Germany.

The Israeli authorities did not notice Falastinuna until the middle of 1964. The magazine ceased publication in 1968. It produced a total of forty issues during its run.

== Goals and content ==
The slogan of Falastinuna declared that a "long-range, popular armed revolution is the path to the liberation of Falastin." Its major goal was to present and disclose the views and political stance of the Fatah movement between its start in 1959 and 1964. It played a significant role in recruiting members of the Fatah from the Arab world and facilitated interactions between the Fatah members and the Palestinians living in various regions. Moshe Shemesh, an Israeli writer and former intelligence officer, states that Falastinuna achieved these goals. The magazine employed a religious language to attract the attention of the Palestinian refugees in Gaza who came from rural and conservative backgrounds.

The program of the Fatah was published in Falastinuna in November 1959 which focused on Palestinian nationalism as the solution to the Palestinian crisis. The articles in the magazine made it clear that the Palestinian people not the Arab states were the only representative authority on this crisis. The reason for this claim was the failure of the Arab states to regain Palestine. However, as Hani Al Hasan stated, these early writings lacked a well-established theoretical framework. For instance, a concrete reference to the Palestinians appeared only in the fourth issue. The magazine's references to the term became both more frequent and more detailed from this issue. The other significant message given in the magazine was that the Palestinian national movement had to be ready for a long-term armed struggle like that of the Algerians and of the Vietnamese which should be supported by the Arabs and the other similar movements in the Third World countries.

In each issue Falastinuna called its readers as The Children of the Catastrophe. The magazine had the following sections which were all about the Palestine-related events: editorial, reports, poems, letters and slogans. There was a regular column in the magazine entitled Our Opinion of which the writer was anonymous, but David Hirst argued that this column was written by Khalil Al Wazir. Yasser Arafat published articles in Falastinuna to address the Palestinian refugees and the Palestinian diaspora.

Falastinuna included many unsympathetic views about the Jordanian rulers, members of the Hashemite dynasty from the 196os. The magazine featured articles about several massacres carried out by Israeli forces against Palestinians such as the 1948 Deir Yassin massacre and the 1953 Qibya massacre. However, it failed to mention the Kafr Qasim massacre occurred in 1956. For the contributors of the magazine in 1964 the Palestine Liberation Organization was not so significant for their struggle in that it was established by the Arab states. In the September 1964 issue Falastinuna replied a remark by Israel, "I am here by the sword.", completing it as follows: "[I am here by the sword] and only by the sword shall Israel be driven out."
