= Ibrahim Ghosheh =

Palestinian political leader (1936–2021)

- إبراهيم غوشة
- Born: 26 November 1936; Jerusalem, Mandate Palestine
- Died: 26 August 2021 (aged 84); Amman, Jordan
- Burial place: Shafa Badran cemetery, Amman
- Education: University of Cairo
- Occupation: Civil engineer
- Years active: 1960s–1999

Ibrahim Ghosheh (Arabic: إبراهيم غوشة; 1936–2021) was a Palestinian civil engineer. He was a member of the Muslim Brotherhood and joined the Hamas in 1989. He served as the latter's spokesperson between 1992 and 1999.

== Early life and education ==
Ghosheh was born in the Saadia neighborhood of Jerusalem on 26 November 1936. He was a graduate of the Rashidiya School in Jerusalem. His family had to leave Jerusalem during the Nakba in 1948, and they settled in Jericho.

Ghosheh obtained a degree in civil engineering in 1961 from the Cairo University. During his university studies he became a member of the Palestinian Students’ League.

== Career and activities ==
Following his graduation Ghosheh worked in the Jordan Valley as an engineer (1961–62). Between 1962 and 1966 he worked in the Kuwait municipality. He settled in Jordan in 1966 and was employed as an engineer in the Khaled Dam project until 1971. He worked in the Kuwait Towers project for one year from 1971 to 1972. Next, he worked as the manager of the King Talal Dam in Jordan between 1972 and 1978. He was a freelance engineer from 1978 to 1989.

Ghosheh was affiliated with the Palestinian branches of the Egyptian Muslim Brotherhood from 1950s. Tahsin Khreis, a leader of the movement in Jordan, along with Ghosheh, sought to lay a realistic foundation as a "practical Jihad" and were critical of group-think within the organization prior to its detection and 1970 suppression by Jordanian authorities. Ghosheh was elected as the head of the Muslim Brotherhood faction in the Jordanian Engineers Association in 1973.

Ghosheh joined the Hamas in 1989. He was named as the head of its information service and spokesman in late 1992 based in Amman. He was also a member of the Hamas political bureau which was established in Amman in 1996. While serving in these posts Ghosheh also acted as the envoy of Hamas to Tunisia, Syria and other Arab countries. He was arrested by the Jordanian security forces and detained for a short time in 1997.

The Jordanian government issued an arrest warrant for Ghosheh and other leading Hamas figures living in Jordan such as Khaled Mashal, Mousa Abu Marzook, and Sami Khater at the end of August 1999. They were arrested at Amman airport on 22 September 1999 when they were returning from an official visit to Tehran, Iran. They were detained on the charge of being members of the illegal group, namely Hamas. Later Mashal and Ghosheh were also charged with possessing weapons and raising funds for Hamas. They started a hunger strike immediately after their arrest.

Ghosheh, Mashal and Khater were deported to Qatar on 22 November 1999. Ghosheh's tenure as the spokesperson of Hamas ended in 1999. Ghosheh could return to Jordan in the summer of 2001 on the condition that he stopped his political connections with Hamas within Jordan. However, his return was not welcomed by the Jordanians, and he had to stay at the airport for two weeks before his entry to the country was allowed.

== Views and work ==
Ghosheh was part of the reformist-activist group within Hamas who supported the practical jihadist activities. He was among the critics of the military activity of the Muslim Brotherhood. He did not support the participation of the Hamas in the 2006 legislative election claiming that it might weaken the resistance among the Hamas cadres. He also added that if Hamas leaders Ahmed Yassin and Abdel Aziz al-Rantisi were alive, Hamas would not take part in the election.

Ghosheh published a book entitled Al-Mi’dhanah al-Hamra’: Sirah Dhatiyah (Arabic: The Red Minaret: Memoirs of Ibrahim Ghusheh) in 2008. It was the first autobiography of a Hamas leader who was residing abroad. The book was translated into English in 2013.

Ghosheh declared in his memoirs that his affiliation with the Muslim Brotherhood movement began while he was attending the seventh grade in Jerusalem. He also stated in the book that there was no difference of opinion between the Muslim Brotherhood and Fatah members in the late 1950s and in the early 1960s and that the magazine of Fatah, Falastinuna, was financially supported by the exiled members of the Muslim Brotherhood in Kuwait.

== Death ==
Ghosheh died in Amman on 26 August 2021 at age 84. Funeral prayers for him were held at the University of Jordan Mosque, Amman, and he was buried in the Amman's Shafa Badran cemetery. Hamas leaders, including Ismail Haniyeh and Khaled Mashal, attended his funeral ceremony with the permission of the Jordanian King Abdullah.
