= Azzam Shawwa =

Palestinian economist

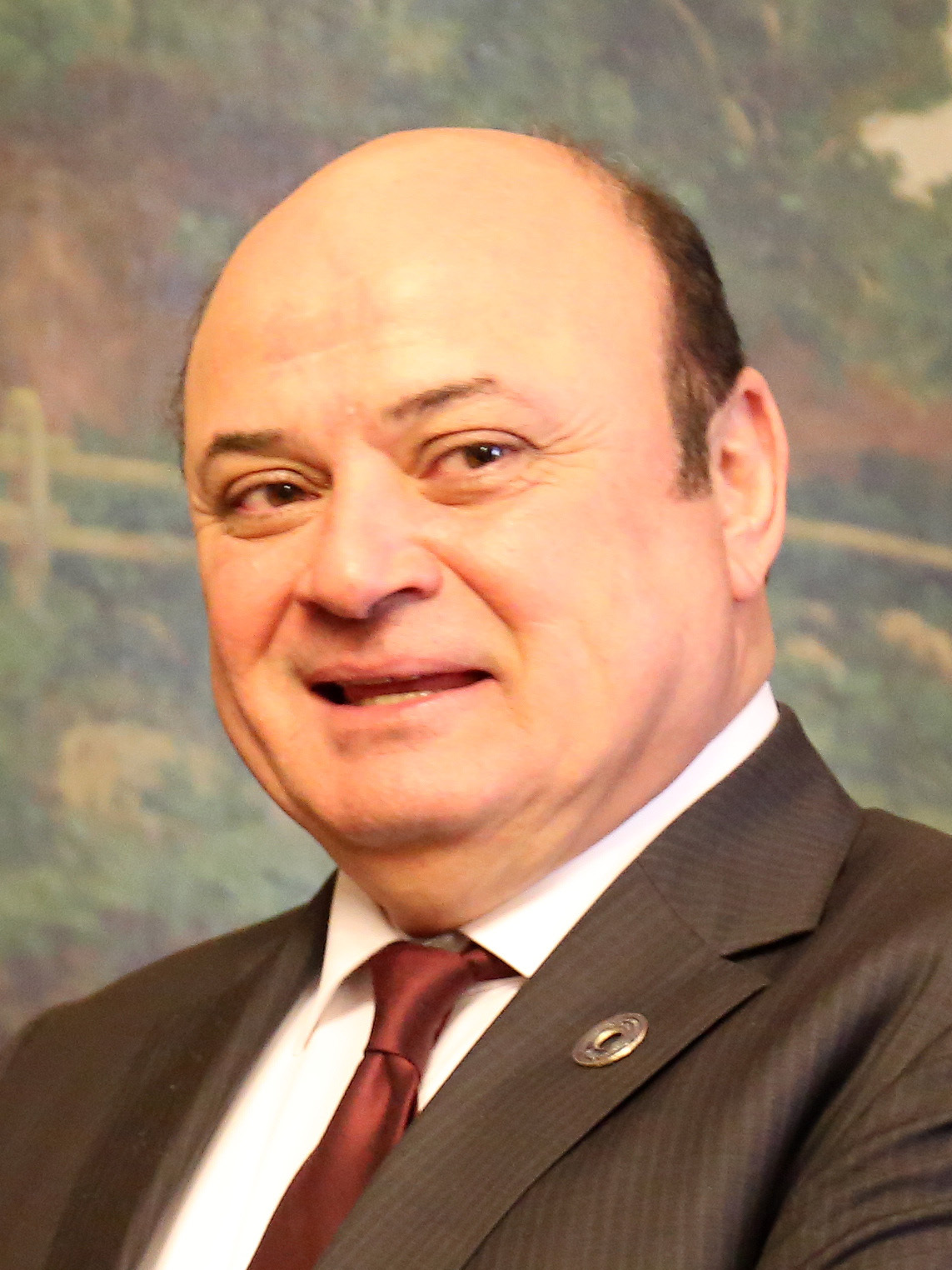

Governor of the Palestine Monetary Authority
- In office November 2015 – January 2021
- Preceded by: Jihad Al Wazir
- Succeeded by: Feras Milhem

Azzam Shawwa is a Palestinian economist who served as the governor of the Palestine Monetary Authority (PMA) from November 2015 to January 2021.
