= Fouad Bseiso =

Palestinian economist

Governor of the Palestine Monetary Authority
- In office December 1994 – November 2001
- Preceded by: Position established
- Succeeded by: Amin Haddad

Fouad Hamdi Shaban Bseiso is a Palestinian economist who served as the first Governor of the Palestine Monetary Authority (PMA) from December 1994 to November 2001.
