= Jihad al-Wazir =

Palestinian economist (born 1963)

- جهاد الوزير

Governor of the Palestine Monetary Authority
- In office 2008–2016
- Preceded by: George al-Abed
- Succeeded by: Azzam Shawwa

Assistant director at the International Monetary Fund
- In office 20??–incumbent

Personal details
- Born: Jihad Khalil Ibrahim al-Wazir; July 20, 1963 (age 63) Gaza City, UAR-occupied Gaza Strip
- Parents: Khalil al-Wazir (father); Intissar al-Wazir (mother)
- Education: Marquette University; Milwaukee School of Engineering; Loughborough University
- Occupation: Economist

Jihad Khalil Ibrahim al-Wazir (Arabic: جهاد خليل إبراهيم الوزير; born July 20, 1963) is a Palestinian economist and public servant, who served as the governor of the Palestine Monetary Authority (PMA) from 2008 to 2016, making significant contributions to the development of the Palestinian banking system and playing a critical role in establishing the Palestine Deposit Insurance Corporation (PDIC). He is currently the assistant director of the Monetary and Capital Markets Department, International Monetary Fund.

Al-Wazir was born in Gaza City to Fatah members Khalil and Intissar al-Wazir. He earned his bachelor's degree in electrical engineering from Marquette University in Wisconsin in 1987, his master's degree in engineering management from the Milwaukee School of Engineering in 1990, and his Ph.D. in business administration from Loughborough University in the UK in 2001.
