= Palestine Monetary Authority =

Central Bank of Palestine

Palestine Monetary Authority سلطة النقد الفلسطينية (Arabic)

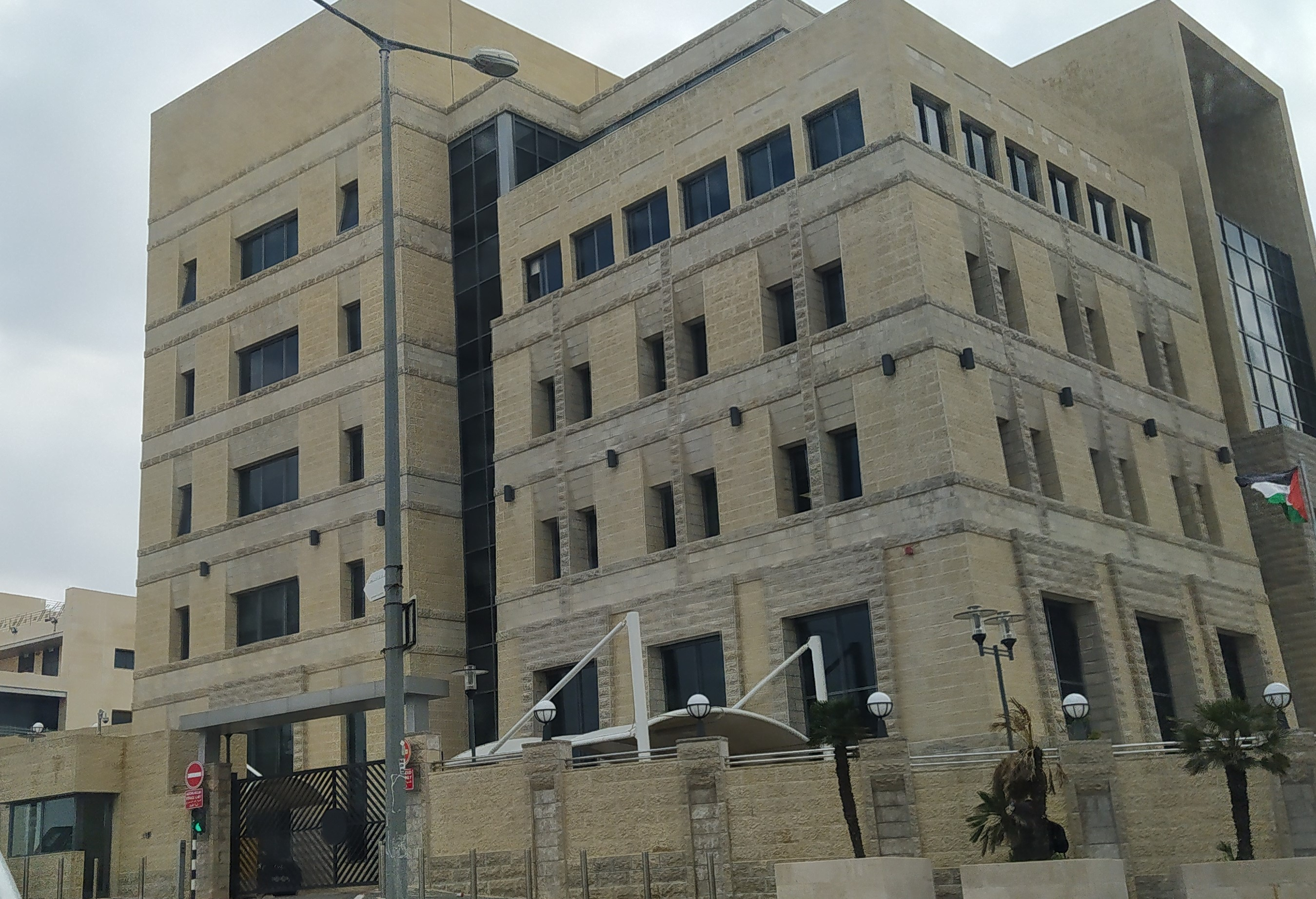
- Central bank of: Palestine
- Headquarters: Ramallah, Palestine
- Established: 1 December 1994
- Ownership: 100% state ownership
- Governor and Chairman: H.E. Yahya Shunnar
- Currency: None
- Website: www.pma.ps

The Palestine Monetary Authority (PMA; Arabic: سلطة النقد الفلسطينية, romanized: Sulṭat al-naqd al-Filasṭīnīyah) is the emerging central bank of Palestine. The PMA, located in Ramallah, was established in 1994 following the signing of the Protocol on Economic Relations (Paris Protocol) between the Palestinians and Israel. It is an independent public institution responsible for the formulation and implementation of monetary and banking policies, to safeguard the banking sector and to ensure the growth of the national economy in a balanced manner.

PMA supervises the 13 Palestinian and foreign banks operating in the West Bank and Gaza Strip. It is not responsible for the issue of a Palestinian currency, as the Protocol on Economic Relations prohibits it from doing so. PMA operates under the authority of PMA Law Number 2 of 1997, an act of the Palestine Legislative Council, and the Banking Law Number 9 of 2010. The logo of the PMA pays homage to the Palestinian pound, minted and circulated under the British Mandate. The logo contains the name of the PMA in English and Arabic, written on the historic 5 mils coin.

== Objectives ==
PMA aims to maintain monetary and financial stability and to promote sustainable economic growth through:

- effective and transparent regulation and supervision of banks, specialized lending institutions and money changers operating in Palestine.
- overseeing the implementation and operation of modern, efficient payment systems.
- development and execution of monetary policy designed to achieve price stability.

PMA is active in promoting financial inclusion policy and is a member of the Alliance for Financial Inclusion.

== Governors ==
The governors of the PMA have been:

- Fouad Bseiso, December 1994 – November 2001
- Amin Haddad, December 2001 – February 2005
- George al-Abed, February 2005 – November 2007
- Jihad al-Wazir, January 2008 – November 2015
- Azzam Shawwa, November 2015 – January 2021
- Feras Milhem, January 2021 – January 2025
- Yahya Shannar, January 2025 – present

== See also ==
- Economy of Palestine
- List of central banks
- Islamic banking and finance
- Islamic socialism
- Islamic economics
