= Khalil al-Wazir =

Palestinian military leader, founder of Fatah (1935–1988)

- خليل الوزير
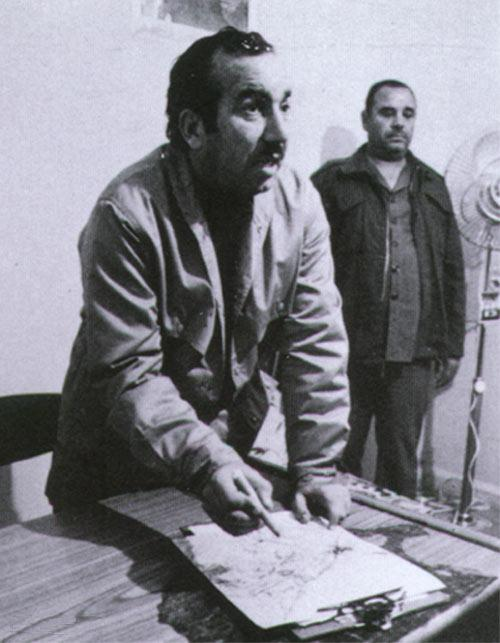
- Khalil al-Wazir strategizing in 1970
- Born: Khalil Ibrahim al-Wazir; 10 October 1935; Ramla, Mandatory Palestine
- Died: 16 April 1988 (aged 52); Tunis, Tunisia
- Burial place: Yarmouk Camp, Damascus, Syria
- Education: Alexandria University
- Spouse: Intissar al-Wazir (m. 1962)
- Children: 5, including Jihad
- Military career
- Allegiance: Fatah/Palestine Liberation Organization
- Branch: Al-Assifa
- Rank: Commander
- Nickname: Abu Jihad
- Conflicts: Battle of Karameh; Jordanian Civil War; 1982 Lebanon War; Siege of Beirut; First Intifada

Khalil Ibrahim al-Wazir (Arabic: خليل إبراهيم الوزير; (Note: Standardized Arabic transliteration: Khalīl Ibrāhīm al-Wazīr / Ḫalīl ʾIbrāhīm al-Wazīr / ḵalīl ibrāhīm al-wazīr.) 10 October 1935 – 16 April 1988), also known by his kunya Abu Jihad (أبو جهاد), (Note: Standardized Arabic transliteration: Abū Jihād.) was a Palestinian leader and co-founder of the nationalist party Fatah. As a top aide of Palestine Liberation Organization (PLO) Chairman Yasser Arafat, al-Wazir had considerable influence in Fatah's military activities, eventually becoming the commander of Fatah's armed wing al-Assifa.

Al-Wazir became a refugee when his family was expelled from Ramla during the 1948 Arab–Israeli War, and began leading a minor fedayeen force in the Gaza Strip. In the early 1960s he established connections for Fatah with Communist regimes and prominent third-world leaders. He opened Fatah's first bureau in Algeria. He played an important role in the 1970–71 Black September clashes in Jordan, by supplying besieged Palestinian fighters with weapons and aid. Following the PLO's defeat by the Jordanian Army, al-Wazir joined the PLO in Lebanon.

Prior to and during Israel's 1982 invasion of Lebanon, al-Wazir planned numerous attacks inside Israel against both civilian and military targets. He prepared Beirut's defense against incoming Israeli forces. Nonetheless, the Israeli military prevailed and al-Wazir was exiled from Lebanon with the rest of the Fatah leadership. He settled in Amman for a two-year period and was then exiled to Tunis in 1986. From his base there, he started to organize youth committees in the Palestinian territories; these eventually formed a major component of the Palestinian forces in the First Intifada. However, he did not live to command the uprising. On 16 April 1988, he was assassinated at his home in Tunis by Israeli commandos.

== Early life ==
Khalil al-Wazir was born in 1935 to Sunni Muslim parents in the city of Ramla, Palestine, then under British Mandatory rule. His father, Ibrahim al-Wazir, worked as a grocer in the city. Al-Wazir and his family were expelled in July 1948, along with another 50,000–70,000 Palestinians from Lydda and Ramla, following Israel's capture of the area during the 1948 Arab-Israeli War. They settled in the Bureij refugee camp in the Gaza Strip, where al-Wazir attended a secondary school run by UNRWA. While in high school, he began organizing a small group of fedayeen to harass Israelis at military posts near the Gaza Strip and the Sinai Peninsula.

In 1954 he came into contact with Yasser Arafat in Gaza; al-Wazir would become Arafat's right-hand man later in his life. During his time in Gaza, al-Wazir became a member of the Egyptian Muslim Brotherhood, and was briefly imprisoned for his membership with the organization, as it was prohibited in Egypt. In 1956, a few months after his release from prison, he received military training in Cairo, Egypt. He also studied architectural engineering at the University of Alexandria, but he did not graduate. Al-Wazir was detained once again in 1957 for leading raids against Israel and was exiled to Saudi Arabia, finding work as a schoolteacher. He continued to teach after moving to Kuwait in 1959.

== Formation of Fatah ==
Al-Wazir used his time in Kuwait to further his ties with Arafat and other fellow Palestinian exiles he had met in Egypt. He and his comrades founded Fatah, a Palestinian nationalist guerrilla and political organization, sometime between 1959 and 1960. He moved to Beirut after being put in charge of editing the newly formed organization's monthly magazine Falastinuna, Nida' Al Hayat ("Our Palestine, the Call to Life"), as he was "the only one with a flair for writing." The magazine was established by Arafat and Al Wazir in November 1959.

Al Wazir settled in Algeria in 1962, after a delegation of Fatah leaders, including Arafat and Farouk Kaddoumi, were invited there by Algerian President Ahmed Ben Bella. Al-Wazir remained there, opened a Fatah office and military training camp in Algiers and was included in an Algerian-Fatah delegation to Beijing in 1964. During his visit, he presented Fatah's ideas to various leaders of the People's Republic of China, including premier Zhou Enlai, and thus inaugurated Fatah's good relationship with China. He also toured other East Asian countries, establishing relations with North Korea and the Viet Cong. Al-Wazir supposedly "charmed Che Guevara" during Guevara's speech in Algiers. With his guerrilla credentials and his contacts with arms-supplying nations, he was assigned the role of recruiting and training fighters, thus establishing Fatah's armed wing al-Assifa (the Storm). While in Algiers, he recruited Abu Ali Iyad who became his deputy and one of the high-ranking commanders of al-Assifa in Syria and Jordan.

=== Syria and post-Six-Day War ===
Al-Wazir and the Fatah leadership settled in Damascus, Syria in 1965, in order take advantage of the large number of Palestine Liberation Army (PLA) members there. On 9 May 1966, he and Arafat were detained by Syrian police loyal to air marshal Hafez al-Assad after an incident where a pro-Syrian Palestinian leader, Yusuf Orabi was thrown out of the window of a three-story building and killed. Al-Wazir and Arafat were either considering uniting Fatah with Orabi's faction—the Revolutionary Front for the Liberation of Palestine—or winning Orabi's support against Arafat's rivals within the Fatah leadership. An argument occurred, eventually leading to Orabi's murder; however, al-Wazir and Arafat had already left the scene shortly before the incident. According to Aburish, Orabi and Assad were "close friends" and Assad appointed a panel to investigate what happened. The panel found both Arafat and al-Wazir guilty, but Salah Jadid, then deputy secretary-general of the president of Syria, pardoned them.

After the defeat of a coalition of Arab states in the 1967 Six-Day War, major Palestinian guerrilla organizations that participated in the war or were sponsored by any of the involved Arab states, such as the Arab Nationalist Movement led by George Habash and the Palestine Liberation Army of Ahmad Shukeiri, lost considerable influence among the Palestinian population. This made Fatah the dominant faction of the Palestine Liberation Organization (PLO). They gained 33 of 105 seats in the Palestinian National Council (PNC) (the most seats allocated to any guerrilla group), thus strengthening al-Wazir's position. During the Battle of Karameh, in March 1968, he and Salah Khalaf held important command positions among Fatah fighters against the Israel Defense Forces (IDF), which developed his credentials as a military strategist. This eventually led to him taking command of al-Assifa, holding major positions in the PNC, and the Supreme Military Council of the PLO. He was also put in charge of guerrilla warfare operations in both the occupied Palestinian territories and Israel proper.

== Black September and the Lebanon War ==
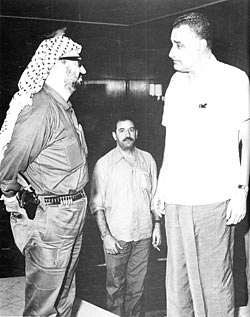
Yasser Arafat and Abu Jihad meet Gamal Abdel Nasser upon arrival in Cairo to attend first emergency Arab League summit, 1970

During the Black September clashes in Jordan, al-Wazir supplied the encircled Palestinian forces in Jerash and Ajlun with arms and aid, but the conflict was decided in Jordan's favor. After Arafat and thousands of Fatah fighters retreated to Lebanon, al-Wazir negotiated an agreement between King Hussein and the PLO's leading organizer, calling for better Palestinian conduct in Jordan. Then, along with the other PLO leaders, he relocated to Beirut.

Al-Wazir did not play a major role in the Lebanese Civil War; he confined himself primarily to strengthening the Lebanese National Movement, the PLO's main ally in the conflict. During the fall of the Tel al-Zaatar camp to the Lebanese Front, al-Wazir blamed himself for not organizing a rescue effort.

During his time in Lebanon, al-Wazir was responsible for coordinating high-profile operations. He allegedly planned the Savoy Hotel attack in 1975, in which eight Fatah militants raided and took civilian hostages in the Savoy hotel in Tel Aviv, killing eight of them, as well as three Israeli soldiers. The Coastal Road massacre, in March 1978, was also planned by al-Wazir. In this attack, six Fatah members hijacked a bus and killed 35 Israeli civilians. Other attacks he was implicated in include the 1974 Nahariya attack, the Zion Square refrigerator bombing, and the 1980 Hebron attack.

When Israel besieged Beirut in 1982, al-Wazir, disagreed with the PLO's leftist members and Salah Khalaf; he proposed that the PLO pull out of Beirut. Nevertheless, al-Wazir and his aide Abu al-Walid planned Beirut's defense and helped direct PLO forces against the IDF. PLO forces were eventually defeated and then expelled from Lebanon, with most of the leadership relocating to Tunis, although al-Wazir and 264 other PLO members were received by King Hussein of Jordan.

== Establishing a movement in the West Bank and Gaza Strip ==
Dissatisfied at the decisive defeat of Palestinian forces in Lebanon during the 1982 Lebanon War, al-Wazir concentrated on establishing a solid Fatah base in the Israeli-occupied West Bank and Gaza Strip. In 1982, he began to sponsor youth committees in the territories. These organizations would grow and initiate the First Intifada in December 1987 (the word Intifada in Arabic, literally translated as "shaking off", is generally used to describe an uprising or revolt).

The Intifada began as an uprising of Palestinian youth against the Israeli occupation of the West Bank and Gaza Strip. On 7 June 1986, about a year before the Intifada started, al-Wazir was deported from Amman to Baghdad, eventually moving to Tunisia days after King Hussein declared that efforts in establishing a joint strategy for the Israeli–Palestinian conflict between Jordan and the PLO were over.

The first stage of the Intifada took place upon escalation of two unrelated incidents in the Gaza Strip. The first was a traffic incident at the Erez checkpoint, where an Israeli military vehicle hit a group of Palestinian laborers, killing four of them. The funerals, attended by 10,000 people from the camp that evening, quickly led to a large demonstration. Rumours swept the camp that the incident was an act of intentional retaliation for the second event - stabbing to death of an Israeli businessman, killed while shopping in Gaza two days earlier. Following the throwing of a petrol bomb at a passing patrol car in the Gaza Strip on the following day, Israeli forces, firing with live ammunition and tear gas canisters into angry crowds, shot one young Palestinian dead and wounded 16 others.

However, within weeks, following persistent requests by al-Wazir, the PLO attempted to direct the uprising, which lasted until 1991, or 1993, according to various authorities. Al-Wazir had been assigned by Arafat the responsibility of the territories within the PLO command. According to author Said Aburish, he had "impressive knowledge of local conditions" in the Israeli-occupied territories, apparently knowing "every village, school, and large family in Gaza and the West Bank". He provided the uprising with financial backing and logistical support, thus becoming its "brain in exile". Al-Wazir activated every cell he had set up in the territories since the late 1970s in an effort to militarily back the stone-throwers who formed the backbone of the Palestinian revolt. He also used the opportunity to reform the PLO. According to author Yezid Sayigh, al-Wazir believed that the Intifada should not have been sacrificed to Arafat solely for use as a diplomatic or political tool.

== Assassination ==
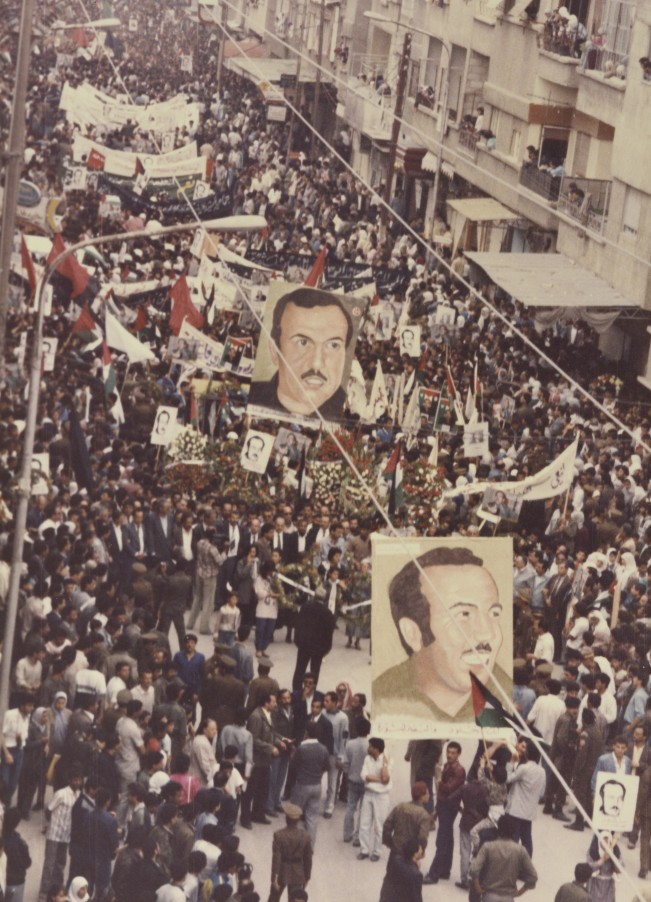
Funeral demonstrations in Damascus

Al-Wazir was assassinated in an Israeli commando raid in his home in Tunis on the early morning of 16 April 1988 at the age of 52.

The Israeli government had decided to assassinate him after the outbreak of the First Intifada. Israel accused al-Wazir of escalating the violence of the Intifada, which was ongoing at the time of his assassination. The Mothers' Bus attack, a March 1988 hijacking of an Israeli bus believed to have been organized by Al-Wazir in which three Israeli civilians were killed, was a major catalyst in pushing the Israeli government to approve the assassination.

In his book Rise and Kill First, which was based on interviews with Israeli military and intelligence personnel, Israeli journalist Ronen Bergman provided a detailed account of the assassination. The Israeli security cabinet under Prime Minister Yitzhak Shamir met on 14 March 1988 to discuss assassinating him. Although Shamir could have given the order on his own, he was aware of the potential ramifications of assassinating such a high-profile figure and did not want to take sole responsibility. The security cabinet approved the assassination by a vote of 6 to 4. The Washington Post reported on 21 April that the Israeli cabinet approved al-Wazir's assassination on 13 April.

The assassination, codenamed Operation Introductory Lesson, had been planned by the Mossad for over a year. Mossad agents had scouted routes to his home from the nearby beach and mapped his neighborhood. The Mossad and Israeli military intelligence had tracked his movements and tapped his telephone lines. Under the plan, a naval flotilla backed by air cover would land commandos on the Tunisian coast, where they would be driven to his home by waiting Mossad agents and kill him. Ehud Barak, the IDF Deputy Chief of Staff, was placed in overall command of the operation.

On 14 April, six Mossad operatives arrived in Tunis on flights from Europe. Three of them rented two Volkswagen Transporters and a Peugeot 305, which would be used to ferry the raiding force from the beach to his home. Another three were deployed as lookouts, positioning themselves behind a clump of trees to monitor his home and ensure that he was there. Under the plan, the drivers would evacuate by sea with the commandos while the lookouts would leave Tunisia on commercial flights after the operation.

At the same time, an Israeli Navy flotilla sailed towards Tunisia, halting 25 miles off the Tunisian coast on 15 April. It consisted of five missile boats carrying 33 Sayeret Matkal and Shayetet 13 commandos along with a mobile hospital and communications equipment, a larger vessel disguised as a cargo ship and fitted out as a helicopter carrier with a reserve Sayeret Matkal unit ready to intervene if the operation went awry, and the Gal-class submarine INS Gal providing an underwater escort. The Israeli Air Force provided cover overhead with a Boeing 707 communications aircraft to serve as a communications relay, monitor Tunisian communications, and stand by to jam Tunisian radar and air control if needed, and F-15 fighter jets patrolling off the Tunisian coast ready to provide backup.

At dusk on 15 April, after the INS Gal surveyed the shore and reported that the beach was deserted, the commando force headed out towards the shore in rubber dinghies. As they approached the beach, seven Shayetet 13 commandos led by Yoav Gallant dived into the water and swam onto the beach, where they created a perimeter, established radio contact with the waiting Mossad drivers and told them to approach the shore, and cleared the rest of the commandos to land. The Sayeret Matkal commandos linked up with the Mossad drivers and changed into dry clothes they carried in waterproof bags; they would infiltrate Al-Wazir's neighborhood dressed as civilians, including some disguised as women. The Shayetet 13 commandos remained on the beach to keep it secure for the evacuation. Meanwhile, Al-Wazir arrived at home just after midnight with two bodyguards, and was observed by the Mossad lookouts watching his house. He then took a phone call from an aide who informed him he had a seat reserved on a flight to Baghdad at a little after 3:00 am. Israeli intelligence had been monitoring the call. While it had been originally intended to enter his home at 1:30 am, it was deemed likely that he would be on his way to the airport by then, and it was decided to execute the mission immediately.

The two Volkswagen Transporters, which carried the commando team, then set out. Two Mossad operatives drove the Peugeot 305 ahead of them to scout the route for the attacking force and ensure they would not run into any unexpected obstacles. The three vehicles stopped a few hundred yards from Al-Wazir's home. As the commandos advanced, a final effort was made to positively confirm his presence, as the report by the Mossad lookouts was not considered sufficient evidence. A phone call was placed to his home through an exchange in Italy, the means by which he generally communicated with personnel in the Palestinian territories, and a conversation was initiated with him while three Arabic-speaking soldiers from Unit 8200 in the operation's command bunker in Tel Aviv who had extensively studied his voice monitored the conversation. After each of them confirmed that the voice was Al-Wazir's, the command bunker in Tel Aviv then radioed the seaborne command post that the operation could proceed.

After receiving final approval for the operation, the Sayeret Matkal force, led by Major Nahum Lev, then went into action. Lev and another soldier disguised as a woman approached one of his bodyguards who was sitting in a car next to the house, showed him a hotel brochure and asked him how to get there, then shot him as he studied the brochure. A group of commandos then moved forward and opened the door with a hydraulic jack while the rest of the force surrounded the house. Commandos then entered the home. Some went into the basement where they killed the second bodyguard and the family's gardener who was sleeping there. Al-Wazir was found upstairs and killed, with the commandos taking turns firing into his body after he fell. He was shot a total of 52 times. The entire raid, from the killing of the guard in the car in front of his house to the commandos returning to the vehicles to make their getaway, took five minutes.

The raiding force then evacuated to the beach and returned to the missile boats. The local police were distracted by multiple false reports placed by Mossad agents of a convoy of cars racing from Al-Wazir's neighborhood towards downtown Tunis - the opposite direction from the one taken by the raiding force.

According to other accounts, he was shot on the landing of his house by a commando who pursued him upstairs when he ran there after hearing the shots that killed two security guards outside. A different version has it he was working on a memo to leaders of the Intifada, and only had time to fire off one shot from his pistol when the assassination squad burst into his rooms. He was shot at close range, reportedly 70 times, in the presence of his wife Intissar and his son Nidal, above whose bed a commando then fired a burst of automatic fire as a warning. Another account posits that the assassins gained entry to the PLO compound via IDs stolen from kidnapped Lebanese fishermen.

Following his assassination, riots immediately broke out in the Palestinian territories, and at least a dozen Palestinians were shot dead in the worst show of violence since the outbreak of the uprising. He was buried in the Yarmouk refugee camp in Damascus on 21 April; Arafat led the funeral procession.

In 2012, Israel unofficially confirmed that it was responsible for his assassination, after an interview Ronen Bergman conducted with Nahum Lev was cleared for publication – its release had been blocked by military censors for more than a decade. In that interview, Lev gave Bergman a detailed account of the operation.

The United States Department of State condemned his killing as an "act of political assassination". The UN Security Council approved Resolution 611 condemning "the aggression perpetrated against the sovereignty and territorial integrity of Tunisia", without specifically mentioning Israel.

== Personal life ==
Al-Wazir married his cousin Intissar al-Wazir in 1962 and had five children with her. They had three sons, named Jihad, Bassem and Nidal, and two daughters, named Iman and Hanan al-Wazir. Intissar and her children returned to Gaza following the Oslo Accords between Israel and the PLO and in 1996 she became the first female minister in the Palestinian National Authority. Intissar later became head of the Palestinian Authority Martyrs Fund, the organization that provides stipends to the families of Palestinians killed or wounded during confrontations with Israeli authorities. His son Jihad is a former governor of the Palestinian Monetary Authority and currently works for the International Monetary Fund.

After Hamas' takeover of the Gaza Strip in 2007, looters raided al-Wazir's home, reportedly stealing his personal belongings. Intissar al-Wazir said that the looting "occurred in broad daylight and under the watchful eye of Hamas militiamen."

In 2014, the Palestinian Authority named a forest in the West Bank as the Martyr Khalil Al-Wazir Forest.

== See also ==
- List of Fatah members
- Salah al-Zawawi

== Bibliography ==
- Aburish, Said K. (1998). Arafat: From Defender to Dictator. Bloomsbury Publishing. ISBN 978-1-58234-049-4.
- Cobban, Helena (1984). The Palestinian Liberation Organisation: People, Power, and Politics. New York: Cambridge University Press Bloomsbury Publishing. ISBN 0-521-27216-5.
- Morris, Benny (2004). The Birth of the Palestinian Refugee Problem Revisited. Cambridge University Press.
- Sayigh, Yezid (1997). Armed Struggle and the Search for State, the Palestinian National Movement, 1949–1993. London: Oxford University Press. ISBN 0-19-829643-6.
