= Palestinian expulsion from Lydda and Ramle =

1948 expulsion by Israeli forces

Coordinates: 31°56′30″N 34°52′42″E

- Part of the Palestinian expulsions in the 1948 Palestine war, the Nakba, and Operation Dani
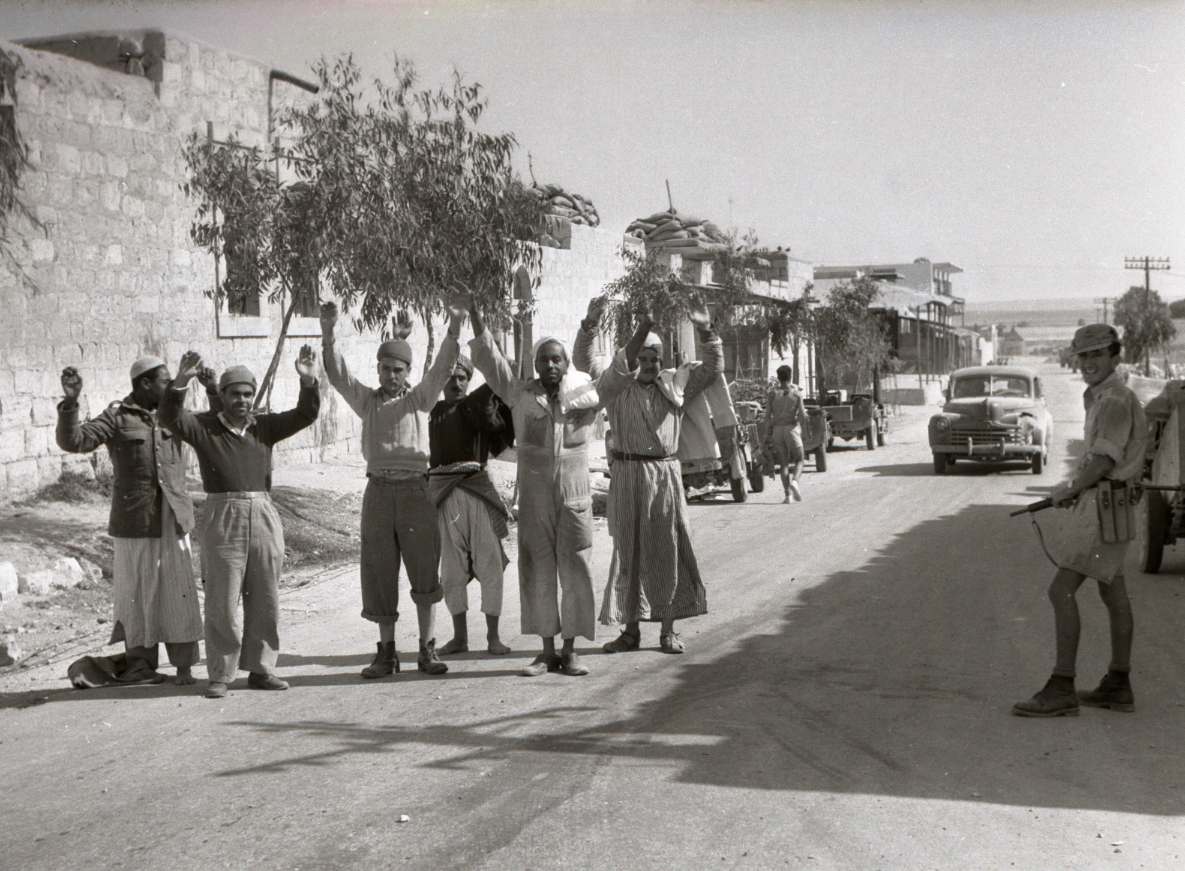
- An Israeli soldier with detained Palestinians in Ramle
- Location: The towns of Lydda and Ramle in Palestine
- Date: July 10–14, 1948
- Attack type: Ethnic cleansing
- Deaths: Unknown. Estimates range from hundreds to 1,000+ (Note: Palumbo 1987; "In all, probably about 1,000 Arab civilians died during and immediately after the expulsion from Lydda-Ramle.") (Note: Nimr al-Khatib estimated 1,700 killed.)
- Victim: Palestinian Arabs
- Perpetrator: Israel Defense Forces
- 50,000–70,000 Palestinians expelled

In July 1948, during the 1948 Palestine war, the Palestinian towns of Lydda (also known as Lod) and Ramle were captured by the Israel Defense Forces and their residents (totalling 50,000–70,000 people) (Note: Slater 2020, "[...] violently expelled 50,000 inhabitants of the Palestinian towns of Lydda and Ramle.") (Note: Pappé 2006, "[...] expelled the populations of the two towns of Lydd and Ramla, altogether 70,000 people") were violently expelled. The expulsions occurred as part of the broader 1948 Palestinian expulsions and the Nakba. Hundreds of Palestinians were killed in multiple mass killings, including the Lydda massacre, and in what is sometimes known as the Lydda death march. The two Arab towns, lying outside the area designated for a Jewish state in the UN Partition Plan of 1947, and inside the area set aside for an Arab state in Palestine, were subsequently incorporated into the new State of Israel and repopulated with Jewish immigrants. After their conquest the towns were given Hebrew names of Lod and Ramla.

The exodus, constituting the biggest expulsion of the war, took place at the end of a truce period, when fighting resumed, prompting Israel to try to improve its control over the Jerusalem road and its coastal route which were under pressure from the Jordanian Arab Legion along with Egyptian and Palestinian forces. From the Israeli perspective, the conquest of the towns, designed, according to Benny Morris, "to induce civilian panic and flight", averted an Arab threat to Tel Aviv, thwarted an Arab Legion advance by clogging the roads with refugees—the Yiftah Brigade was ordered to strip them of "every watch, piece of jewelry, or money, or valuables"—to force the Arab Legion to assume an additional logistical burden with the arrival of masses of indigent refugees that would undermine its military capacities, and helped demoralise nearby Arab cities.

Once the Israelis were in control of the towns, an expulsion order signed by Yitzhak Rabin was issued to the Israel Defense Forces (IDF) stating, "1. The inhabitants of Lydda must be expelled quickly without attention to age....". Ramle's residents were bussed out, while the people of Lydda were forced to walk miles during a summer heat wave to the Arab front lines, where the Arab Legion tried to provide shelter and supplies. A number of the refugees died during the exodus from exhaustion and dehydration, with estimates ranging from a handful to a figure of 500.

== Background ==
=== 1948 Palestine war ===
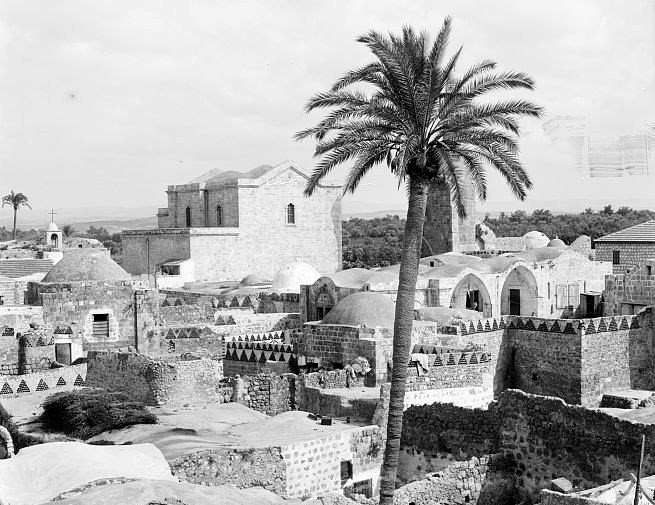
Lydda in 1920 with St. George's Church in the background

After 30 years of intercommunal conflict between Jews and Arabs in Mandatory Palestine, on 29 November 1947, the United Nations voted to partition the territory into a Jewish and an Arab state, with Lydda and Ramle to form part of the latter. After the announcement of the UN Partition Plan civil war broke out between the communities. British authority broke down as the civil war spread, taking care of little more than the evacuation of their own forces, although they maintained an air and sea blockade. After the first 4.5 months of fights, Jewish militias had conquered the main mixed cities of the country, expelling and causing the flight of 300,000-350,000 Palestinians.

The British Mandate expired on 14 May 1948, and the State of Israel declared its independence. Transjordan, Egypt, Syria and Iraq intervened by sending expeditionary forces that entered former Mandatory Palestine and engaged Israeli forces. Six weeks of fighting followed, after which none of the belligerents had won the upper hand. After four weeks of truce, during which Israeli forces reinforced whereas Arab ones suffered under the embargo, the fighting resumed, which is when the attack on Lydda and Ramle took place.

=== Strategic importance of Lydda and Ramle ===
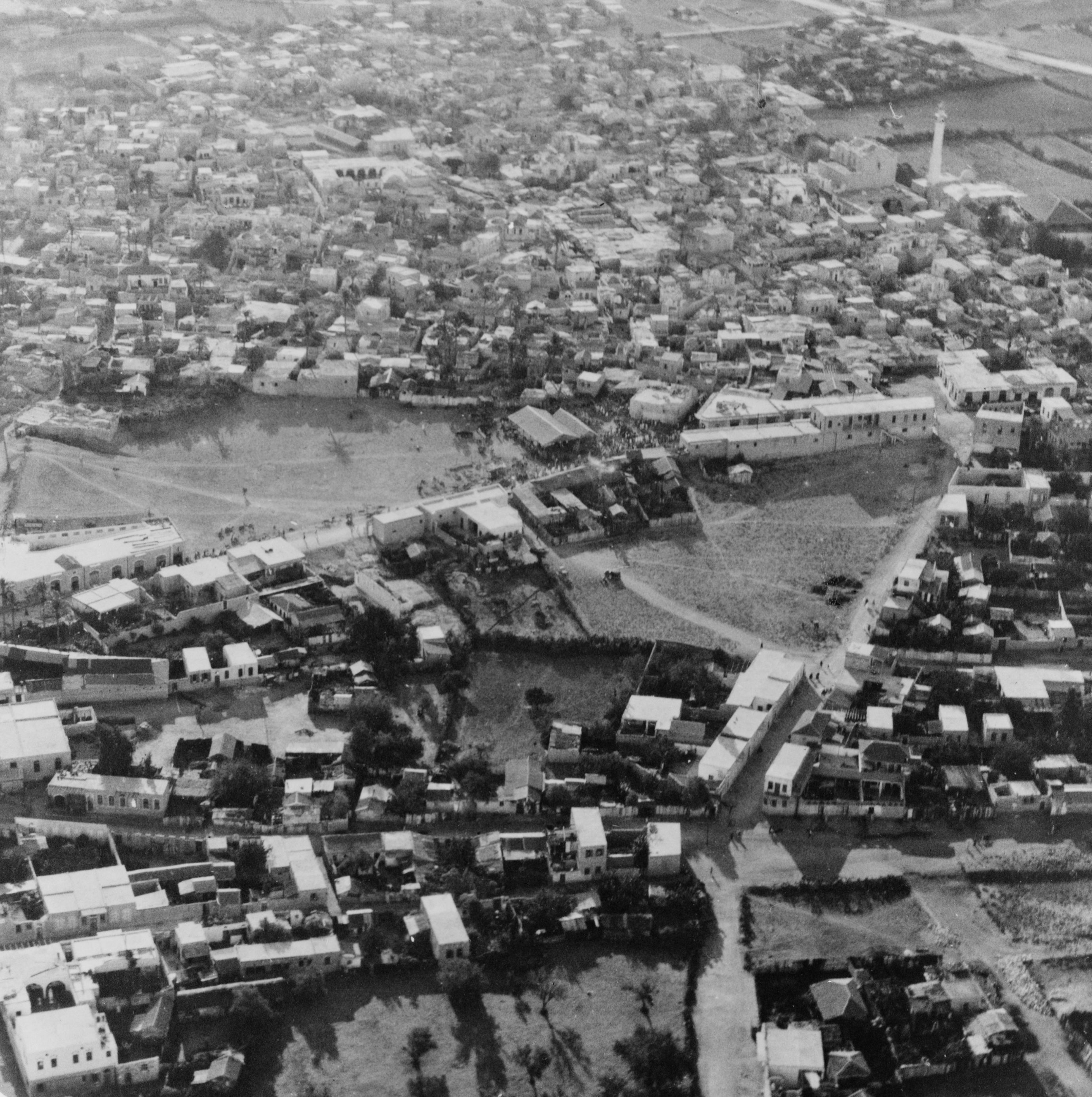
The city of Lydda in 1932

The Palestinian towns of Lydda and Ramle were strategically important because they sat at the intersection of Palestine's main north–south and east–west roads. Palestine's main railway junction and its airport (now Ben Gurion International Airport) were in Lydda, and the main source of Jerusalem's water supply was 15 kilometers away. Jewish and Arab fighters had been attacking each other on roads near the towns since hostilities broke out in December 1947. Israeli geographer Arnon Golan writes that Palestinian Arabs had blocked Jewish transport to Jerusalem at Ramle, causing Jewish transportation to shift to a southern route. Israel had launched several ground or air attacks on Ramle and Latrun in May 1948, and Israel's prime minister, David Ben-Gurion, developed what Benny Morris calls an obsession with the towns; he wrote in his diary that they had to be destroyed, and on 16 June referred to them during an Israeli cabinet meeting as the "two thorns". Lydda's local Arab authority, officially subordinated to the Arab Higher Committee, assumed local civic and military powers. The records of Lydda's military command discuss military training, constructing obstacles and trenches, requisitioning vehicles and assembling armoured cars armed with machine-guns, and attempts at arms procurement. In April 1948, Lydda had become an arms supply center, and provided military training and security coordination for the neighboring villagers.

=== Operation Dani ===
Israel subsequently launched Operation Dani to secure the Tel Aviv-Jerusalem road and neutralise any threat to Tel Aviv from the Jordanian Arab Legion, which was stationed in Ramallah and Latrun, with a number of men in Lydda. On 7 July the IDF appointed Yigal Allon to head the operation, and Yitzhak Rabin, who became Israel's prime minister in 1974, as his operations officer; both had served in the Palmach, an elite fighting force of the pre-Israel Jewish community in Palestine. The operation was carried out between 9 July 1948, the end of the first truce in the Arab-Israeli war, and 18 July, the start of the second truce, a period known in Israeli historiography as the Ten Days Battles. Morris writes that the IDF assembled its largest force ever: the Yiftach Brigade; the Eighth Armoured Brigade's 82nd and 89th Battalions; three battalions of Kiryati and Alexandroni infantry men; an estimated 6,000 men with around 30 artillery pieces.

=== Lydda's defenses ===
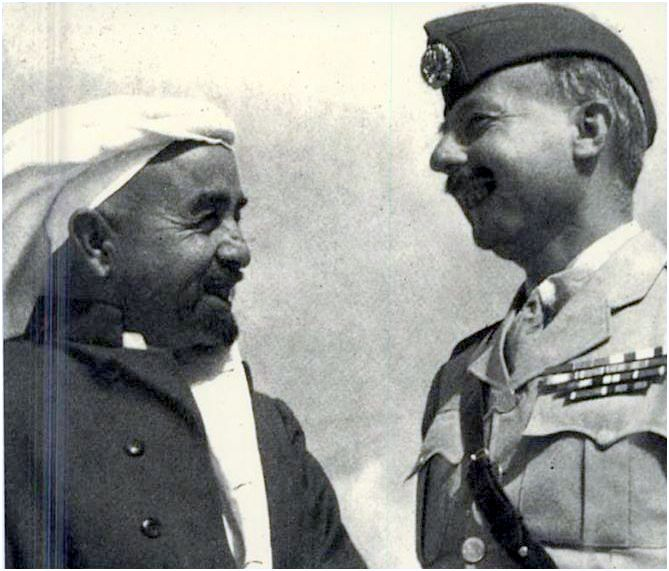
King Abdullah of Jordan (1882–1951) with British officer John Bagot Glubb (1897–1986), the commander of the Tranjordanian Arab Legion

In July 1948 Lydda and Ramle had a joint population of 50,000–70,000 Palestinian Arabs, 20,000 of them refugees from Jaffa and elsewhere. Several Palestinian Arab towns had already fallen to Jewish or Israeli advances since April, but Lydda and Ramle had held out. There are differing views as to how well-defended the towns were. In January 1948, John Bagot Glubb, the commander of the Arab Legion, had toured Palestinian Arab towns, including Lydda and Ramle, urging them to prepare to defend themselves. The Legion had distributed barbed wire and as many weapons as could be spared.

Palestinian historian Walid Khalidi writes that just 125 Legionnaires from the Fifth Infantry Company were in Lydda—the Arab Legion numbered 6,000 in all—and that the rest of the town's defense consisted of civilian residents acting under the command of a retired Arab Legion sergeant. According to Morris, a number of Arab Legion soldiers, including 200–300 Bedouin volunteers, had arrived in Lydda and Ramle in April, and a company-sized force had set itself up in the former Palestine Police Force stations in Lydda and on the Lydda-Ramle road, with armoured cars and other weapons. He writes that there were 150 Legionnaires in the town in June, though the Israelis believed there were up to 1,500. An Arab Legion officer was appointed military governor of both towns, signaling the desire of Abdullah I of Jordan to stake a claim in the parts of Palestine allotted by the UN to a Palestinian Arab state, but Glubb advised him that the Legion was overstretched and could not hold the towns. As a result, Abdullah ordered the Legion to assume a defensive position only, and most of the Legionnaires in Lydda withdrew during the night of 11–12 July.

== Fall of the cities ==
=== Israeli bombing and surrender of Ramle ===
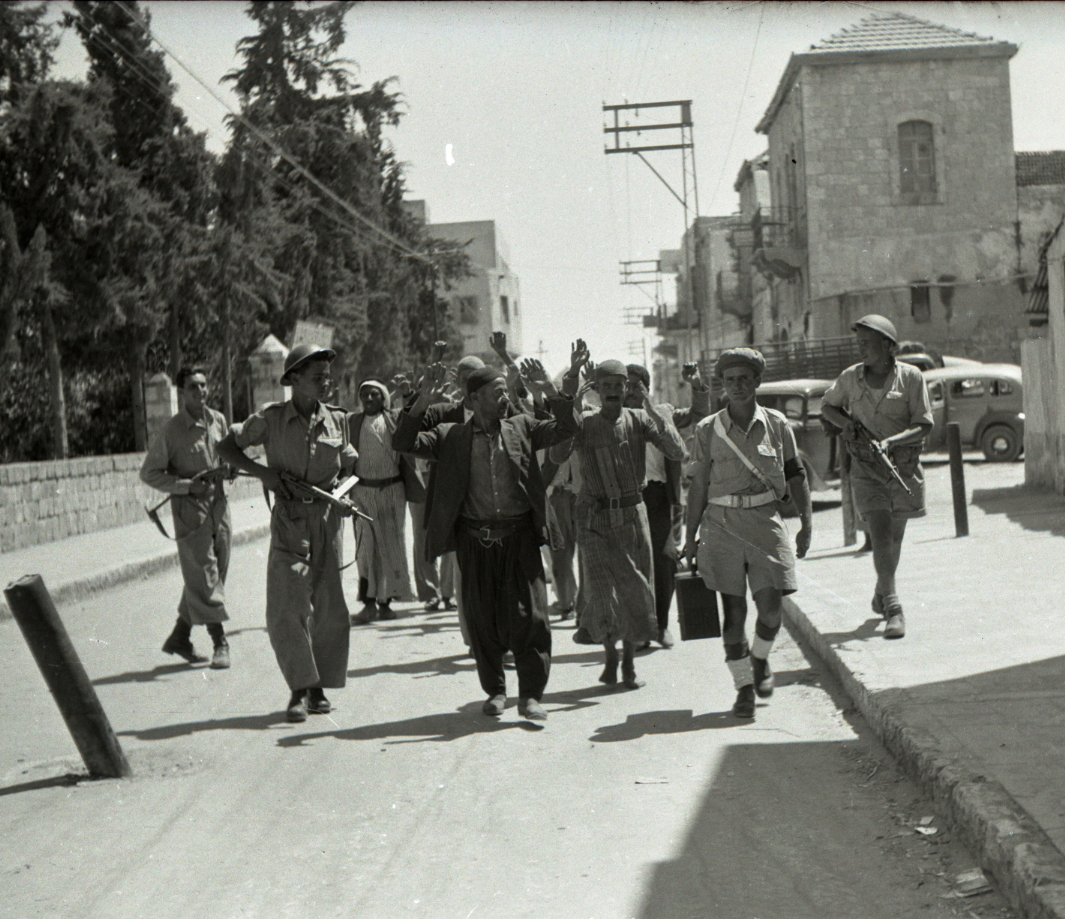
Palestinian men and armed Israeli soldiers. Ramle, 10 July 1948

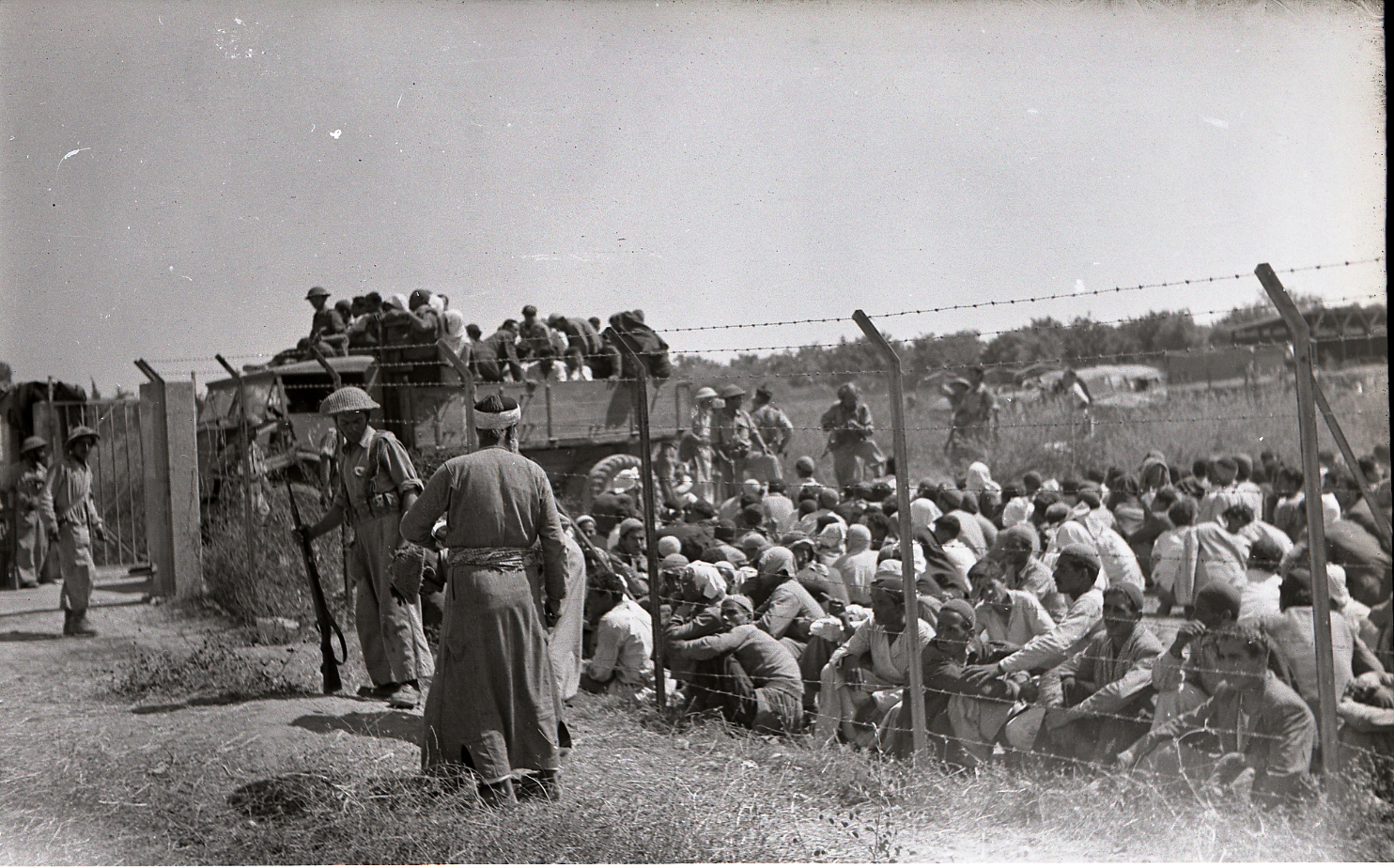
Palestinian men behind barbed wire fencing before their expulsion. Ramle, 10 July 1948

The Israeli air force began bombing the towns on the night of 9–10 July, intending to induce civilian flight, and it seemed to work in Ramle: at 11:30 hours on 10 July, Operation Dani headquarters (Dani HQ) told the IDF that there was a "general and serious flight from Ramla." That afternoon, Dani HQ told one of its brigades to facilitate the flight from Ramle of women, children, and the elderly, but to detain men of military age. On the same day, the IDF took control of Lydda airport. The Israeli air force dropped leaflets over both towns on 11 July telling residents to surrender. Ramle's community leaders, along with three prominent Arab family representatives, agreed to surrender, after which the Israelis mortared the city and imposed a curfew. The New York Times reported at the time that the capture of the city was seen as the high point of Israel's brief existence.

Khalil Wazir, who later joined the PLO and became known as Abu Jihad, was evicted from the town with his family, who owned a grocer's store there, when he was 12 years old. He said he saw bodies scattered in the streets and between the houses, including the bodies of women and children.

=== Moshe Dayan raid on Lydda ===
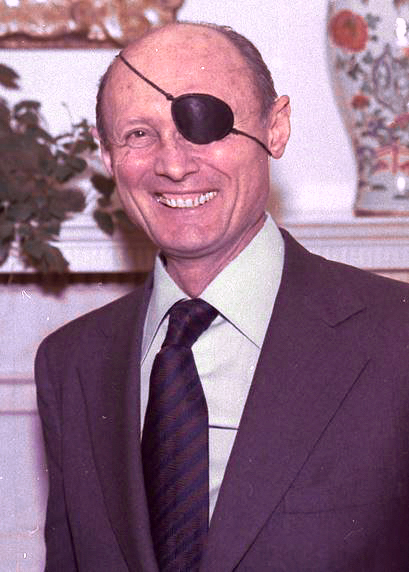
Moshe Dayan (1915–1981) led a raid on Lydda "blasting at everything that moved."

During the afternoon of 11 July, Israel's 89th (armoured) Battalion, led by Lt. Col. Moshe Dayan, moved into Lydda. Israeli historian Anita Shapira writes that the raid was carried out on Dayan's initiative without coordinating it with his commander. Using a column of jeeps led by a Marmon-Herrington Armoured Car with a cannon—taken from the Arab Legion the day before—he launched the attack in daylight, driving through the town from east to west machine-gunning anything that moved, according to Morris, (Note: Morris 2004. "Civilian morale (and the military will to resist) was further dented by the raid on late afternoon 11 July of the 89th Battalion (commanded by Lt. Colonel Moshe Dayan) on Lydda and along the Lydda–Ramle road. Two of the battalion’s companies, mounted on an armoured car, jeeps, scout cars and half-tracks, drove through Lydda from east to west spraying machine-gun fire at anything that moved, and then proceeded southwards, shooting up militia outposts along the Lydda–Ramle road, reaching Ramle’s train station on the town’s north-eastern edge, before returning to their starting point at Ben Shemen. The battalion suffered six dead and 21 wounded – but killed and wounded dozens of Arabs (perhaps as many as 200).") then along the Lydda-Ramle road firing at militia posts until they reached the train station in Ramle. Kenneth Bilby, a correspondent for the New York Herald Tribune, was in the city at the time. He wrote: "[The Israeli jeep column] raced into Lydda with rifles, Stens, and sub-machine guns blazing. It coursed through the main streets, blasting at everything that moved ... the corpses of Arab men, women, and even children were strewn about the streets in the wake of this ruthlessly brilliant charge."

The raid lasted 47 minutes, leaving an unknown number of dead, "perhaps as many as 200" according to Benny Morris. Ari Shavit writes that "In forty-seven minutes of blitz, more than a hundred Arab civilians are shot dead—women, children, old people." According to Dayan's 89th Battalion, 100–150 Palestinians were killed. The Israeli side lost 6 dead and 21 wounded.

According to historians Kadish and Sela, the high casualty rate was caused by confusion over who Dayan's troops were. The IDF were wearing keffiyehs and were led by an armoured car seized from the Arab Legion. Residents may have believed the Arab Legion had arrived, only to encounter Dayan's forces shooting at everything as they ran from their homes.

=== Surrender and occupation of Lydda ===
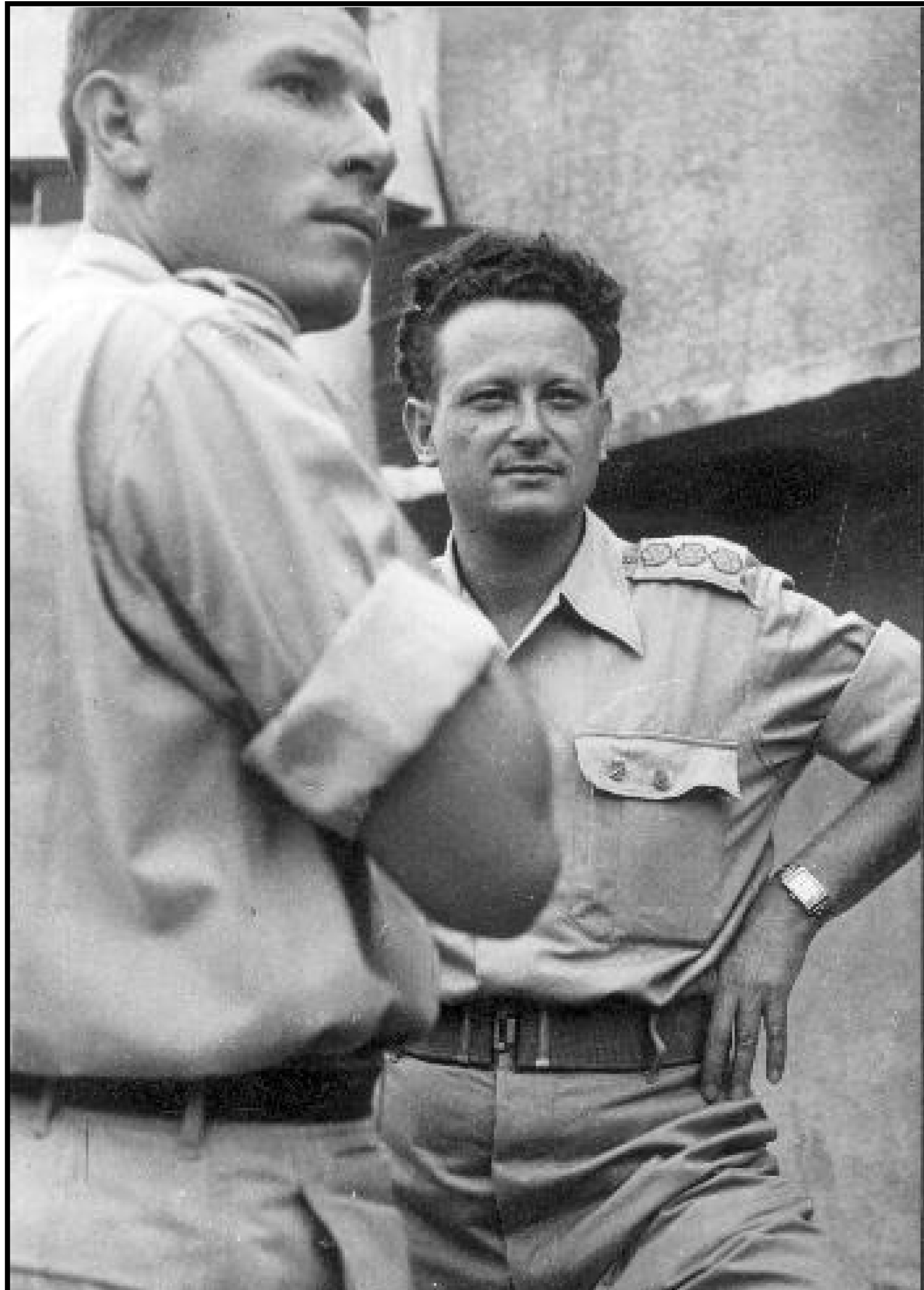
Moshe Kelman (left) with Yigal Allon, 1948

Although no formal surrender was announced in Lydda, people gathered in the streets waving white flags. On the evening of 11 July, 300–400 Israeli soldiers entered the town. Not long afterwards, the Arab Legion forces on the Lydda–Ramle road withdrew, though a small number of Legionnaires remained in the Lydda police station. More Israeli troops arrived at dawn on 12 July. According to a contemporaneous IDF account: "Groups of old and young, women and children streamed down the streets in a great display of submissiveness, bearing white flags, and entered of their own free will the detention compounds we arranged in the mosque and church—Muslims and Christians separately." The buildings soon filled up, and women and children were released, leaving several thousand men inside, including 4,000 in one of the mosque compounds.

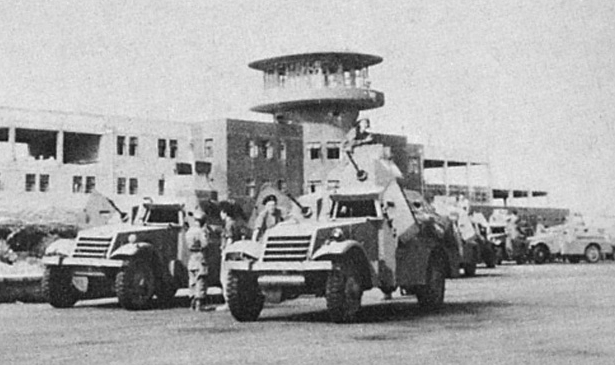
Israeli forces at the Lydda Airport after the fall of the city

The town dignitaries were assembled and after discussion, decided to surrender. Lydda's inhabitants were instructed to leave their weapons on the doorsteps to be collected by soldiers but did not do so. A curfew for that evening was announced over loudspeakers. A delegation of town dignitaries, including Lydda's mayor, left for the police station to prevail upon the Legionnaires there to also surrender. They refused and fired upon the party, killing the mayor and wounding several others. Despite this, the Israeli 3rd Battalion decided to accept the town's surrender. Israeli historian Yoav Gelber writes that the Legionnaires still in the police station were panicking, and had been sending frantic messages to their HQ in Ramallah: "Have you no God in your hearts? Don't you feel any compassion? Hasten aid!" They were about to surrender, but were told by their HQ to wait to be rescued.

== Lydda massacre ==
On 12 July, at 11:30 hours, two or three Arab Legion armoured cars entered the city, led by Lt. Hamadallah al-Abdullah from the Jordanian 1st Brigade. The Arab Legion armoured cars and the occupying Israeli soldiers engaged in a firefight which created the impression that the Jordanians had staged a counterattack, leading those in the city still armed to start firing at the Israelis too. Historian Benny Morris writes that "probably no more than several dozen townspeople participated in the (brief) firefight." The Israeli response was disproportionate, (Note: Saleh Abdel Jawad, 2007, Zionist Massacres: the Creation of the Palestinian Refugee Problem in the 1948 War. "After the capitulation of the city, three Jordanian troop carriers entered the city for a very short time. They gave the wrong impression that Jordanian forces had returned. Some of the Palestinian militia, who were still armed, opened fire on Israeli forces thinking that the Jordanians had recaptured the city. Israeli reprisals were immediate and disproportionate.") with Moshe Kelman ordering his troops to shoot at any clear target, including at anyone seen on the streets. Many civilians were killed by Israeli forces in what became one of the bloodiest massacres of the war. Israeli soldiers threw grenades into houses and residents ran out of their homes in panic and were shot. (Note: Morris 2008 "At around noon, 12 July, a squadron of Legion armored cars drove into Lydda, either to reconnoiter or to look for a stranded officer. They came up against surprised Third Battalion troopers, who thought the town had been pacified. A firefight ensued, and locals joined in, sniping from windows and rooftops. The jittery Palmahniks responded by firing at any thing that moved, throwing grenades into houses and massacring detainees in a mosque compound; altogether, "about 250" townspeople died, and many were injured, according to IDF records.")

Mordechai Maklef, an operations officer on the Northern Front (and later IDF chief of staff), stated that in some operations “the potential enemy” was eliminated, meaning civilians. He cited cases including Lod and Ramla, adding that the intention was expulsion and implying that mass displacement could not be carried out without such acts of terror.

=== Killings in the Dahmash Mosque ===
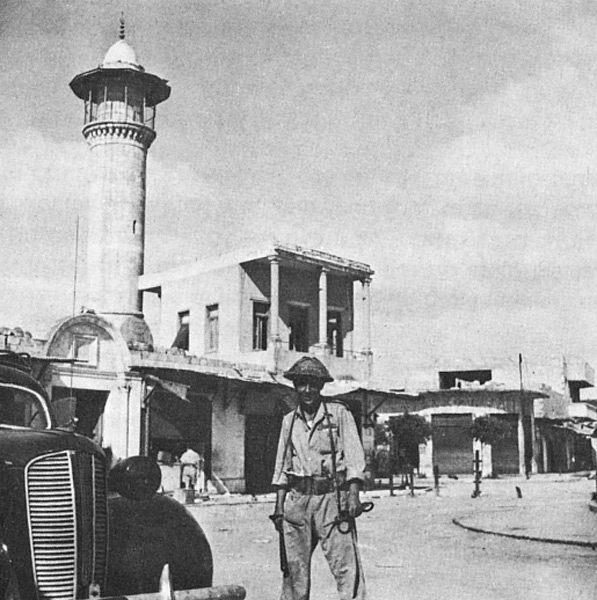
An Israeli soldier outside the Dahmash mosque in central Lydda

A number of Palestinians were killed in the Dahmash (Note: Arabic: دهمش. Also transliterated as "Dahamsh" or "Dahamish") Mosque. Historian Benny Morris writes that dozens of unarmed detainees were killed in the mosque. (Note: Morris 2004, "Dozens of unarmed detainees in one mosque compound, the Dahaimash Mosque, in the town centre, were shot and killed. Apparently, some of them tried to break out and escape, perhaps fearing that they would be massacred. IDF troops threw grenades and apparently fired PIAT (bazooka) rockets into the compound.") Historian Saleh Abdel Jawad estimated 175-250 killed in the mosque. Historian Ilan Pappé writes that 250 people were killed in the mosque. (Note: Pappé, I. (2020). An Indicative Archive: Salvaging Nakba Documents. Journal of Palestine Studies, 49(3), 22–40. https://doi.org/10.1525/jps.2020.49.3.22. "There is ample scholarly and journalistic evidence that 250 men, women, and children who had taken refuge in Lydda's great mosque were massacred") Historian Aref al-Aref estimated 176 were killed in the mosque. (Note: Henry Laurens, La Question de Palestine, Vol. 3, 2007 - "Selon Arif al-'Arif, [...] le nombre de morts arabes à Ludd lors des événements du 12 juillet s'élève à 426 dont 176 dans la mosquée. Machine translation: "According to Arif al-'Arif [...] the number of Arab deaths in Lydda during the events of July 12th amounts to 426, including 176 in the mosque.) Ari Shavit writes that "In thirty minutes, at high noon, more than two hundred civilians are killed."

An eyewitness published a memoir in 1998 saying he had removed 95 bodies from one of the mosques. In an interview with Zochrot circa 2013, former Palmach soldier Yerachmiel Kahanovich confessed to his role in the killings in Lydda's Dahamsh Mosque, testifying that he had fired a PIAT anti-tank missile with an enormous shock wave impact inside the mosque, killing many.

According to a February 26, 2026 Haaretz investigation, journalist Ari Shavit reconstructed the conquest of Lod (Lydda) on the basis of extensive interviews with commanders and fighters. The report states that after the city was captured, thousands of residents were gathered into two mosques and a church. The following day, two Jordanian armored vehicles reportedly entered the city by mistake, triggering renewed violence after residents believed an Arab relief force had arrived. According to the account cited, Israeli forces responded with widespread gunfire, the throwing of grenades into houses, and the firing of a PIAT shell into one of the mosques where civilians had taken refuge. Shavit, citing a confession from the fighter who fired the shell, estimated that approximately 200 civilians were killed within 30 minutes. The article further reports that after the violence subsided, David Ben-Gurion instructed Yigal Allon to expel the residents, and quotes a written order attributed to Yitzhak Rabin to the Yiftach Brigade stating that “the residents of Lod must be expelled quickly, regardless of age.” The PIAT shell incident described by Shavit is also referenced in materials from the Lahis trial published in the same investigation. According to battalion commander Yisrael Carmi, “In Lod they put hundreds of Arabs into a mosque and fired (PIAT) shells inside.”

=== Casualties ===
Historian Benny Morris writes that between 11:30 and 14:00 hours, "some 250" Palestinians were killed, citing the official Israeli military publication Sefer Ha-Palmach (Book of the Palmach). Palestinian historian Aref al-Aref estimated that 426 Palestinians were killed in Lydda on July 12, with 176 of that number being those killed in the mosque. (Note: Henry Laurens, La Question de Palestine, Vol. 3, 2007 - "Selon Arif al-'Arif, [...] le nombre de morts arabes à Ludd lors des événements du 12 juillet s'élève à 426 dont 176 dans la mosquée. Machine translation: "According to Arif al-'Arif [...] the number of Arab deaths in Lydda during the events of July 12th amounts to 426, including 176 in the mosque.) (Note: Pappé 2005, "Palestinian sources recount that in the mosque and in the streets nearby, where the Jewish troops went on yet another rampage of murder and pillage, 426 men, women and children were killed (176 bodies were found in the mosque).") Historian Nur Masalha wrote that "Dozens of unarmed civilians who were detained in the Dahmash Mosque and church premises of the town were gunned down and murdered. One official Israeli source put the casualty figures at 250 dead and many injured. It is likely, however, that somewhere between 250 and 400 Arabs were killed in this IDF massacre".

=== Aftermath ===
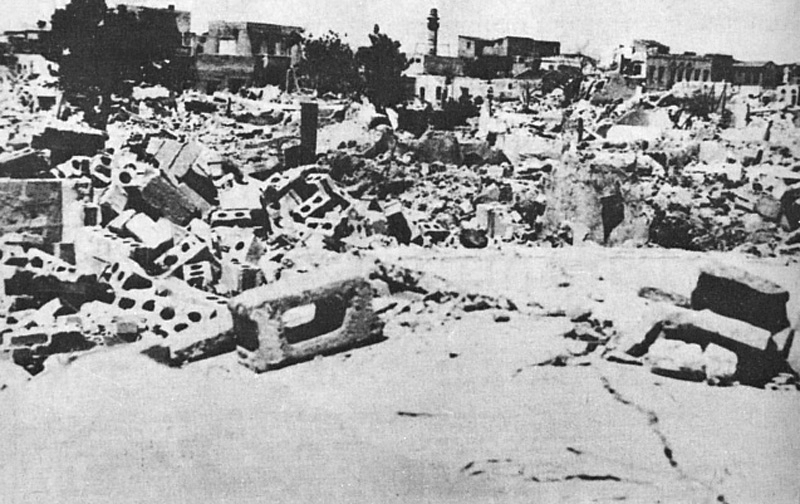
Ruins of Lydda after Israeli offensive

When the shooting was over, bodies lay in the streets and houses in Lydda, and on the Lydda–Ramle road. The Red Cross was due to visit the area, but the new Israeli military governor of Ramle issued an order to have the visit delayed. The visit was rescheduled for 14 July; Dani HQ ordered Israeli troops to remove the bodies by then, but the order seems not to have been carried out. Dr. Klaus Dreyer of the IDF Medical Corps complained on 15 July that there were still corpses lying in and around Lydda, which constituted a health hazard and a "moral and aesthetic issue." He asked that trucks and Arab residents be organized to deal with them.

== Expulsion of residents ==
=== Expulsion orders ===
Benny Morris writes that David Ben-Gurion and the IDF were largely left to their own devices to decide how Palestinian Arab residents were to be treated, without the involvement of the Cabinet and other ministers. As a result, their policy was haphazard and circumstantial, depending in part on the location, but also on the religion and ethnicity of the town. The Palestinian Arabs of Western and Lower Galilee, mainly Christian and Druze, were allowed to stay in place, but Lydda and Ramle, mainly Muslim, were almost completely emptied.

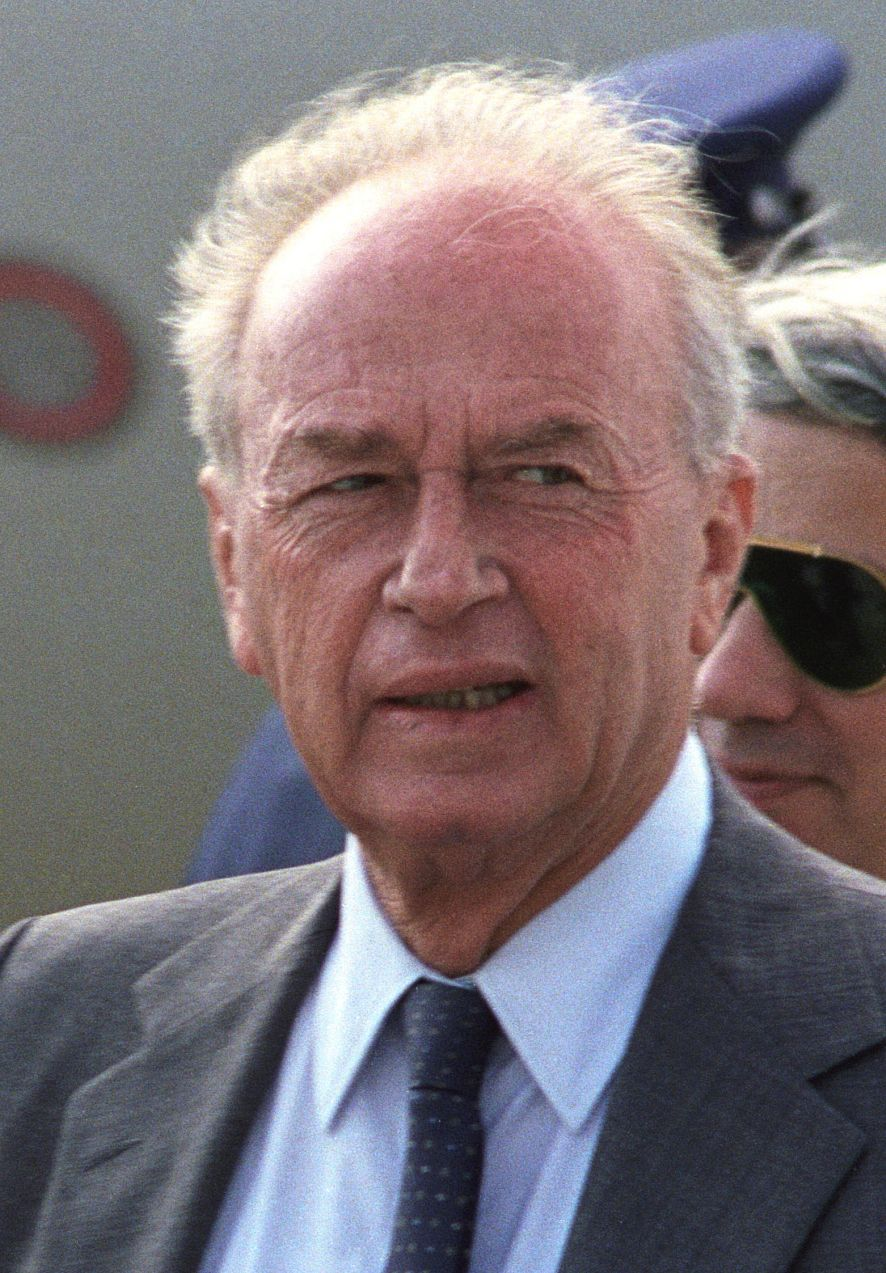
Yitzhak Rabin (1922–95) signed the expulsion order.

As the shooting in Lydda continued, a meeting was held on 12 July at Operation Dani headquarters between Ben-Gurion, Yigael Yadin and Zvi Ayalon, generals in the IDF, and Yisrael Galili, formerly of the Haganah, the pre-IDF army. Also present were Yigal Allon, commanding officer of Operation Dani, and Yitzhak Rabin. At one point Ben-Gurion, Allon, and Rabin left the room. Rabin has offered two accounts of what happened next. In a 1977 interview with Michael Bar-Zohar, Rabin said Allon asked what was to be done with the residents; in response, Ben-Gurion had waved his hand and said, "garesh otam"—"expel them." In the manuscript of his memoirs in 1979, Rabin wrote that Ben-Gurion had not spoken, but had "waved his hand in a gesture which said, 'Drive them out!'" The expulsion order for Lydda was issued at 13:30 hours on 12 July, signed by Rabin.

In his memoirs Rabin wrote: "'Driving out' is a term with a harsh ring. Psychologically, this was one of the most difficult actions we undertook. The population of Lod did not leave willingly." Yitzhak Rabin also wrote in his memoirs that some soldiers refused to take part in the evictions. Benny Morris writes that Israeli troops understood that what followed was an act of deportation, not a voluntary departure. While the residents were still in the towns, IDF radio traffic had already started calling them "refugees" after the expulsion orders were given.

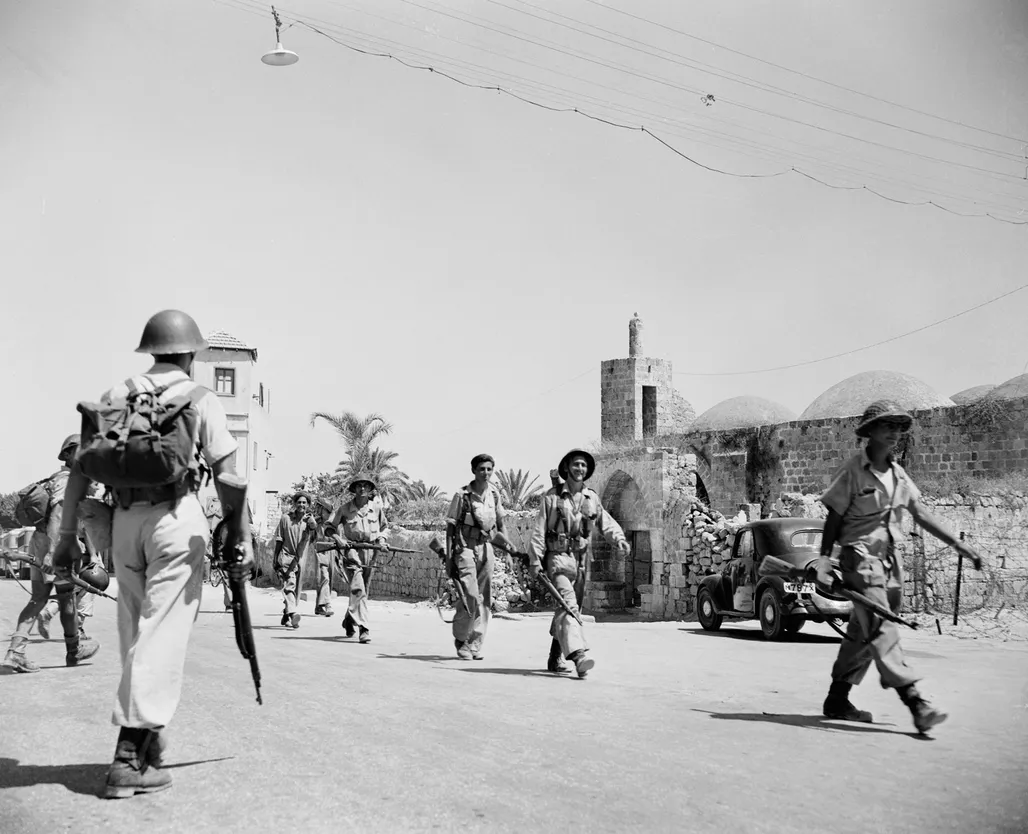
Israeli soldiers in Ramle

Operation Dani HQ told the IDF General Staff/Operations at noon on 13 July that "[the troops in Lydda] are busy expelling the inhabitants [oskim begeirush hatoshavim]," and told the HQs of Kiryati, 8th and Yiftah brigades at the same time that, "enemy resistance in Ramle and Lydda has ended. The eviction [pinui]" of the inhabitants... has begun."

=== Shitrit/Shertok intervention ===
The Israeli cabinet reportedly knew nothing about the expulsion plan until Bechor Shitrit, Minister for Minority Affairs, appeared unannounced in Ramle on 12 July. He was shocked when he realized troops were organizing expulsions. He returned to Tel Aviv for a meeting with Foreign Minister Moshe Shertok, who met with Ben Gurion to agree on guidelines for the treatment of the residents, though Morris writes that Ben Gurion apparently failed to tell Shitrit or Shertok that he himself was the source of the expulsion orders. Gelber disagrees with Morris's analysis, arguing that Ben-Gurion's agreement with Shitrit and Shertok is evidence that expulsion was not his intention, rather than evidence of his duplicity, as Morris implies. The men agreed the townspeople should be told that anyone who wanted to leave could do so, but that anyone who stayed was responsible for himself and would not be given food. Women, children, the old, and the sick were not to be forced to leave, and the monasteries and churches must not be damaged, though no mention was made of the mosques. Ben-Gurion passed the order to the IDF General Staff, who passed it to Dani HQ at 23:30 hours on 12 July, ten hours after the expulsion orders were issued; Morris writes that there was an ambiguity in the instruction that women, children and the sick were not to be forced to go: the word "lalechet" can mean either "go" or "walk". Satisfied that the order had been passed on, Shertok believed he had managed to avert the expulsions, not realizing that, even as he was discussing them in Tel Aviv, they had already begun.

=== Expulsion from Ramle ===
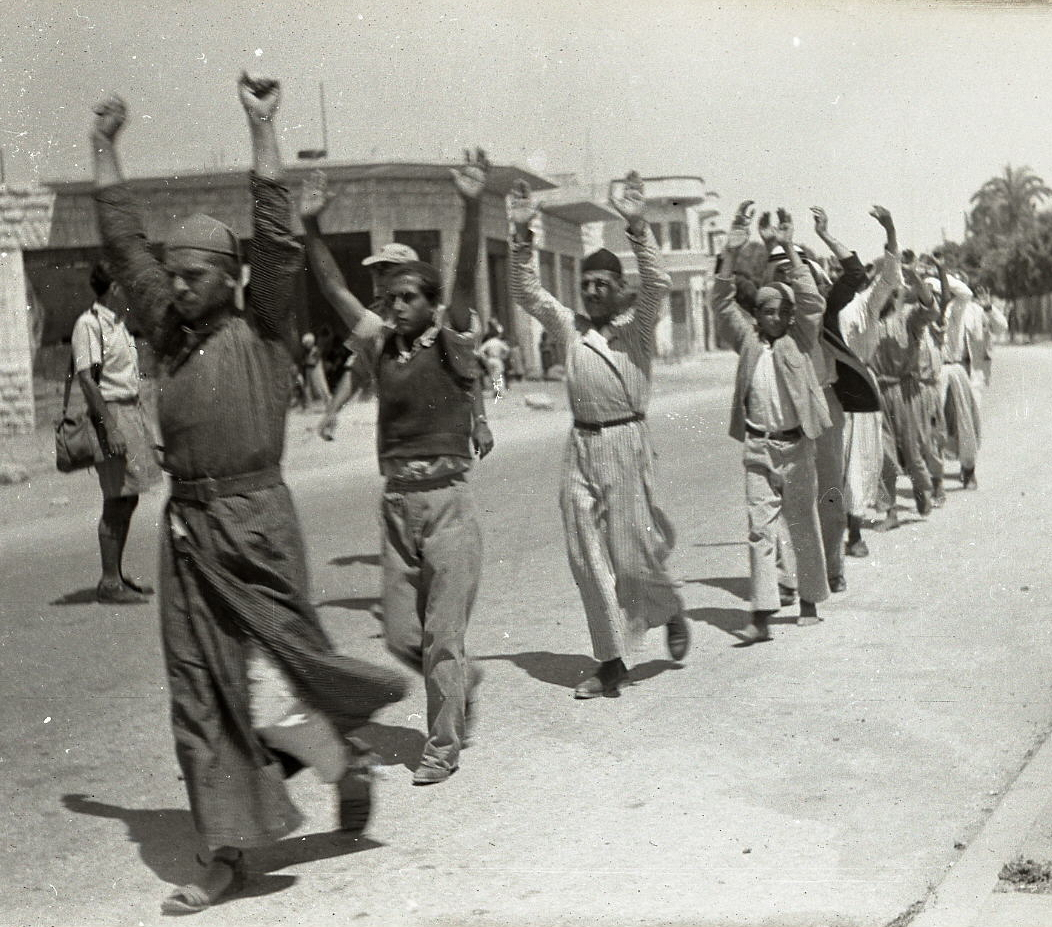
Palestinian detainees in Ramle

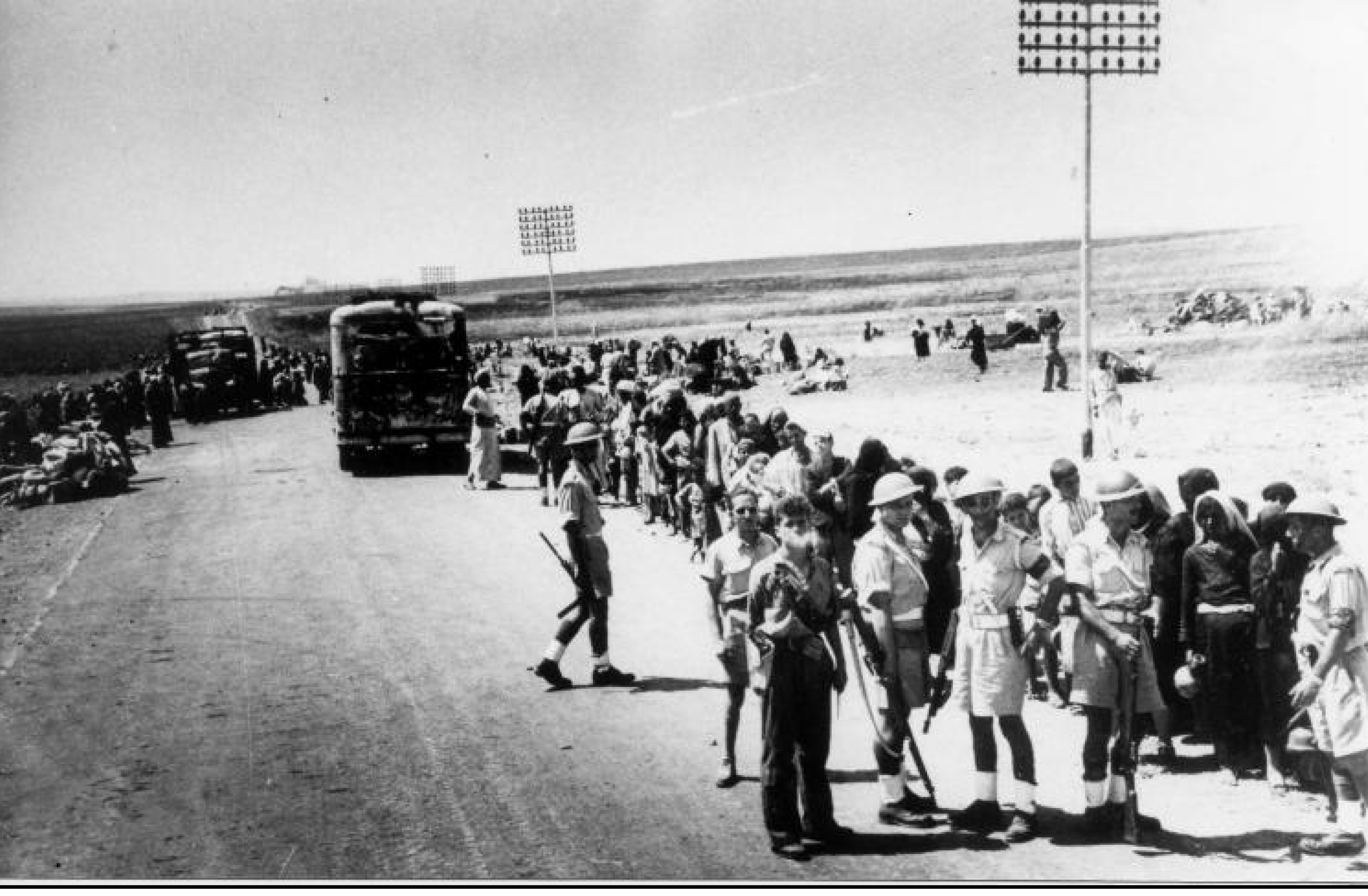
Photo of the expulsion from Ramle

Thousands of Ramle's residents began moving out of the town on foot, or in trucks and buses, between 10 and 12 July. The IDF used its own vehicles and confiscated Arab ones to move them. By 13 July the townspeople had undergone aerial bombardment, ground invasion, had seen grenades thrown into their homes and hundreds of residents killed, had been living under a curfew, had been abandoned by the Arab Legion, and the able-bodied men had been rounded up. Spiro Munayyer, an eyewitness, wrote that the important thing was to get out of the city. A deal was reached with an IDF intelligence officer, Shmarya Guttman, normally an archeologist, that the residents would leave in exchange for the release of the prisoners; according to Guttman, he went to the mosque himself and told the men they were free to join their families. Town criers and soldiers walked or drove around the town instructing residents where to gather for departure.

=== Expulsion from Lydda (Lydda Death March) ===
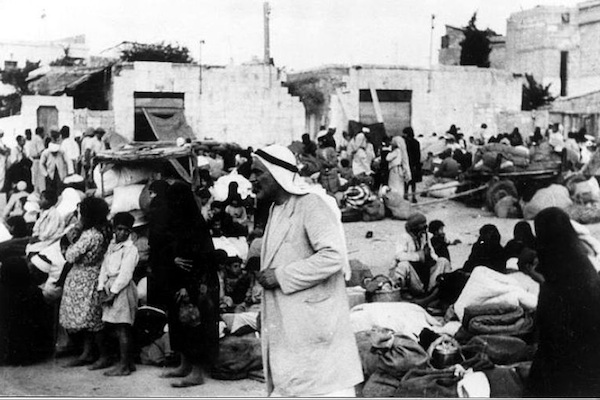
Residents of Lydda before their expulsion

A large number of people died in the expulsions from Lydda in what has become known as the Lydda death march.

Lydda's residents began moving out on the morning of 13 July. They walked six to seven kilometers to Beit Nabala, then 10–12 more to Barfiliya, along dusty roads in temperatures of 30–35 °C, carrying their children and portable possessions in carts pulled by animals or on their backs. Yitzhak Rabin wrote in his memoirs that "The population of Lod did not leave willingly. There was no way of avoiding the use of force and warning shots in order to make the inhabitants march the 10 to 15 miles to the point where they met up with the legion." Many of those expelled were stripped of their valuables en route by Israeli soldiers at checkpoints. Another IDF soldier described how possessions and people were slowly abandoned as the refugees grew tired or collapsed: "To begin with [jettisoning] utensils and furniture, and in the end, bodies of men, women, and children, scattered along the way."

A survivor named Haj As'ad Hassouneh, described to historian Saleh Abd al-Jawad his recollection in 1996: "The Jews came and they called among the people: "You must go." "Where shall we go?" "Go to Barfilia." ... the spot you were standing on determined what if any family or possession you could get; any to the west of you could not be retrieved. You had to immediately begin walking and it had to be to the east. ... The people were fatigued even before they began their journey or could attempt to reach any destination. No one knew where Barfilia was or its distance from Jordan. ... The people were also fasting due to Ramadan because they were people of serious belief. There was no water. People began to die of thirst. Some women died and their babies nursed from their dead bodies. Many of the elderly died on the way. ... Many buried their dead in the leaves of corn".

After three days of walking, the refugees were picked up by the Arab Legion and driven to Ramallah.

==== Casualties ====
Reports vary regarding how many died in the expulsion from Lydda. Many were elderly people and young children who died from the heat and exhaustion. Palestinian historian Aref al-Aref estimated 500 died in the expulsion from Lydda, and that 350 of that number died from thirst and exhaustion. Nimr al Khatib estimated that 335 died, a number which Israeli historian Benny Morris has called "certainly an exaggeration", while historian Michael Palumbo called Khatib's estimate "a very conservative figure." Morris writes that "a handful and perhaps dozens" died from dehydration and exhaustion. Nur Masalha estimated 350 deaths in the "expulsion and forced march" from Lydda. Glubb wrote that "nobody will ever know how many children died."

=== Robbing of refugees ===
There was widespread robbing of the refugees, with The Economist writing on 21 August 1948: "The Arab refugees were systematically stripped of all their belongings before they were sent on their trek to the frontier. Household belongings, stores, clothing, all had to be left behind." Aharon Cohen, director of Mapam's Arab Department, complained to Yigal Allon months after the deportations that troops had been told to remove jewellery and money from residents so that they would arrive at the Arab Legion without resources, thereby increasing the burden of looking after them. Allon replied that he knew of no such order, but conceded it was a possibility.

George Habash, one of the expelled who later founded the Popular Front for the Liberation of Palestine, said that the Israelis took watches, jewellery, gold, and wallets from the refugees, and that he witnessed a neighbour of his shot and killed since he refused to be searched.

== Looting ==
As the residents left, the sacking of the cities began. The Yiftah brigade commander, Lt. Col. Schmuel "Mula" Cohen, wrote of Lydda that, "the cruelty of the war here reached its zenith." Bechor Sheetrit, the Minister for Minority Affairs, said the army removed 1,800 truckloads of property from Lydda alone. Dov Shafrir was appointed Israel's Custodian of Absentee Property, supposedly charged to protect and redistribute Palestinian property, but his staff were inexperienced and unable to control the situation. The looting was so extensive that the 3rd Battalion had to be withdrawn from Lydda during the night of 13–14 July, and sent for a day to Ben Shemen for kinus heshbon nefesh, a conference to encourage soul-searching. Cohen forced them to hand over their loot, which was thrown onto a bonfire and destroyed, but the situation continued when they returned to town. Some were later prosecuted.

== Allegations of sexual violence ==
There were allegations that Israeli soldiers had raped Palestinian women. Ben-Gurion referred to them in his diary entry for 15 July 1948: "The bitter question has arisen regarding acts of robbery and rape [o'nes ("אונס")] in the conquered towns ...", Ben-Gurion then proceeds to write of the need to establish a special police force with authority to shoot such soldiers. Israeli writer Amos Kenan, who served as a platoon commander of the 82d Regiment of the Israeli Army brigade that conquered Lydda told The Nation on 6 February 1989: "At night, those of us who couldn't restrain ourselves would go into the prison compounds to fuck Arab women. I want very much to assume, and perhaps even can, that those who couldn't restrain themselves did what they thought the Arabs would have done to them had they won the war." Kenan said he heard of only one woman who complained. A court-martial was arranged, he said, but in court, the accused ran the back of his hand across his throat, and the woman decided not to proceed. The allegations were given little consideration by the Israeli government. Agriculture Minister Aharon Zisling told the Cabinet on 21 July: "It has been said that there were cases of rape in Ramle. I could forgive acts of rape but I won't forgive other deeds, which appear to me much graver. When a town is entered and rings are forcibly removed from fingers and jewellery from necks—that is a very grave matter."

== Casualties ==
Historian Michael Palumbo estimated 1,000 Palestinians died in the attacks on Lydda and Ramle. (Note: Palumbo 1987, "In all, probably about 1,000 Arab civilians died during and immediately after the expulsion from Lydda-Ramle.") Historian Saleh Abdel Jawad estimated 1,000 deaths "in the many phases of the Lod massacre". (Note: Saleh Abdel Jawad, 2007, Zionist Massacres: the Creation of the Palestinian Refugee Problem in the 1948 War: "1,000 casualties, for example in the many phases of the Lod massacre (our estimation)") Historian Aref al-Aref estimated 1,300 total dead in Lydda. (Note: Henry Laurens, La Question de Palestine, Vol. 3, 2007 - "Selon Arif al-'Arif, le seul à avoir tenté de faire un bilan chiffré, le nombre de morts arabes à Ludd lors des événements du 12 juillet s'élève à 426 dont 176 dans la mosquée. Le nombre total de morts se monte à 1,300 : 800 lors des combats de la ville, le reste dans l'exode." Machine translation: "According to Arif al-'Arif, the only one who has attempted to give a numerical assessment, the number of Arab deaths in Lydda during the events of July 12th amounts to 426, including 176 in the mosque. The total number of deaths amounts to 1,300 : 800 during the fighting in the city, the rest in the exodus.") Muhammad Nimr al Khatib estimated 1,700 total killed. (Note: Morris, B. (1986) Operation Dani and the Palestinian Exodus from Lydda and Ramle in 1948, Middle East Journal, 40(1), 82–109. http://www.jstor.org/stable/4327250. ""Nimr al-Khatib, in Be'einei Oyev, (In the Eyes of the Enemy) p. 36, wrote that the townspeople had revolted and 1,700 of them had been killed.") Historian Nur Masalha wrote that "Dozens of unarmed civilians who were detained in the Dahmash Mosque and church premises of the town were gunned down and murdered. One official Israeli source put the casualty figures at 250 dead and many injured. It is likely, however, that somewhere between 250 and 400 Arabs were killed in this IDF massacre; and an estimated 350 more died in the subsequent expulsion and forced march of the townspeople."

== Aftermath ==
=== In Ramallah, Amman, and elsewhere ===
Refugees from Lydda and Ramle after the three-day exodus

Tens of thousands of Palestinians from Lydda and Ramle poured into Ramallah. For the most part, they had no money, property, food, or water, and represented a health risk, not only to themselves. The Ramallah city council asked King Abdullah to remove them. Some of the refugees reached Amman, the Gaza Strip, Lebanon, and the Upper Galilee, and all over the area there were angry demonstrations against Abdullah and the Arab Legion for their failure to defend the cities. Local Palestinians spat at Glubb as he drove through the West Bank, and wives and parents of Arab Legion soldiers tried to break into King Abdullah's palace. Alec Kirkbride, the British ambassador in Amman, described one protest in the city on 18 July:

A couple of thousand Palestinian men swept up the hill toward the main [palace] entrance... screaming abuse and demanding that the lost towns should be reconquered at once... The King appeared at the top of the main steps of the building; he was a short, dignified figure wearing white robes and headdress. He paused for a moment, surveying the seething mob before, [then walked] down the steps to push his way through the line of guardsmen into the thick of the demonstrators. He went up to a prominent individual, who was shouting at the top of his voice, and dealt him a violent blow to the side of the head with the flat of his hand. The recipient of the blow stopped yelling... the King could be heard roaring: so, you want to fight the Jews, do you? Very well, there is a recruiting office for the army at the back of my house... go there and enlist. The rest of you, get the hell down the hillside!" Most of the crowd got the hell down the hillside.

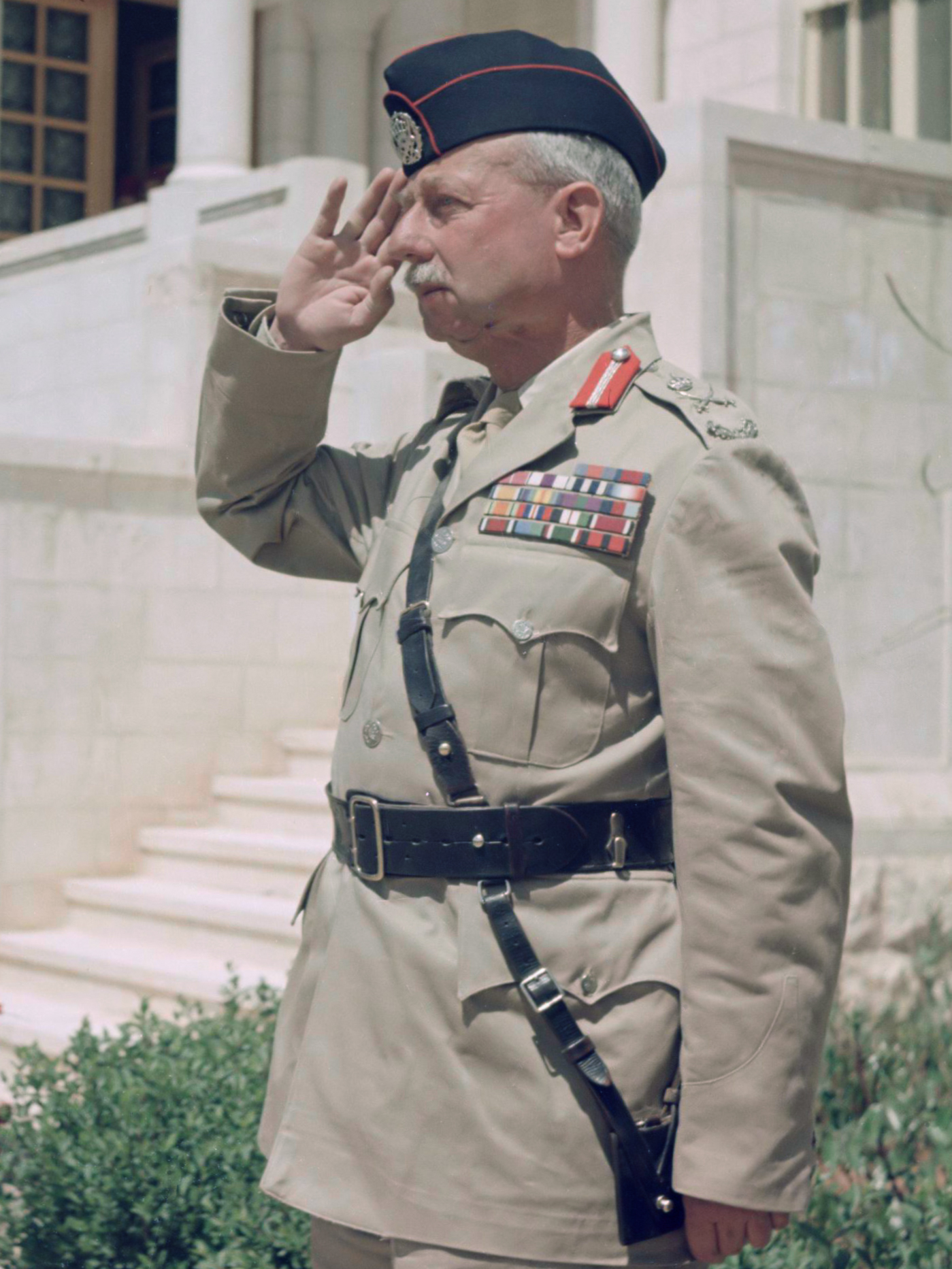
Glubb (pictured in 1953) was heavily criticized by Arab politicians for his perceived acceptance of the Israeli occupation of Lydda and Ramle.

Glubb quickly became the "butt of pan-Arab anger" for his perceived failures. During a meeting of the Political Committee of the Arab League in Amman on 12–13 July, several of the committee's delegates accused Glubb of serving British or even Jewish interests and claimed his concerns over troop and ammunition shortages were merely excuses. When Glubb went on an extended leave to England after the Ten Days, Egyptian journalists confronted him at the Cairo Airport, asking him questions such as "Why did you betray the Arab cause?" and "Why did you give Lydda and Ramla to the Jews?" Though King Abdullah was reluctant to do so, he summoned Glubb to a meeting of the Council of Ministers and laid the blame for the loss of Lydda and Ramla squarely on him. Abdullah dismissed Glubb's claims of ammunition shortages and indirectly suggested he resign from the Arab Legion. However, as the Legion was still engaged in battle, Glubb stayed on with some encouragement from the British government. The whole affair led Kirkbride to write that Britain had "reached a degree of unpopularity which I would have described as impossible six months ago." The United Nations Security Council called for a ceasefire to begin no later than 18 July, with sanctions to be levelled against transgressors. The Arabs were outraged: "No justice, no logic, no equity, no understanding, but blind submission to everything that is Zionist," Al-Hayat responded, though Morris writes that cooler heads in the Arab world were privately pleased that they were required not to fight, given Israel's obvious military superiority.

=== Situation of the refugees ===
Morris writes that the situation of the 400,000 Palestinian Arabs who became refugees that summer—not only those from Lydda and Ramle—was dire, camping in public buildings, abandoned barracks, and under trees. Count Folke Bernadotte, the United Nations mediator in Palestine, visited a refugee camp in Ramallah and said he had never seen a more ghastly sight. Morris writes that the Arab governments did little for them, and most of the aid that did reach them came from the West through the Red Cross and Quakers. A new UN body was set up to get things moving, which in December 1949 became the United Nations Relief and Works Agency for Palestine Refugees in the Near East (UNRWA), which many of the refugees and their descendants, now standing at four million, still depend on. Bernadotte's mediation efforts—which resulted in a proposal to split Palestine between Israel and Jordan, and to hand Lydda and Ramle to King Abdullah—ended on 17 September 1948, when he was assassinated by four Israeli gunmen from Lehi, an extremist Zionist faction.

=== Lausanne Conference ===
The United Nations convened the 1949 Lausanne Conference from April to September 1949 in part to resolve the refugee question. On 12 May 1949, the conference achieved its only success when the parties signed the Lausanne Protocol on the framework for a comprehensive peace, which included territories, refugees, and Jerusalem. Israel agreed in principle to allow the return of all of Palestinian refugees because the Israelis wanted United Nations membership, which required the settlement of the refugee problem. Once Israel was admitted to the UN, it retreated from the protocol it had signed, because it was completely satisfied with the status quo, and saw no need to make any concessions with regard to the refugees or on boundary questions. Israeli Foreign Minister Moshe Sharett had hoped for a comprehensive peace settlement at Lausanne, but he was no match for Prime Minister David Ben-Gurion, who saw the armistice agreements that stopped the fighting with the Arab states as sufficient, and put a low priority on a permanent peace treaty. On 3 August 1949, the Israeli delegation proposed the repatriation of 100,000 refugees, but not to their former homes, which had been destroyed or given to Jewish refugees from Europe; Israel would specify where the refugees would be relocated and the specific economic activities the refugees would be permitted to engage in. Also, the 100,000 would include 25,000 who had already returned illegally, so the actual total was only 75,000. The Americans felt it too low: they wanted to see 200,000–250,000 refugees taken back. The Arabs considered the Israeli offer was "less than token." When the '100,000 plan' was announced, the reaction of Israeli newspapers and political parties was uniformly negative. Soon after, the Israelis announced their offer had been withdrawn.

=== Resettlement of the cities ===
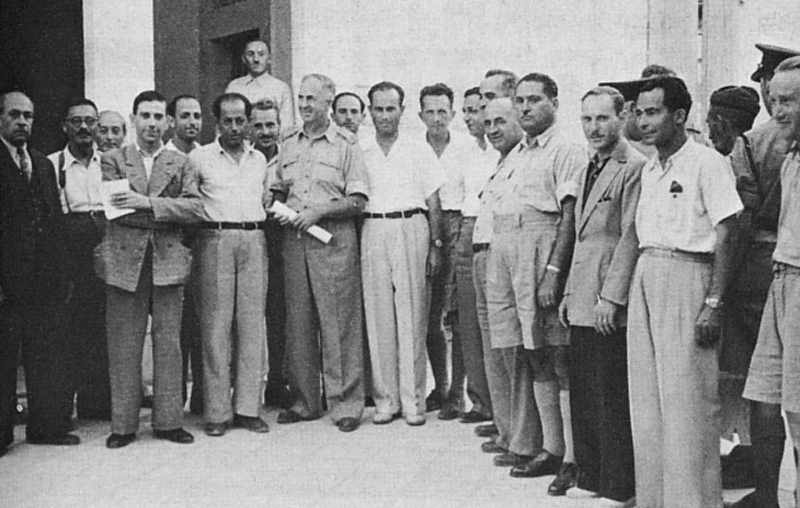
Power is handed from the military governor of Lydda, now called Lod, to the first mayor, Pesach Lev, April 1949.

On 14 July 1948 the IDF told Ben-Gurion that "not one Arab inhabitant" remained in Ramla or Lod, as they were now called. In fact, several hundred remained, including city workers who maintained essential city services like water service, and workers with expertise with the railroad train yards and the airport, the elderly, the ill and some Christians, and others who return to their homes over the following months. In October 1948 the Israeli military governor of Ramla-Lod reported that 960 Palestinians were living in Ramla, and 1,030 in Lod. Military rule in the towns ended in April 1949.

Nearly 700,000 Jews immigrated to Israel between May 1948 and December 1951 from Europe, Asia and Africa, doubling the state's Jewish population; in 1950 Israel passed the Law of Return, offering Jews automatic citizenship. The immigrants were assigned Palestinian homes—in part because of the inevitable housing shortage, but also as a matter of policy to make it harder for former residents to reclaim them—and could buy refugees' furniture from the Custodian for Absentees' Property. Jewish families were occasionally placed in houses belonging to Palestinians who still lived in Israel, the so-called "present absentees," regarded as physically present but legally absent, with no legal standing to reclaim their property. By March 1950 there were 8,600 Jews and 1,300 Palestinian Arabs living in Ramla, and 8,400 Jews and 1,000 Palestinians in Lod. Most of the Jews who settled in the towns were from Asia or North Africa.

The Palestinian workers allowed to remain in the cities were confined to ghettos. The military administrator split the region into three zones—Ramla, Lod, and Rakevet, a neighbourhood in Lod established by the British for rail workers—and declared the Arab areas within them "closed," with each closed zone run by a committee of three to five members. Many of the town's essential workers were Palestinians. The military administrators did satisfy some of their needs, such as building a school, supplying medical aid, allocating them 50 dunams for growing vegetables, and renovating the interior of the Dahmash mosque, but it appears the refugees felt like prisoners; Palestinian train workers, for example, were subject to a curfew from evening until morning, with periodic searches to make sure they had no guns. One wrote an open letter in March 1949 to the Al Youm newspaper on behalf of 460 Muslim and Christian train workers: "Since the occupation, we continued to work and our salaries have still not been paid to this day. Then our work was taken from us and now we are unemployed. The curfew is still valid ... [W]e are not allowed to go to Lod or Ramla, as we are prisoners. No one is allowed to look for a job but with the mediation of the members of the Local Committee ... we are like slaves. I am asking you to cancel the restrictions and to let us live freely in the state of Israel.

=== Lod and Ramla today ===
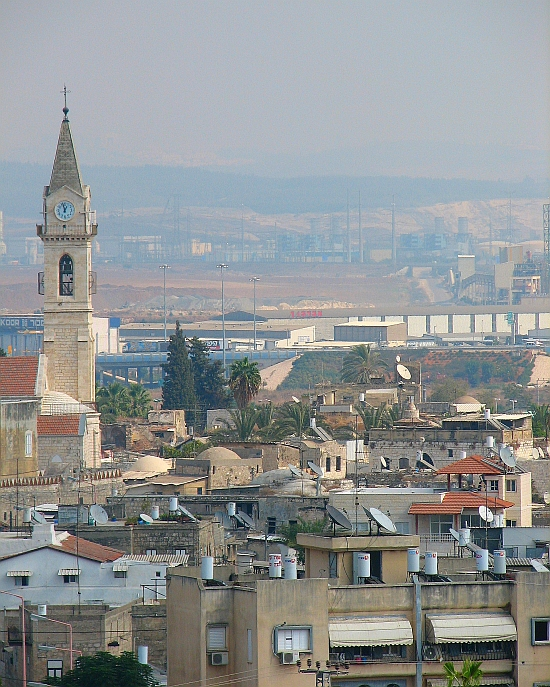
Ramla in 2006

As of 2013 around 69,000 people were living in Ramla. The population in Lod as of 2010 was officially around 45,000 Jews and 20,000 Arabs; its main industry is its airport, renamed Ben Gurion International Airport in 1973. Beth Israel immigrants from Ethiopia were housed there in the 1990s, increasing the ethnic tension in the city. In 2010 a three-meter-high wall was built to separate the Jewish and Arab neighbourhoods.

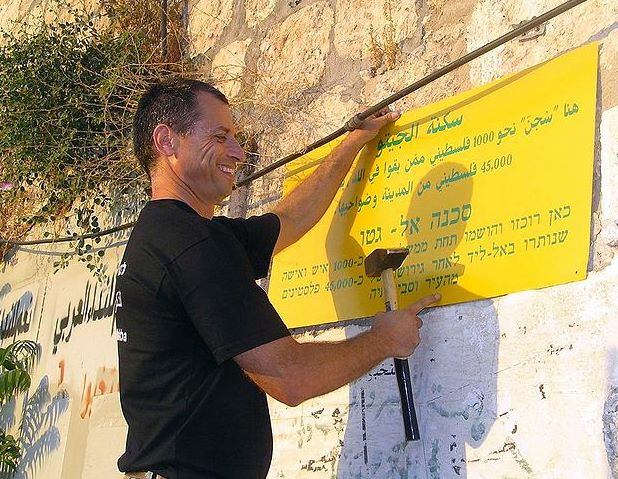
Eitan Bronstein of Zochrot places a sign on the former Lydda ghetto.

The Arab community has complained that, when Arabs became a majority in Lod's Ramat Eshkol suburb, the local school was closed rather than turned into an Arab-sector school, and in September 2008 it was re-opened as a yeshiva, a Jewish religious school. The local council acknowledges that it wants Lod to become a more Jewish city. In addition to the Arabs officially registered, a fifth of the overall population are Bedouin, who arrived in Lod in the 1980s when they were moved off land in the Negev, according to Nathan Jeffay.They live in dwellings deemed illegal by Israeli authorities on agricultural land, unregistered and with no municipal services.

The refugees are occasionally able to visit their former homes. Zochrot, an Israeli group that researches former Palestinian towns, visited Lod in 2003 and 2005, erecting signs in Hebrew and Arabic depicting its history, including a sign on the wall of the former Arab ghetto. The visits are met with a mixture of interest and hostility. Father Oudeh Rantisi, a former mayor of Ramallah who was expelled from Lydda in 1948, visited his family's former home for the first time in 1967:

As the bus drew up in front of the house, I saw a young boy playing in the yard. I got off the bus and went over to him. "How long have you lived in this house?" I asked. "I was born here," he replied. "Me too," I said ...

=== Four figures after the exodus ===
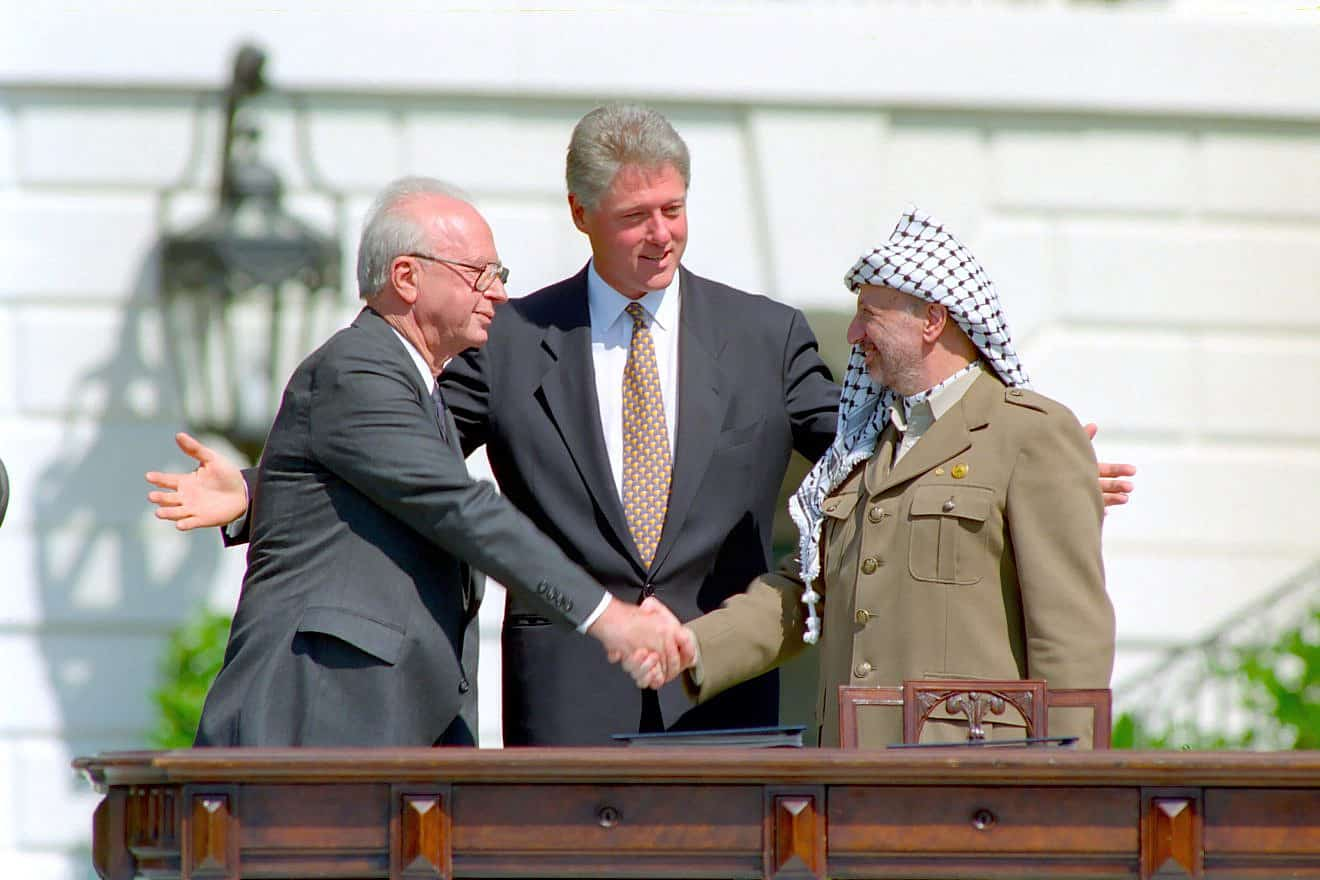
Yitzhak Rabin's historic handshake with Yasser Arafat at the White House, 1993

Yitzhak Rabin, Allon's operations officer, who signed the Lydda expulsion order, became Chief of Staff of the IDF during the Six-Day War, and Israel's prime minister in 1974 and again in 1992. He was assassinated in 1995 by a right-wing Israeli radical opposed to making peace with the PLO.

Yigal Allon, who led Operation Dani and may have ordered the expulsions, became Israel's deputy prime minister in 1967. He was a member of the war cabinet during the 1967 Arab Israeli Six-Day War, and the architect of the post-war Allon Plan, a proposal to end Israel's occupation of the West Bank. He died in 1980.

Khalil al-Wazir, the grocer's son expelled from Ramle, became one of the founders of Yasser Arafat's Fatah faction within the PLO, and specifically of its armed wing, Al-Assifa. He organised the PLO's guerrilla warfare and the Fatah youth movements that helped spark the First Intifada in 1987. He was assassinated by Israeli commandos in Tunis in 1988.

George Habash, the medical student expelled from Lydda, went on to lead one of the best-known of the Palestinian militant groups, the Popular Front for the Liberation of Palestine. In September 1970 he masterminded the hijacking of four passenger jets bound for New York, an attack that put the Palestinian cause on the map. The PFLP was also behind the 1972 Lod Airport massacre, in which 27 people died, and the 1976 hijacking of an Air France flight to Entebbe, which famously led to the IDF's rescue of the hostages. Habash died of a heart attack in Amman in 2008.

== Historiography ==
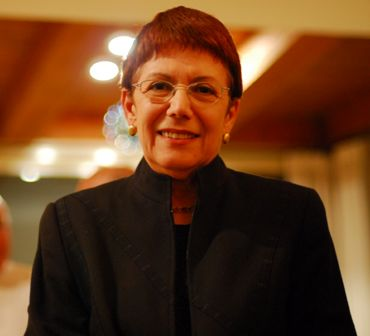
Israeli historian Anita Shapira argues that the scholars who wrote the early history of 1948 censored themselves, because they saw the 1948 war as the tragic climax of the Holocaust and the Second World War.

Benny Morris argues that Israeli historians from the 1950s throughout the 1970s—who wrote what he calls the "Old History"—were "less than honest" about what had happened in Lydda and Ramle. Anita Shapira calls them "the Palmach generation": historians who had fought in the 1948 Arab–Israeli War, and who thereafter went to work for the IDF's history branch, where they censored material other scholars had no access to. For them, Shapira writes, the Holocaust and the Second World War—including the experience of Jewish weakness in the face of persecution—made the fight for land between the Arabs and Jews a matter of life and death, the 1948 war the "tragic and heroic climax of all that had preceded it," and Israeli victory an "act of historical justice."

The IDF's official history of the 1948 war, Toldot Milhemet HaKomemiyut ("History of the War of Independence"), published in 1959, said that residents of Lydda had violated the terms of their surrender, and left because they were afraid of Israeli retribution. The head of the IDF history branch, Lt. Col Netanel Lorch, wrote in The Edge of the Sword (1961) that they had requested safe conduct from the IDF; American political scientist Ian Lustick writes that Lorch admitted in 1997 that he left his post because the censorship made it impossible to write good history. Another employee of the history branch, Lt. Col. Elhannan Orren, wrote a detailed history of Operation Dani in 1976 that made no mention of expulsions.

Arab historians published accounts, including Aref al-Aref's Al Nakba, 1947–1952 (1956–1960), Muhammad Nimr al-Khatib's Min Athar al-Nakba (1951), and several papers by Walid Khalidi. Israeli and Western academia were dismissive of these early Arab historian accounts, with Benny Morris for example criticizing them for relying on oral testimony rather than documentary evidence. The first person in Israel to acknowledge the Lydda and Ramle expulsions, according Morris, was Yitzhak Rabin in his 1979 memoirs, though that part of his manuscript was removed by government censors.

Material in the Israeli archives was not available for decades after the war, but when the 30-year rule of Israel's Archives Law (passed in 1955) it meant that hundreds of thousands of government documents were released throughout the 1980s. Basing their research on these newly available documents, a number of historians today known as the New Historians emerged. Shapira writes that they focused on the 700,000 Palestinian Arabs who were uprooted by the war, not on the 6,000 Jews who died during it, and assessed the behavior of the Jewish state as they would that of any other. Between 1987 and 1993, four of these historians in particular—Morris himself, Simha Flapan, Ilan Pappé, and Avi Shlaim—three of them Oxbridge-trained, published a series of books that changed the historiography of the Palestinian exodus. According to Lustick, although it was known in academic circles that the Palestinians had left because of expulsions and intimidation, it was largely unknown to Israeli Jews until Morris's The Birth of the Palestinian Refugee Problem, 1947–1949 appeared in 1987.

The work of the New Historians have been criticized by a number of Israeli historians such as Efraim Karsh, who writes that there was more voluntary Palestinian flight than Morris and others concede. He acknowledges that there were expulsions, particularly in Lydda, though he argues—as does Morris—that they resulted from decisions made in the heat of battle, and account for a small percentage of the overall exodus. Karsh argues that the New Historians have turned the story of the birth of Israel upside down, making victims of the Arab aggressors, though he acknowledges that the New History is now widely accepted. The positions of Karsh and Morris, though they disagree, contrast in turn with those of Ilan Pappé and Walid Khalidi, who argue not only that there were widespread expulsions, but also that they were not the result of ad hoc decisions. Rather, they argue, the expulsions were part of a deliberate strategy, known as Plan Dalet and conceived before Israel's declaration of independence, to transfer the Arab population and seize their land—in Pappé's words, to ethnically cleanse the country.

Ari Shavit devotes a chapter of his book My Promised Land (2013) to the expulsion, and calls the events "our black box, . . In it lies the dark secret of Zionism."

=== Expulsion orders ===
In his memoirs Yitzhak Rabin wrote: "'Driving out' is a term with a harsh ring. Psychologically, this was one of the most difficult actions we undertook. The population of Lod did not leave willingly. There was no way of avoiding the use of force and warning shots in order to make the inhabitants march the 10 to 15 miles to the point where they met up with the legion." An Israeli censorship board removed this section from his manuscript, but Peretz Kidron, the Israeli journalist who translated the memoirs into English, passed the censored text to David Shipler of The New York Times, who published it on 23 October 1979.

In an interview with The New York Times two days later, Yigal Allon took issue with Rabin's version of events. "With all my high esteem for Rabin during the war of independence, I was his commander and my knowledge of the facts is therefore more accurate," he told Shipler. "I did not ask the late Ben-Gurion for permission to expel the population of Lydda. I did not receive such permission and did not give such orders." He said the residents left in part because they were told to by the Arab Legion, so the latter could recapture Lydda at a later date, and in part because they were panic-stricken. Yoav Gelber also takes issue with Rabin's account. He writes that Ben-Gurion was in the habit of expressing his orders clearly, whether verbally or in writing, and would not have issued an order by waving his hand; he adds that there is no record of any meetings before the invasion that indicate expulsion was discussed. He attributes the expulsions to Allon, who he says was known for his scorched earth policy. Wherever Allon was in charge of Israeli troops, Gelber writes, no Palestinians remained. Whereas traditional historiography in Israel has insisted that Palestinian refugees left their lands under the orders of Arab leaders, some Israeli scholars have challenged this view in recent years.

=== Lydda massacre ===
Israeli historians Alon Kadish and Avraham Sela state that there is no direct first-hand evidence that a massacre took place and that the deaths in Lydda occurred during a military battle for the town, not because of a massacre. This view has been widely criticised. (Note: Cohen, G.D. (2014). Elusive Neutrality: Christian Humanitarianism and the Question of Palestine, 1948–1967. Humanity: An International Journal of Human Rights, Humanitarianism, and Development5(2), 183-210. https://dx.doi.org/10.1353/hum.2014.0016. "But as elsewhere in Palestine since March 1948, the eviction of Arab civilians and the wholesale destruction of their localities did not merely occur 'in the context of heavy fighting and unexpected military circumstances,' as some historians prefer to maintain.") John W. Poole quoted Kadish and Sela's paper as saying that on the morning of 12 July 1948, "The Palmach forces [in Lydda] came under heavy fire from 'thousands of weapons from every house, roof and window' sustaining heavy casualties." Poole continued: "These assertions seem to be the foundation for much of the argument advanced in the article. I think that the authors should have furnished much more information about their precise meaning, factual validity, and sources.... [Benny Morris] does not say how many townspeople were involved in the fighting but his account certainly suggests a number of Arab gunmen very much smaller than several thousand." James Bowen is also critical. He places a cautionary note on the UCC web site: "... it is based on a book written by the same authors which was published in 2000 by the Israeli Ministry of Defence." Kadish and Sela also wrote that, according to the 3rd Battalion's commander, Moshe Kelman, the Israelis came under heavy fire from "thousands of weapons from every house, roof and window". Morris calls this "nonsense" and argues that only a few dozen townspeople took part in what turned out to be a brief firefight.

== In art ==
Ismail Shammout's Where to ...? (1953)

The Palestinian artist Ismail Shammout (1930–2006) was 19 years old when he was expelled from Lydda. He created a series of oil paintings about the march, the best known of which is Where to ...? (1953), which enjoys iconic status among Palestinians. A life-size image of a man dressed in rags holds a walking stick in one hand, the wrist of a child in the other, a toddler on his shoulder, with a third child behind him, crying and alone. There is a withered tree behind him, and in the distance the skyline of an Arab town with a minaret. Gannit Ankori writes that the absent mother is the lost homeland, the children its orphans.

Israeli poet Natan Alterman (1910–1970) wrote the poem Al Zot ("On This"), which historians consider to have been written about the violence in Lydda, although it may have been written about the Dawayima massacre instead. (Note: Hever, Hannan. "Chapter 2 "Tell It Not in Gath": the Palestinian Nakba in Hebrew Poetry 1948–1958". In Hebrew Literature and the 1948 War, (Leiden, The Netherlands: Brill, 2019) doi: https://doi.org/10.1163/9789004377608_004. "In all likelihood, the subject of Alterman's poem was the massacre that took place in the town of Lydda on July 12, 1948 (according to Menachem Finkelstein, however, the poem was written about the massacre in Dawayima that took place at the end of October in 1948).) (Note: This source also (https://humanities1.tau.ac.il/segel/oppenyo/files/2014/09/Oppenheimer-Alterman.pdf) says the poem was written about Dawayima) Historian Benny Morris writes that what the poem describes "conforms to what happened in Dayan's raid in Lydda—and the poem does speak explicitly of an incident in a town or city (ir) and not a village (kfar)." Published in Davar on 19 November 1948, the poem is about an Israeli soldier during the 1948 war machine-gunning an Arab. Two days later Ben-Gurion sought Alterman's permission for the Defence Ministry to distribute the poem throughout the IDF.

Let us sing then also about "delicate incidents"
For which the true name, incidentally, is murder
Let songs be composed about conversations with sympathetic interlocutors
who with collusive chuckles make concessions and grant forgiveness.

== See also ==
- Killings and massacres during the 1948 Palestine war
- Lod Airport massacre
