= Al-'Asifah =

Armed Wing of Fatah

- العاصفة
- Leaders: Yasser Arafat; Khalil al-Wazir Abu Sahib
- Dates active: 1 January 1965–2000 (Fatah) 2023–today (New Group)
- Active regions: Palestine; Israel; Jordan; Lebanon
- Ideology: Palestinian nationalism Palestinian self-determination Arab socialism Anti-Zionism; Anti-imperialism
- Part of: Fatah (until 2000)
- Wars: War of Attrition; Black September; Lebanese Civil War; First Intifada

Al-ʿAsifah (Arabic: العاصفة, romanized: al-ʿĀṣifah, lit. 'the Storm') was the mainstream armed wing of the Palestinian political party and militant group Fatah. Al-Asifah was jointly led by Yasser Arafat and Khalil Wazir.

== History ==
On New Year's Day 1965, Fatah announced the formation of its military wing, called the al-Asifah forces, in Military Communique No. 1. This statement reported Asifah's first guerrilla attacks against Israel and officially declared the launch of the armed struggle for Palestinian independence. At the time, Fatah was far from ready for sustained military activity. Although al-Asifah was rooted in the organized guerrilla movements known as the Fedayeen, it had few trained volunteers and even fewer serviceable arms.

Its first attempted raid occurred on December 31, 1964, but was hindered when the fighters were detained by the Lebanese Armed Forces while planning to demolish a pumping station of the Israeli national water carrier. The following night a second al-Asifah unit infiltrated the border south of Lake Tiberius and laid explosive satchel in a water canal, which never detonated. In its early years, al-Asifah's direct military impact was negligible and their activities remained limited in scope and effectiveness. By the end of its first year, al-Asifah claimed to have carried out over 110 operations within Israeli territory. However, Israeli sources credit al-Asifah with a total of only 35 operations for the same time period.

Overall, al-Asifah only had limited success in spearheading an armed struggle against Israel. Its operations were more symbolic than effective, and their impact was more psychological than physical. Over time, the majority of al-Asifah forces were incorporated into the Palestine Liberation Organization armed wing, the Palestinian Liberation Army. Although some units retained the name al-Asifah throughout the 1980s and 1990s, Fatah eventually re-branded its armed wing from al-Asifah to the Al-Aqsa Martyrs' Brigades following the outbreak of the Al-Aqsa Intifada in 2000. However, an armed group which retained the name Al-'Asifah has participated in the ongoing Gaza war (2023-present) on the side of Hamas.

== Relations with Arab countries ==
Most Arab countries viewed al-Asifah's guerilla activities as reckless adventurism that could result in an untimely war with Israel. In 1965, the Lebanese Army Command requested that the Lebanese press stop publishing al-Asifah communiques and news of its operations. In January 1966, Arab representatives of the Mixed Armistice Commission demanded an end to activities by al-Asifah on the grounds that they were ineffective and causing Israeli reprisals. Measures to curb such incursions were agreed on. King Hussein of Jordan quietly but forcefully tried to prevent al-Asifah from operating in Jordanian territory. The first one of al-Asifah's men to die in action was killed by Jordanian border patrols while his unit was returning from a mission in Israel.

The only country to support the position of al-Asifah was Syria. The Baathist regime in power in 1966 had officially adopted the strategy of popular war of liberation as the only adequate method for achieving the liberation of Palestine. They offered to host al-Asifah's headquarters and allowed its members freedom of movement in Syria.

== Role of women ==
Only after the pan-Arab defeat in the Six-Day War did leading al-Asifah authorities, including its leader Yasser Arafat, begin to seriously consider the inclusion of women in its militias. Al-Asifah began tacitly recruiting women fighters who participated in armed activities from 1967 to 1968. It was not until 1981 that al-Asifah initiated an overt general mobilization campaign in which hundreds of young female students were being trained in military tactics by al-Asifah. However, very few women who participated in the campaign were actually called upon to serve in actions against Israel. Once the women who participated in these training camps were finished with their training they were generally sent back home and not matriculated into the ranks of al-Asifah.

Dalal Mughrabi is one of al-Asifah's most famous female militants. She participated in the 1978 Coastal Road attack in which a group of al-Asifah fighters hijacked a bus, leading to a shoot-out with Israeli authorities. Mughrabi died during the course of the attack, and has since been hailed as an important Palestinian martyr and national hero.

== See also ==
- Battle of Karameh
