= Jordan Valley =

Rift valley in Israel, Palestine and Jordan

Coordinates: 32°19′02″N 35°34′12″E

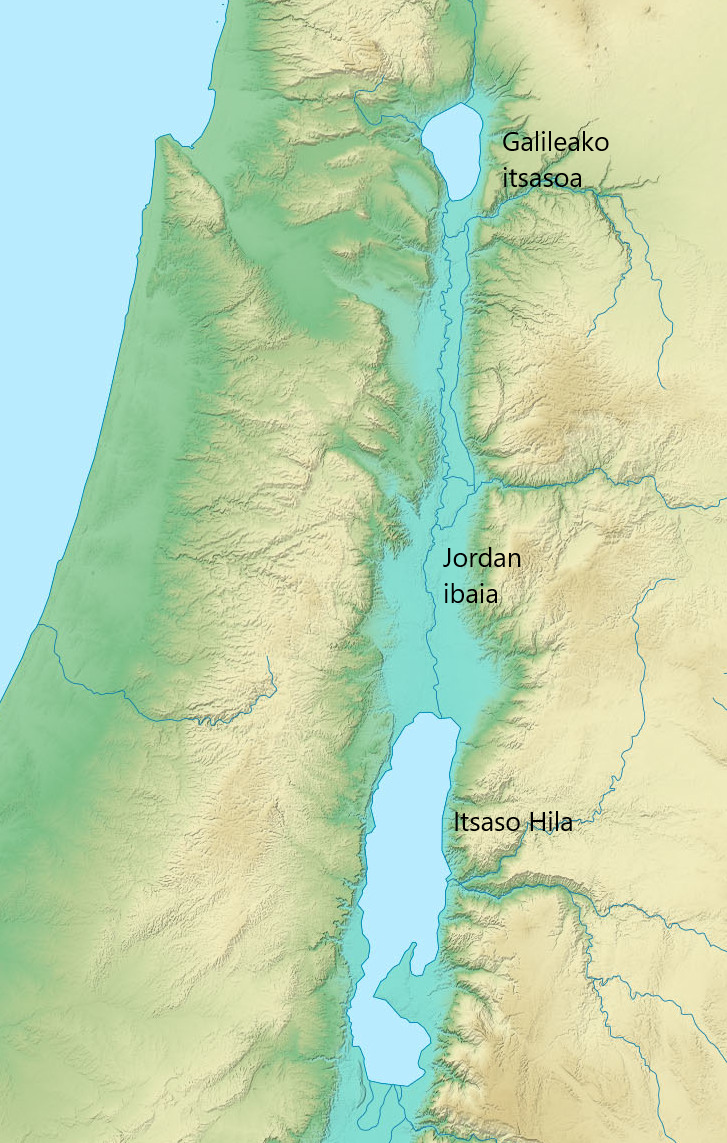
Jordan Valley from the Sea of Galilee in the north to the Dead Sea in the south

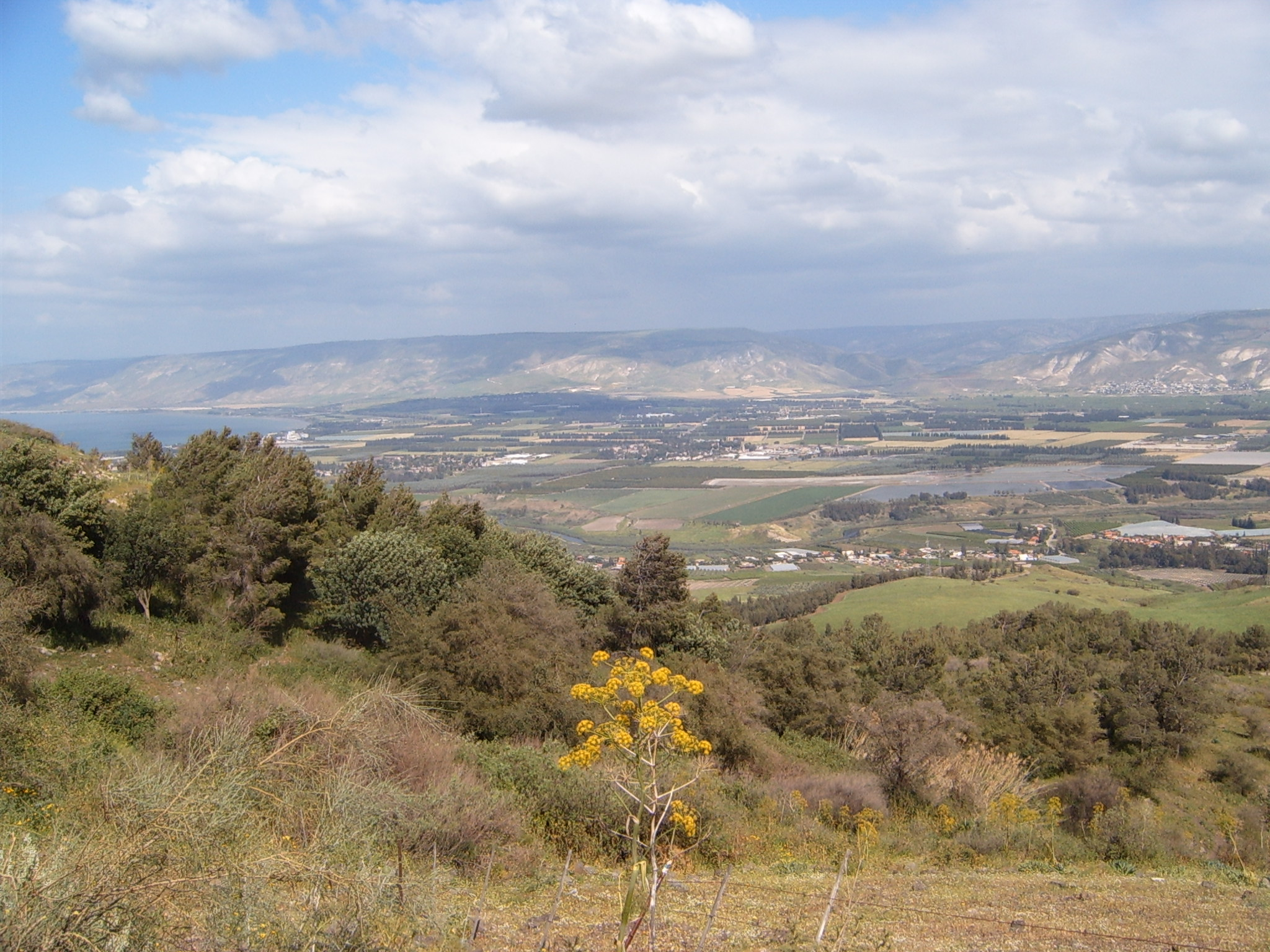
Jordan Valley

The Jordan Valley (Arabic: غَوْر الأُرْدُنّ, romanized: Ghawr al-Urdunn; Hebrew: עֵמֶק הַיַרְדֵּן, romanized: Emek HaYarden) forms part of the larger Jordan Rift Valley. Unlike most other river valleys, the term "Jordan Valley" often applies just to the lower course of the Jordan River, from the spot where it exits the Sea of Galilee in the north, to the end of its course where it flows into the Dead Sea in the south. In a wider sense, the term may also cover the Dead Sea basin and the Arabah valley, which is the rift valley segment beyond the Dead Sea and ending at Aqaba/Eilat, 155 km (96 mi) farther south.

The valley, in the common, narrow sense, is a long and narrow trough, 105 km (65 mi) long if measured "as the crow flies", with a width averaging 10 km (6.2 mi) with some points narrowing to 4 km (2.5 mi) over most of the course, before widening out to a 20 km (12 mi) delta when reaching the Dead Sea. Due to meandering, the length of the river itself is 220 km (140 mi). This is the valley with the lowest elevation in the world, beginning at −212 m (−696 ft) below sea level (BSL) and terminating at less than −400 m (−1,300 ft) BSL. On both sides, to the east and west, the valley is bordered by high, steep escarpments rising from the valley floor by between 1,200 m (3,900 ft) to 1,700 m (5,600 ft).

Over most of its length, the Jordan Valley forms the border between Jordan to the east, and Israel and the West Bank to the west. The details are regulated by the Israel–Jordan peace treaty of 1994, which establishes an "administrative boundary" between Jordan and the West Bank, occupied by Israel since 1967, without prejudice to the status of that territory. Israel has allocated 86% of the land, in the West Bank portion of the valley, to Israeli settlements. Annexation of the Jordan Valley to Israel has been proposed by a variety of Israeli politicians, most recently Benjamin Netanyahu in September 2019.

== Geography ==
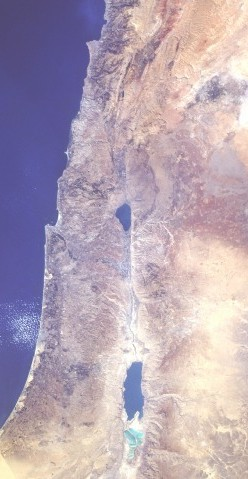
Satellite map and diagram showing the Jordan valley on either side of the Jordan River

According to the definition used in this article, what is elsewhere sometimes termed the Upper Jordan Valley is not considered part of the Jordan Valley. The Upper Jordan Valley comprises the Jordan River sources and the course of the Jordan River through the Hula Valley and the Korazim Plateau, both north of the Sea of Galilee.

The lower part of the valley, known as the Ghor (from the Arabic Ghawr or Ghōr, غور), includes the Jordan River segment south of the Sea of Galilee which ends at the Dead Sea. Several degrees warmer than adjacent areas, its year-round agricultural climate, fertile soils and water supply have made the Ghor a key agricultural area.

South of the Dead Sea, the continuation of the larger Jordan Rift Valley contains the hot, dry area known as Wadi 'Araba, the "wilderness" or "Arabah desert" of the Bible.

== Demography ==
=== Jordanians ===
Prior to the 1967 Six-Day War, the valley's Jordanian side was home to about 60,000 people largely engaged in agriculture and pastoralism. By 1971, the Valley's Jordanian population had declined to 5,000 as a result of the 1967 war and the 1970–71 "Black September" war between the Palestine Liberation Organization and Jordan. Investments by the Jordanian government in the region allowed the population to rebound to over 85,000 by 1979. 80% of the farms in the Jordanian part of the valley are family farms no larger than 30 dunams (3 ha, 7.4 ac).

=== Palestinians ===
Population levels in the past are unclear. According to the PLO, before 1967, there were approximately 250,000 Palestinians living in the part of the valley that lies in the West Bank. As of 2009, the number of Palestinians remaining in this area was approximately 58,000, living in about twenty permanent communities, mostly concentrated in the city of Jericho and communities in the greater Jericho area in the south of the valley. Of these, approximately 10,000 live in Area C which is administered by the Israeli Coordinator of Government Activities in the Territories, including approximately 2,700 people who live in small Bedouin and herding communities.

=== Israelis ===
Inside pre-1967 borders, 17,332 Israelis live in the independent municipality of Beit She'an, 12,000 live in 24 communities in Valley of Springs Regional Council that are located in the valley. An additional 12,400 live in 22 communities in the Emek HaYarden Regional Council whose southern half is in the valley.

In the West Bank the Israeli Bik'at HaYarden Regional Council contains 21 settlements with a total of 4,200 residents as of 2014, and the independent municipality of Ma'ale Efrayim an additional 1,206 as of 2015.

== Migration route ==
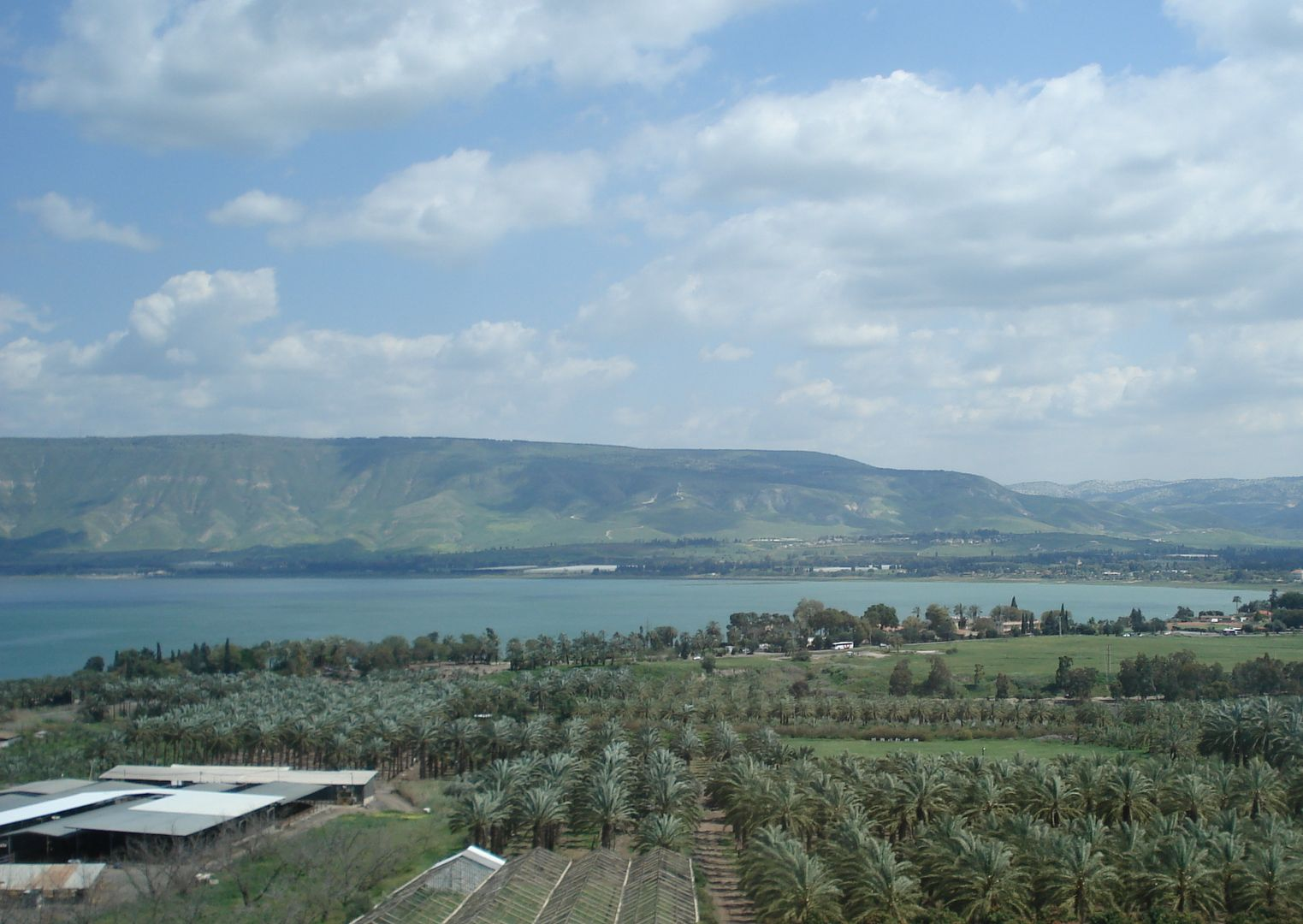
The Sea of Galilee. At its southern tip (right side) the Jordan River exits the lake and enters the Jordan Valley.

The Jordan Valley is part of the Levantine corridor and constitutes a route for animal migration, including in the past for the developing human species.

=== Early humans ===
Genetic studies indicate that during the Paleolithic and Mesolithic periods, the Levantine corridor, of which the Jordan Valley is one part, was more important for bi-directional human migrations between Africa and Eurasia than was the Horn of Africa.

=== Birds ===
Nowadays the Jordan Valley still is an essential part of one of the main migration routes for birds in the world; within the region, it constitutes the Eastern Route which, together with the parallel Western Route and the Southern-Eilat Mountains Route, allow an estimated 500 million birds belonging 200 species to fly across Israel twice a year - in spring from here or from Africa towards their breeding places in Asia and Europe, and in autumn on the way back to their winter home in the Levant or in Africa.

The northern Jordan valley has two adjoining and complementary Important Bird Area (IBAs) recognised by BirdLife International, separated only by the political boundary of the Jordan River. The Jordanian (North Ghor) IBA on the eastern side covers some 6,000 ha, with the Israeli one covering 7,000 ha of the western side. Significant bird populations for which the IBAs were designated, including resident, wintering and passage migrant species, comprise the following: black francolins, marbled teals, black and white storks, black-crowned night herons, cattle and little egrets, collared and black-winged pratincoles, Egyptian vultures, European honey-buzzards, Levant sparrowhawks and Dead Sea sparrows.

== History, geopolitics, and events ==
=== Under the Ottoman Empire ===
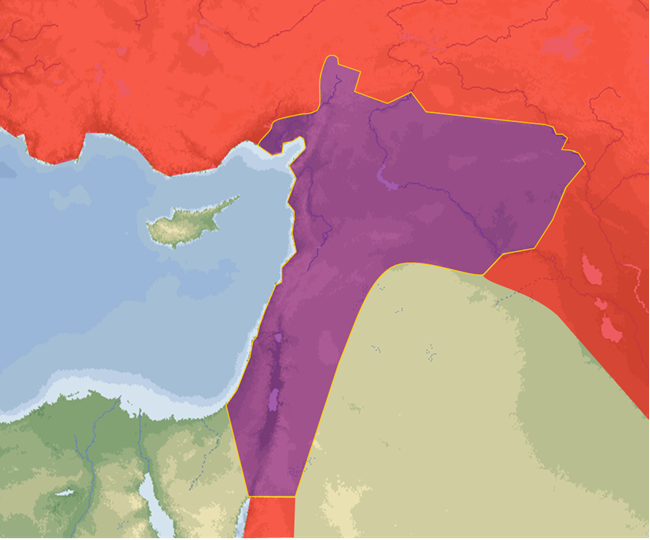
Approximation of the 'average' borders of Ottoman Syria

The Jordan valley was under control of the Ottoman Empire from their victory over the Mamluks in 1486, which involved a small battle in the valley en route to Khan Yunis and Egypt, until 1918. The Ottoman internal administrative divisions varied throughout the period with the Jordan river being at times a provincial border, and at times not. However the valley was contained within the group of provinces termed Ottoman Syria. Mutasarrifate of Jerusalem during some periods contained both banks of the Jordan, while during others the valley was bordered by Syria Vilayet and Beirut Vilayet.

According to the PEF Survey of Western Palestine, the people who lived in the Jordan Valley in the late 19th century were almost entirely Arabs of various tribes, save for a group of Armenian hermits on the Mount of Temptation and a group of Greek monks at Mar Saba. The explorers added that fellahin from the hills come to cultivate their land for them.

=== World War I ===
In 1916, Britain and France engaged in the Sykes–Picot Agreement in which the Ottoman territory of the Levant, which divided the yet undefeated Ottoman regions of the Levant between France and Britain. Under the agreement, the Jordan valley would be entirely within the British sphere of control.

In February 1918, as part of the wider Sinai and Palestine Campaign the British empire's Egyptian Expeditionary Force captured Jericho. Subsequently, during the British occupation of the Jordan Valley the Desert Mounted Corps were placed in the valley to protect the eastern flank of the British forces facing Ottoman forces in the hills of Moab. This position provided a strong position from which to launch the Battle of Megiddo which lead to the capture of Amman, Damascus, and the collapse of the Ottoman armies in the Levant.

=== Formation of Transjordan and Palestine ===
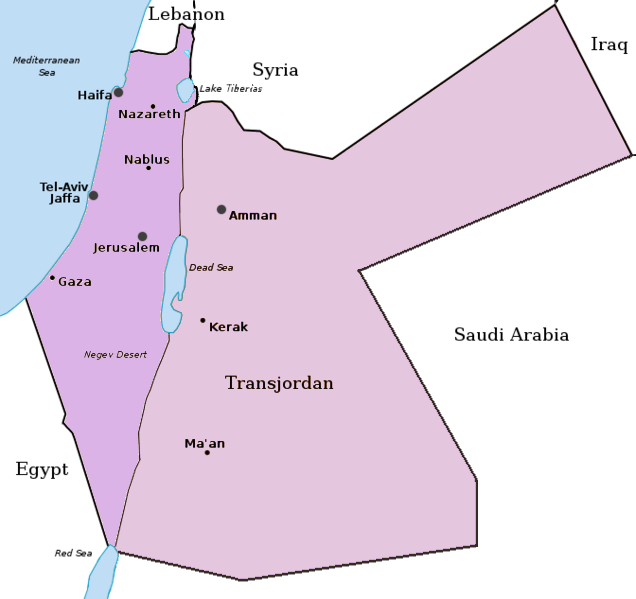
The Jordan valley divided between Mandatory Palestine & Emirate of Transjordan

Following conflicting promises and agreements during WWI, in particular McMahon–Hussein Correspondence and Balfour Declaration, as well as a power vacuum following the collapse of the Ottoman Empire led to a series of diplomatic conferences and treaties (Treaty of Sèvres, San Remo conference, Paulet–Newcombe Agreement) which convened with continued armed struggle between the great powers, their proxies, and Arab elements that were part of the Arab Revolt. Following the Battle of Maysalun the Transjordan area east of the valley become a no man's land and the British, who directly controlled the area west of the valley, chose to avoid any definite connection between the two areas. Following the Cairo Conference (1921) and meetings with Abdullah bin Hussein it was agreed that he would administer the territory east of the Jordan River, Emirate of Transjordan. The area west of the Jordan river was allocated in 1922 to the Mandatory Palestine under British Administration. The Jordan river, in the middle of the Jordan valley, was the border between these two entities. This agreement split the Jordan valley, which during Ottoman times was under a single administration, to two distinct entities.

Following the division, the concept of an east and west bank of the Jordan, as separate territorial units took hold. As a political example to this new reality, in 1929 Ze'ev Jabotinsky composed the political poem Two Banks to the Jordan which asserts that the Jordan river should be the central feature of Greater Israel, with the repeating refrain: "Two Banks has the Jordan/This is ours and, that is as well."

=== Naharayim power plant ===
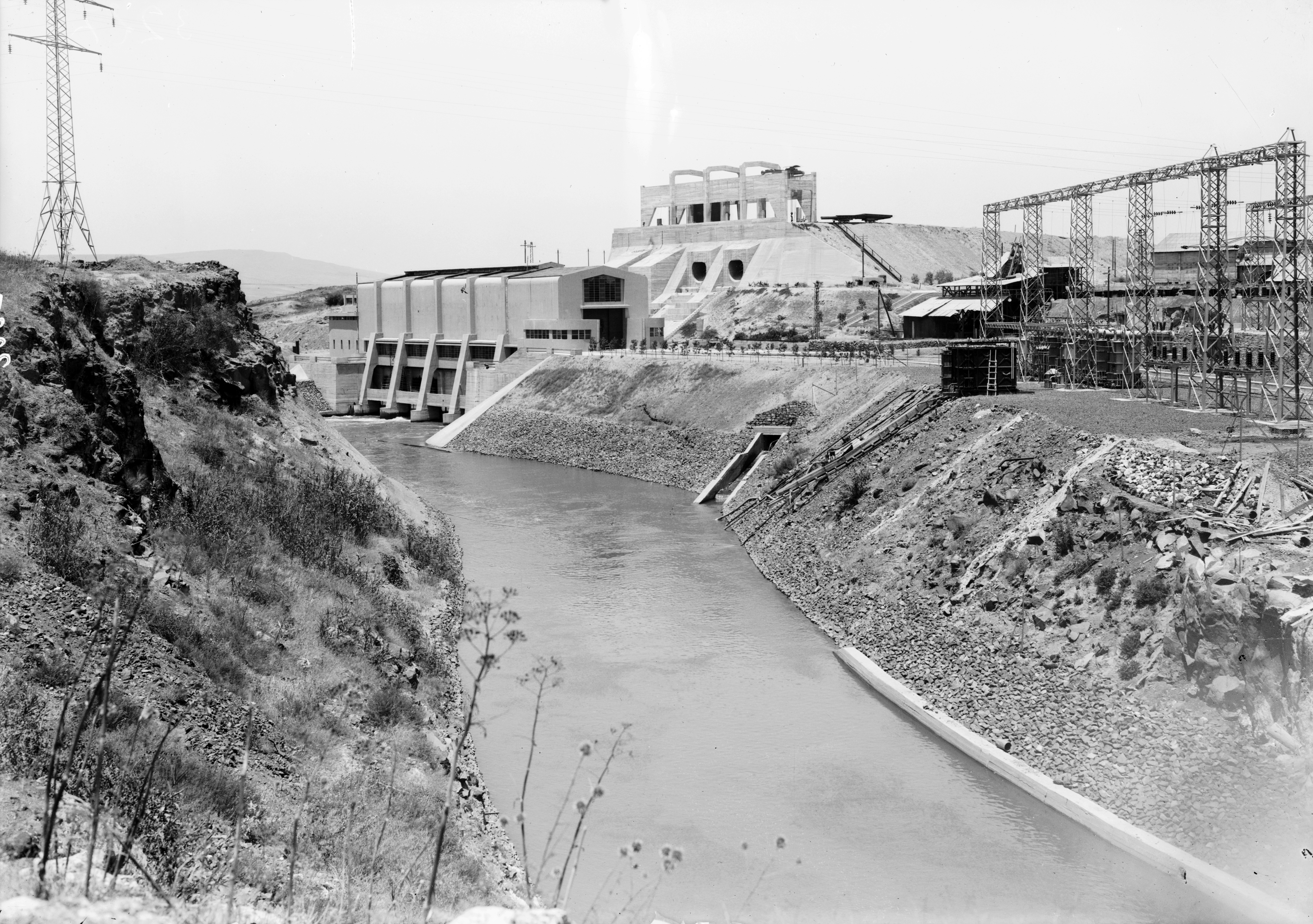
Rutenberg power plant, c. 1933

in 1926 Pinhas Rutenberg was granted a 70-year concession for the construction of hydroelectric plants along the Jordan River; the only plant built was the First Jordan Hydro-Electric Power House in the Jordan valley at the confluence of the Yarmouk River with the Jordan River near Naharayim. The Naharayim plant was a major source of electricity to the British Mandate and the Emirate of Transjordan. An adjacent company town, Tel Or, was founded in the vicinity of the power plant. The plant remained in operation until the war of 1948.

=== 1948 Arab–Israeli War ===
Boundaries defined in the 1947 UN Partition Plan for Palestine: Area assigned for a Jewish state Area assigned for an Arab state Planned Corpus separatum with the intention that Jerusalem would be neither Jewish nor Arab Armistice Demarcation Lines of 1949 (Green Line): Israel per 1949 armistice lines West Jerusalem and other areas under Israeli control from 1949 Gaza and the West Bank (including East Jerusalem) under Egyptian and Jordanian control till 1967

Under the 1947 United Nations Partition Plan for Palestine the northern portion of the western side of the valley would have been assigned to the Jewish state, and the southern portion to an Arab state. However hostilities between the Arabs and Jews commenced soon after the UN resolution as 1947–48 Civil War in Mandatory Palestine. The Jewish settlements in the Jordan valley were particularly disconnected from the rest of the Jewish Yishuv, were fairly small and dispersed among Arab settlements, and relied on a tenuous supply line via Nazareth. In March 1948 Haganah forces captured Samakh, Tiberias, located at the northern edge of the valley, the inhabitants fleeing to Nazareth. The Arab population of Tiberias (6,000 residents or 47.5% of the population) was evacuated under British military protection on 18 April 1948 following clashes in the mixed city. The Battle of Mishmar HaEmek in April 1948 a strategic settlement located on the route to the valley was successfully defended by Jewish forces, and Arab positions surrounding it were captured in a counter-attack. The Jewish supply route to the Jordan Valley and Galilee Panhandle was further secured by the Battle of Ramat Yohanan and a modus vivendi agreed with Druze in the Galilee. Subsequently, Operation Yiftach further opened up supply lines via Safed.

In the lead up to the full 1948 Arab–Israeli War, Naharayim, Tel-Or, and Gesher were shelled on 27–29 April 1948 by the Arab Legion. The power plant workers and their families without a Jordanian ID card evacuated into Mandatory Palestine. On 15 May 1948, the day hostilities formally commenced with Arab states, an Iraqi brigade invaded via Naharyim in an unsuccessful attempt to take Gesher. After the Tel Or village and the power plant were overrun by the Arab forces they were destroyed. To prevent Iraqi tanks from attacking Jewish villages in the Jordan Valley, the sluice gates of the Degania dam were opened. The rush of water, which deepened the Jordan river, was instrumental in blocking the Iraqi-Jordanian incursion. On 20 May 1948, after a failure to reach an agreement with Transjordan's King Abdullah, the southern Jordan valley Beit HaArava and the nearby north Dead sea Kalia were abandoned due to their isolation amidst Arab settlements. The residents and fighters of the villages evacuated via boat over the Dead Sea to the Israeli post at Sodom.

Concurrently, on 14 May Syrian forces began attacking via the Syrian-Mandate border in a series of engagement called Battles of the Kinarot Valley. The Syrians thrust down the eastern and southern Sea of Galilee shores, and attacked Samakh the neighboring Tegart fort and the settlements of Sha'ar HaGolan, Ein Gev, but they were bogged down by resistance. Later, they attacked Samakh using tanks and aircraft, and on 18 May they succeeded in conquering Samakh and occupied the abandoned Sha'ar HaGolan. On 21 May, the Syrian army was stopped at kibbutz Degania Alef, at the northern edge of the Jordan valley. where local militia reinforced by elements of the Carmeli Brigade halted Syrian armored forces with Molotov cocktails, hand grenades and a single PIAT. The remaining Syrian forces were driven off the next day by four Napoleonchik mountain guns. Following the Syrian forces' defeat at the Deganias a few days later, they abandoned the Samakh village. Following the heavy fighting, the Arab inhabitants of the city of Beit She'an in the northern valley fled across the Jordan River.

Following the first truce which ended on 8 July, the successful Israeli Operation Dekel captured by the time a second truce took effect at 19:00 18 July, the whole Lower Galilee from Haifa Bay to the Sea of Galilee was captured by Israel opening further supply lines to the settlements in the northern Jordan valley.

Throughout the entire war, Jordanian Arab Legion forces as well as Iraqi military forces crossed the Jordan valley to support the Arab effort in the central sector, the current West Bank.

From the beginning of the second truce on 18 July 1948 and until the end of hostilities with Jordan on 3 April 1949 and Syria on 20 July 1949 there were no further major military operations around the Jordan Valley, and contact lines remained static in this area. Unlike other areas, at the end of hostilities Israel controlled roughly the same territory of the Jordan Valley that it was allotted in the partition plan. Some Jewish settlements in the Jordanian controlled Jordan Valley were abandoned, while significantly more Arab residents fled mixed cities and Arab settlements as part of the 1948 Palestinian expulsion and flight.

In the aftermath of the war, a Palestinian Arab state was not formed in the West Bank, and the Jordanians retained control of both sides of the Jordan Valley along the West Bank – Jordan border due to the Jordanian rule of the West Bank.

=== Water wars 1953–1967 ===
National Water Carrier of Israel

The Jordan Valley Unified Water Plan, commonly known as the "Johnston Plan", was a plan for the unified water resource development of the Jordan Valley. It was negotiated and developed by US ambassador Eric Johnston between 1953 and 1955, and based on an earlier plan commissioned by United Nations Relief and Works Agency for Palestine Refugees in the Near East (UNRWA). Modeled upon the Tennessee Valley Authority's engineered development plan, it was approved by technical water committees of all the regional riparian countries—Israel, Jordan, Lebanon and Syria. Though the plan was rejected by the Arab League, both Israel and Jordan undertook to abide by their allocations under the plan. The US provided funding for Israel's National Water Carrier after receiving assurances from Israel that it would continue to abide by the plan's allocations. Similar funding was provided for Jordan's East Ghor Main Canal project after similar assurances were obtained from Jordan.

The Israeli National Water Carrier of Israel was completed in 1964, and coupled with increased closing of Degania Dam, greatly decreased the flow of water from the Sea of Galilee down to Jordan Valley.

The Jordanian East Ghor Main Canal was completed in stages between 1961 and 1966, and likewise diverts a significant amount of water from the Jordan river.

While providing benefits elsewhere by utilization of fresh water, the combined result of both of these projects and subsequent management and usage, was to greatly reduce the flow of water through the Jordan valley. The flow rate of the Jordan River once was 1.3 billion cubic meters per year; as of 2010, just 20 to 30 million cubic metres per year flow into the Dead Sea.

The Arab League which objected to Israeli National Water Carrier approved in 1964 the Headwater Diversion Plan (Jordan River) which would have diverted two of the three sources of the Jordan river. Israel's destruction, via airstrikes, of the diversion project in April 1967 was one of the events leading to the Six-Day War.

=== Six-Day War ===
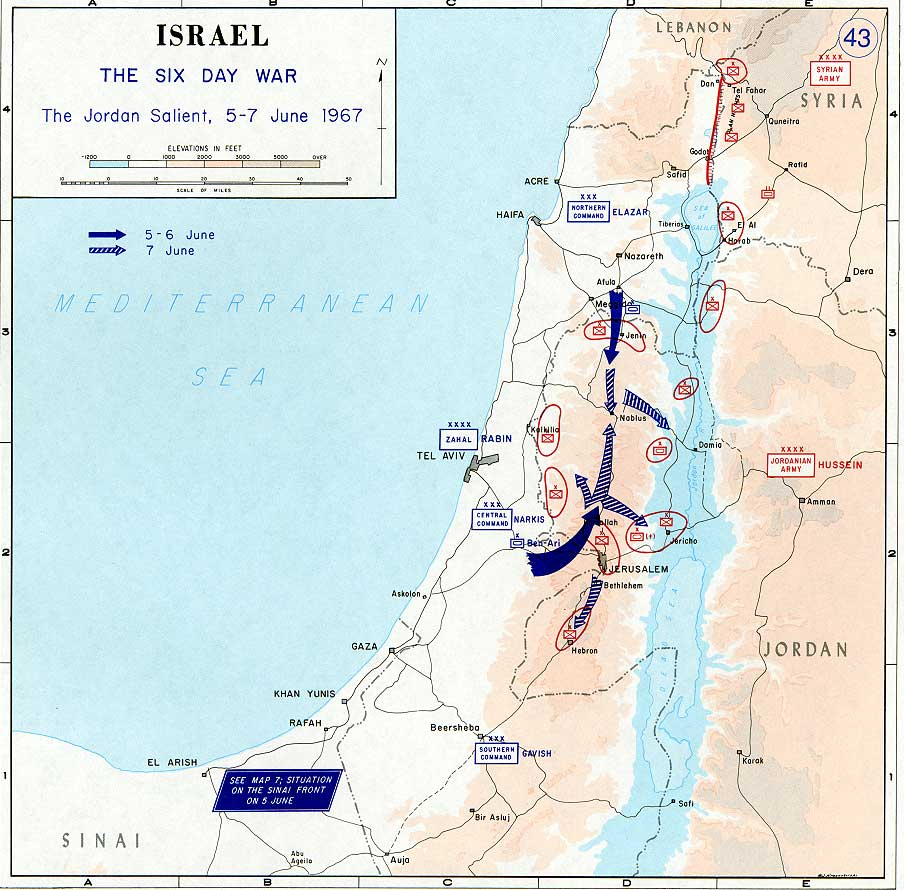
The Jordan salient, 5–7 June

Following commencement of hostilities of the Six-Day War on 5 June 1967, initial hostilities between Israel and Jordan were mainly around the line of contact between Israel and Jordan and around Jerusalem in particular. Following heavy fighting in Jerusalem, the city was captured on 7 June. The Israeli Harel Brigade advanced on the Jordan Valley and Israeli sappers blew up sections of the Allenby Bridge and King Abdullah Bridge in the south of the valley, and forces 36th Division blew up Damia Bridge located in the middle of the valley.

As it became clear that the Jordanian position, from the get-go a salient with limited supply routes from the other side of the Jordan river, was collapsing due to lack of suitable supply and reinforcement routes most of the remaining Jordanian units able to retreat did so, crossing the Jordan river to Jordan proper and the remaining West Bank cities were captured with little resistance by the Israelis. These retreating units, as well as two brigades that were held in reserve in the Jordan Valley, formed defensive positions on the Jordanian side of the Jordan valley and deeper in Jordanian territory. The Jordanian valley features, namely the river and the high and steep escarpments contributed to the strength of this position. Coupled with Israeli reluctance to cross the 1948 British Mandate border in this sector, American diplomatic pressure, and needs on additional fronts the war ended with the sides opposing one another across the Jordan Valley.

=== 1967 Palestinian exodus ===
During and following the Six-Day War, many Palestinians, who at the time had Jordanian citizenship, fled the West Bank to Jordan due to choice, fear, and in some cases being forced to do so. In the Jordan valley the majority of the inhabitants of Aqabat Jaber (30,000) and Ein as-Sultan (20,000) refugee camps fled. In al-Jiftlik over 800 homes were razed by the Israeli army and its 6,000 inhabitants were ordered to leave; most, however, returned to the village. The population of the Jordan Valley fled in disproportionate numbers compared to the rest of the West Bank. According to some estimates, the population of the Jericho sub-district which is in the Jordan Valley area decreased from around 79,407 in May 1967 to 10,800 in the September 1967 census or 83% compared to an estimate of 850,343 to 661,757 or 23% for the entire West Bank.

=== Jordan: conflict with PLO and Black September 1967–1971 ===
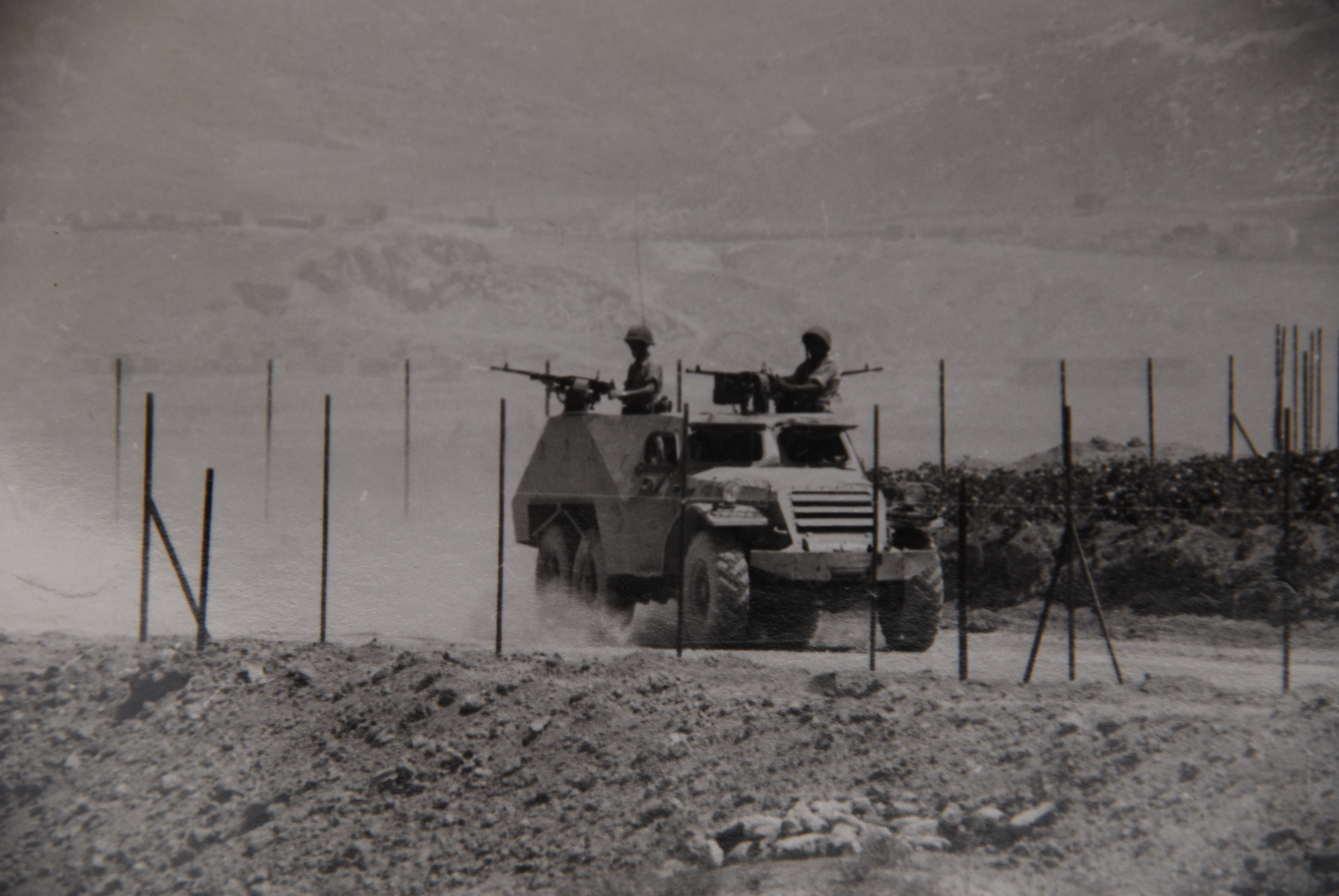
An Israeli military vehicle on patrol in the Jordan Valley, c. 1968

The proportion of Palestinians in Jordan of the total Jordanian was always high, and the 1967 refugees further increased their number.

After the Six-Day War in 1967, the PLO and Fatah stepped up their guerrilla attacks against Israel from Jordanian soil, using the Jordan Valley town of Karameh as their headquarters. The Israeli army attacked this base in March 1968 in the Battle of Karameh which ended in the destruction of the PLO base, deaths on both sides, destruction of property, and an Israeli withdrawal.

In Palestinian enclaves and refugee camps in Jordan, the Jordanian Police and army were losing their authority. Uniformed PLO militants openly carried weapons, set up checkpoints, and attempted to extort "taxes". During the November 1968 negotiations, a seven-point agreement was reached between King Hussein and Palestinian organizations.

This agreement, however, was not adhered to, and clashes grew between the Jordanian army and Palestinian militants. In February 1970 fighting broke out in Amman resulting in approximately 300 deaths. Between February and June 1970, about a thousand people died in Jordan due to the conflict. In September 1970; following failed assassination attempts of the king, and the Dawson's Field hijackings in which 4 planes were hijacked and landed at a desert airstrip in Jordan; the Jordanian king ordered the army to attack and expel Palestinian militants, and declared martial law. Syria attempted to aid the Palestinian cause in Jordan by sending significant military forces across the border, though nominally under the Palestine Liberation Army command, which were repulsed after some initial successes as a result of Jordanian air force strikes. After a protracted campaign, lasting 10 months, and claiming more than 3,400 Palestinian deaths the king reasserted Jordanian sovereignty. Yasser Arafat and remaining fighters fled to Southern Lebanon.

The effect of Black September on the Jordanian Jordan Valley population was severe as the valley had a relatively high fraction of Palestinian population and PLO bases and fighters. According to some estimates, half the buildings in the Jordanian side of the Jordan Valley were razed and the population decreased from 63,000 to 5,000.

=== 1973 Yom Kippur War ===
Even though Jordan was Western aligned, and was invaded by Syrian forces just three years prior, the Jordanian government decided to intervene in the 1973 conflict a week after the beginning of hostilities, sending an armoured division as an Expeditionary Force to southern Syria to aid in the defense of Damascus. However, declassified documents show this was a token participation to preserve King Hussein's status in the Arab world, and that some tacit understandings were made with Israel.

The Israeli-Jordanian contact line, the main portion being the Jordanian valley, remained quiet during the war. Israel and Jordan did however deploy units in a defensive posture on each side of the Jordan valley.

=== Post-1967 Israeli settlements and long-term views of the Jordan Valley ===
The 1968 Allon Plan: note blue Israeli zone along the Jordan valley

Since the end of the 1967 war, many Israeli governments have treated the western Jordan Valley as the eastern border of Israel with Jordan, intending to annex it or keep deployment of Israeli forces in the valley. An early example of this view was the Allon Plan formulated in 1967–1968. This Israeli position (which has also been held by the Yitzhak Rabin government that signed the Oslo Accords) stems from the narrowness of the Israeli coastal plain, the geographic defensive barrier created by the Jordan valley, and the demographic realities (lack of a significant Arab population in the valley that would impact the overall demographics of Israel).

Israel has constructed settlements in the West bank portion of the Jordan valley in three main phases:

1. 1967–1970: construction of five settlements along highway 90 which runs through the valley.
2. 1971–1974: construction of six settlements to the west of the road.
3. 1975–1999: construction of 18 additional settlements, which further reinforces the two settlement lines in the previous phases.

Two of the settlements, Kalya and Beit HaArava, were reestablished on the sites of settlements that were evacuated in the beginning of the 1948 war.

Concurrently, as it has done elsewhere, Israel has sought to settle migrant Bedouin pastoral communities, who roamed the arid plateau above the valley without regard to land ownership, into permanent communities particularly around the Jericho area. Israel has also enforced zoning rules, building permit requirements, natural reserves, and military firing zones in the territory which has restricted Arab development.

=== Oslo accords ===
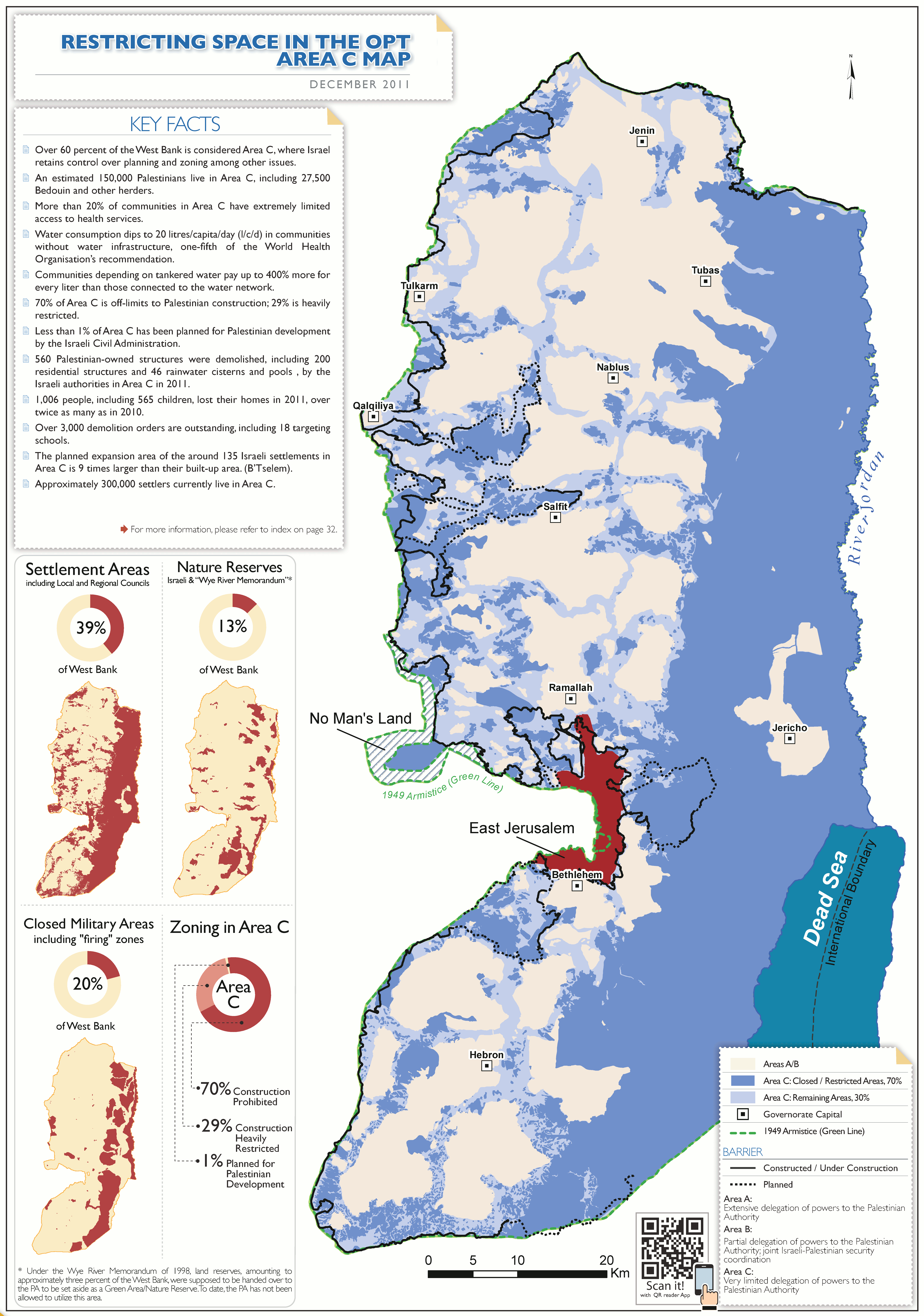
Area C in blue, note solid blue area-C strip along most of the Jordan river

Jericho, and the surrounding area in the southern valley, along with Gaza was the first territory handed over to the Palestinian National Authority, as a result of the Gaza–Jericho Agreement in 1994. Jericho, which is disconnected from the rest of the West Bank, and is far from the Israeli hinterland, was viewed as a suitable location for nascent Palestinian self-rule.

Subsequent agreements, in the Oslo Accords, handed over additional West Bank territories, however Israel has retained control as Area C administered by Israel, with the exception of an Area A enclave surrounding Jericho and very small Area B zones around some small Palestinian settlements.

In 1998, a $150 million casino-hotel was built in Jericho with the backing of Yasser Arafat. The casino closed subsequently during the Second Intifada.

=== 1994 Israeli-Jordanian peace agreement ===
In 1994, following the initial Oslo accords, Israel and Jordan signed a peace treaty. The agreement made minor land adjustments, in relation to existing ceasefire lines, to reflect both the shifting river course and historical claims, and also settled on-going water disputed and instituted a water sharing agreement.

The treaty defines the international border between the countries on the Jordan and Yarmouk Rivers in the center of those two river courses. In regard to the West Bank, Annex I (a) provides that "This line is the administrative boundary between Jordan and the territory which came under Israeli military government control in 1967. Any treatment of this line shall be without prejudice to the status of the territory."

=== 1997 Island of Peace massacre ===
The site of the former Naharayim power plant was dubbed Island of Peace, with Israeli private land ownership and property rights, but Jordanian sovereignty.

On 13 March 1997, a visiting group of schoolgirls was attacked by Jordanian Army Corporal Ahmed Daqamseh, who stated that he attacked because he was insulted and angered that the girls were whistling and clapping while he was praying. He killed seven schoolgirls, and injured six others.

On 16 March 1997, a few days after the attack, King Hussein of Jordan personally apologized for the incident, traveling to Israel to visit and pay respects to the grieving families of the seven murdered girls during the traditional Jewish mourning ceremony known as shiva. King Hussein's visit to the parents of the victims was broadcast live in Israel and Jordan. During the visit, in which King Hussein stood alongside Israeli Prime Minister Benjamin Netanyahu, he expressed an apology on behalf of the Kingdom of Jordan telling the parents: "a crime that is a shame for all of us. I feel as if I have lost a child of my own. If there is any purpose in life it will be to make sure that all the children no longer suffer the way our generation did."

The perpetrator, however, was diagnosed with antisocial personality disorder by a Jordanian medical team. Therefore, a five-member military tribunal sentenced him to only 20 years in prison. Daqamseh expressed pride for his actions, and he was later called a "hero" by Jordanian politician Hussein Mjalli. A petition circulated in the Jordanian parliament in 2013 in which MPs alleged that he had finished his sentence. He was released on 12 March 2017 after he finished his sentence.

=== 2000–2006 Second Intifada ===
Despite some clashes in the Jericho area during the Second Intifada, it was not a major area of operations by either side. The Jericho casino was shut shortly after the beginning of the Intifada, and has not since returned to business.

On 14 March 2006, Israel raided the Palestinian jail in Jericho as part of Operation Bringing Home the Goods to capture the killers of Israeli minister Rehavam Ze'evi who were jailed there, following the announcement of the Hamas elected government that the prisoners would be released and the leaving of international wardens who were monitoring the incarceration. The prisoners put up a fight, and after a ten-hour siege, the prisoners surrendered and were arrested. A series of riots and kidnapping of foreigners ensued throughout the Palestinian territories. Reports from the scene said 50 jeeps, three tanks, and an armored bulldozer pushed into Jericho, and two helicopters were flying overhead.

=== Future of the West Bank portion of the Jordan Valley ===
September 2019 annexation proposal by Israeli prime minister Benjamin Netanyahu Jordan Valley area to be annexed by Israel Rest of the West Bank, including Jericho

Following the end of the Second Intifada, the Palestinian government has attempted to gain control over additional areas and in particular the area C section of the Jordan valley and the north Dead Sea. The long-standing Palestinian view is and has been that the entire West Bank, including the Jordan Valley, should be Palestinian.

Israeli enforcement of zoning rules, building permits, natural reserves, and firing zones in the Jordan valley, the adjoining area east of Jerusalem, the south Hebron hills and elsewhere, have become an issue covered by activists and human-rights organizations. B'Tselem sees the actions by the Israeli government as a part of a policy aimed at de facto annexing the Jordan Valley. The Bedouin, who erect structures illegally per the Israeli view, have received material aid from the Red Cross, the European Union, and the UN OCHA. Some settler groups have claimed that the EU's ambassador is working to "establish a terror state", with housing aid to Bedouin along strategic routes.

On 10 September 2019, Israeli Prime Minister Netanyahu said that the government would annex the Jordan Valley by applying "Israeli sovereignty over the Jordan Valley and northern Dead Sea" should he continue being Prime Minister after the September 2019 Israeli legislative election.

In late March 2024, Israel's far-right Finance Minister Bezalel Smotrich declared that the Israeli government had newly seized 10 km^{2} of land in the West Bank; this included parts of the Jordan Valley, as well as land between the Israeli settlements Ma'ale Adumim and Kedar.

== The Israeli Jordan Valley Regional Council ==
In the context of pre-state Zionist and later Israeli settlement, "Jordan Valley" means the southern tip of the Sea of Galilee and the first kilometres of the valley towards Beit She'an.

In the late 1930s, the kibbutzim in the Jordan Valley formed the Council of the Gush, a regional municipal framework responsible for liaison with the authorities of the British Mandate. In the 1940s, this economic, cultural, and security cooperation between the kibbutzim continued, and a regional school system was established. In 1949, the Jordan Valley Regional Council was formed, becoming the model for regional councils throughout Israel. It is called Emek HaYarden Regional Council, and is different from the Bik'at HaYarden Regional Council (same translation), which consists of Israeli settlements built after 1967. The Bik'at HaYarden settlements are located in the West Bank between the pre-1967 borders and Jericho in the south. Settlements near the Dead Sea are part of the Megilot Regional Council.

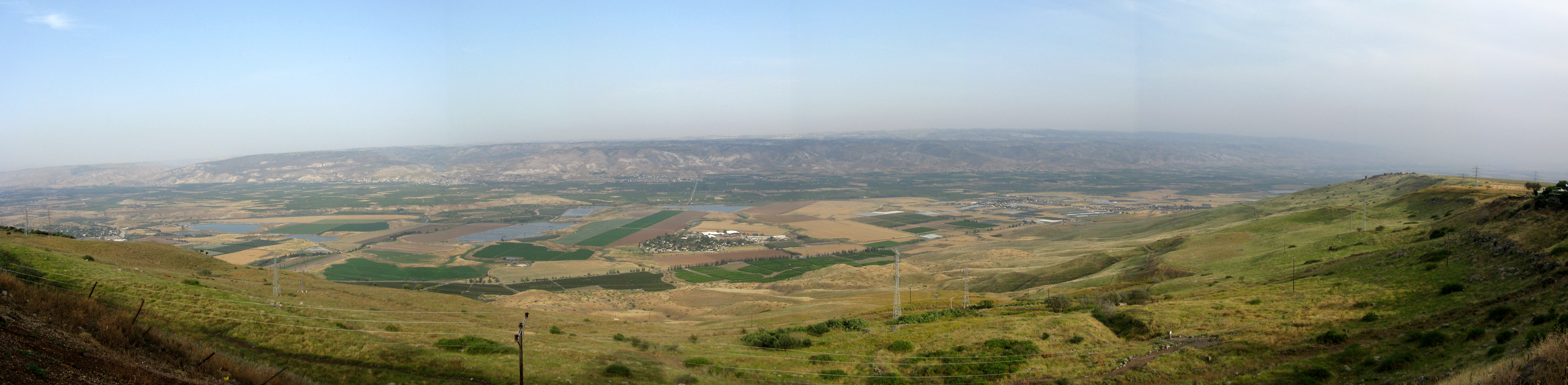
Panorama of Jordan Valley

== Agriculture ==
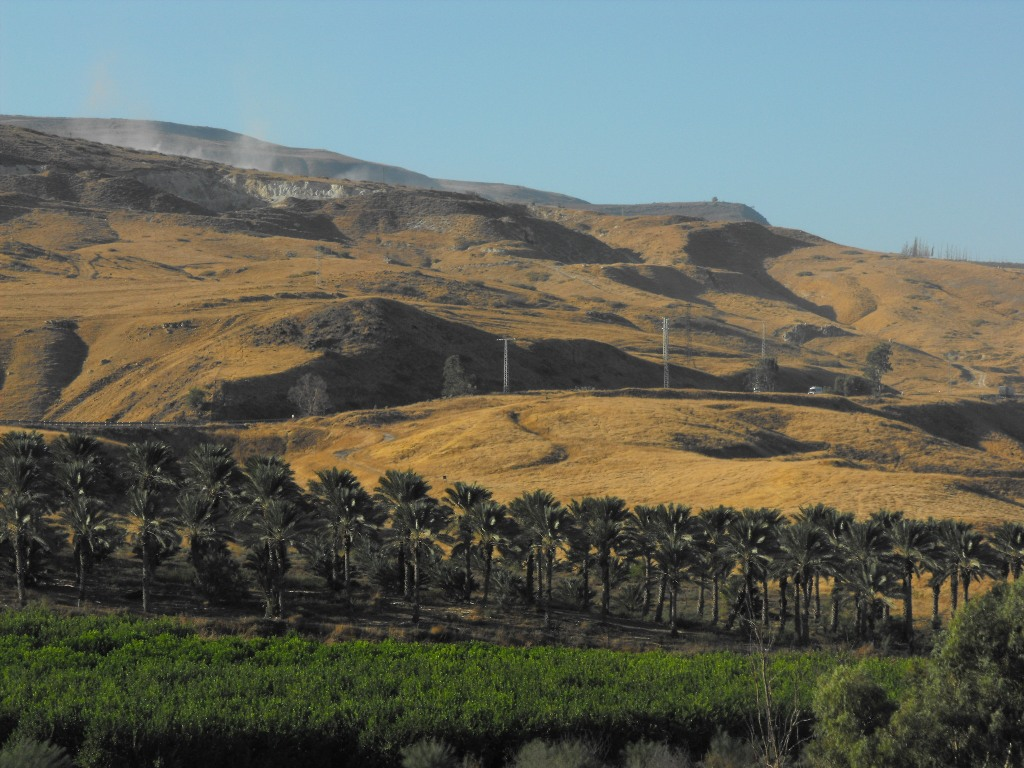
Date palms of kibbutz Gesher, Jordan Valley

The Jordan Valley is several degrees warmer than adjacent areas, and its year-round agricultural climate, fertile soils and water supply made it a site for agriculture dating to about 10,000 years ago. By about 3000 BCE, produce from the valley was being exported to neighboring regions.

The area's fertile lands were chronicled in the Old Testament. Modern methods of farming have vastly expanded the agricultural output of the area. The construction of the East Ghor Canal by Jordan in the 1950s (now known as the King Abdullah Canal), which runs down the east bank of the Jordan Valley for 69 kilometers, has brought new areas under irrigation. The introduction of portable greenhouses has brought about a sevenfold increase in productivity, allowing Jordan to export large amounts of fruit and vegetables year-round.

According to Gideon Levy, authorities do not allow many Palestinian herding and agricultural communities access to the water or electricity grids, and tear down olive groves, donated solar panels, access roads to fields and waterlines which lack an Israeli warrant. Often the reason given concerns the 'protection of antiquities'. According to agricultural consultant Samir Muaddi, the Civil Administration helps Palestinian farmers and the Palestinian agriculture ministry market their produce in Israel and ensure its quality. Seminars are held on modern agriculture, exposing the farmers to Israeli and international innovations.

The Jordan River rises from several sources, mainly the Anti-Lebanon Mountains in Syria. It flows down into the Sea of Galilee, 212 meters below sea level, and then drains into the Dead Sea. South of the Dead Sea, the Jordan Valley turns into the hot, dry Arabah valley.

== Religious significance ==
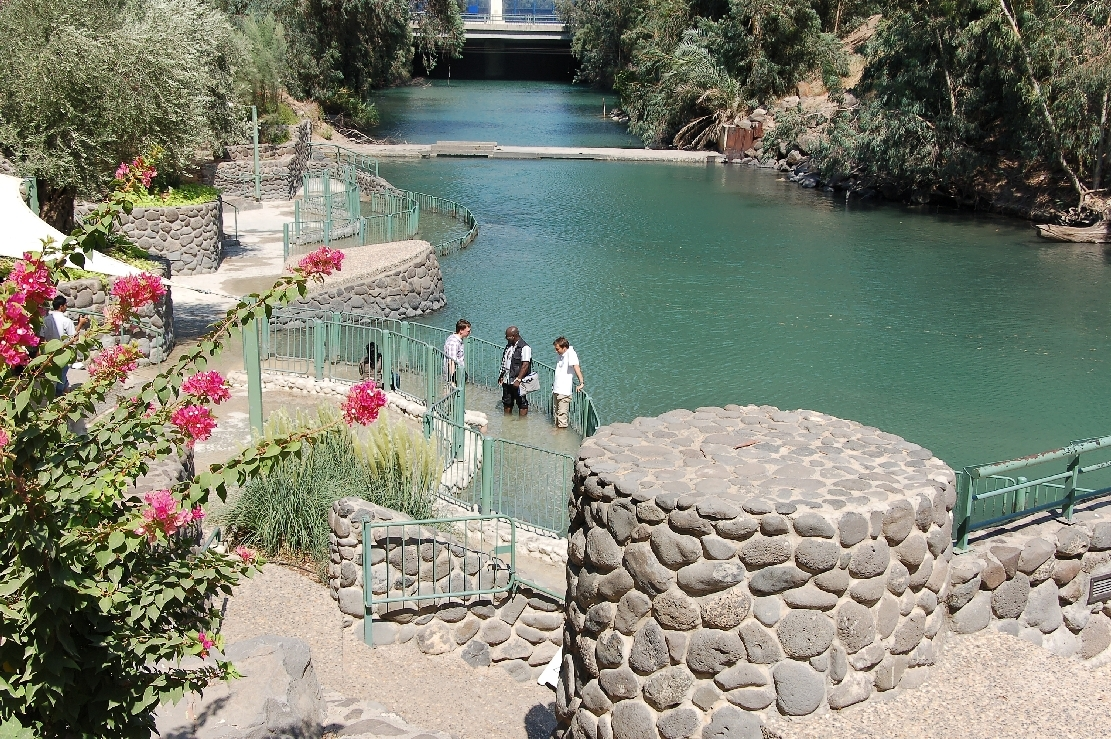
Yardenit baptism site on the Jordan River

The area's fertile lands were chronicled in the Hebrew Bible. Lot chose to settle in the Jordan Valley when he separated from Abram (later Abraham), and the valley was the site of several miracles for the people of Israel, such as when the Jordan River stopped its flow to allow the Israelites, led by Joshua, to cross its riverbed at Gilgal, which went dry as soon as the Ark of the Covenant reached the shore.

Yom HaAliyah (Aliyah Day, Hebrew: יום העלייה) is an Israeli national holiday celebrated annually on the tenth of the Hebrew month of Nisan to commemorate the Israelites crossing the Jordan River into the Land of Israel while carrying the Ark of the Covenant.

The Jordan River is revered by Christians as the place where John the Baptist baptized Jesus.

== Pilgrimage and tourism ==
Jesus' traditional baptism site has attracted pilgrims throughout history. During the last four decades pilgrimage facilities have been created at three different sites. With Al Maghtas Jordan has the historically oldest site, with archaeological finds from the earliest periods of Christian worship. Across the river, on the West Bank side, Qasr el Yahud has its own medieval traditions. Both sites were off-limits between 1967 and the 2000s, first due to the conflict between Israel and Jordan and then due to the Palestinian First and Second Intifadas, but have been reopened in 2000 and 2010–2011 respectively. A new alternative site was opened in 1981 further up north on the Israeli side, at Yardenit.

== See also ==
- Ancient underground quarry, Jordan Valley, possibly associated by the Byzantines with Gilgal and the "twelve stones"
- Gilgal, site in the Jordan Valley mentioned in the Hebrew Bible
- Jericho, modern and ancient town in the Jordan Valley
