= Uzi Narkiss =

Israeli general

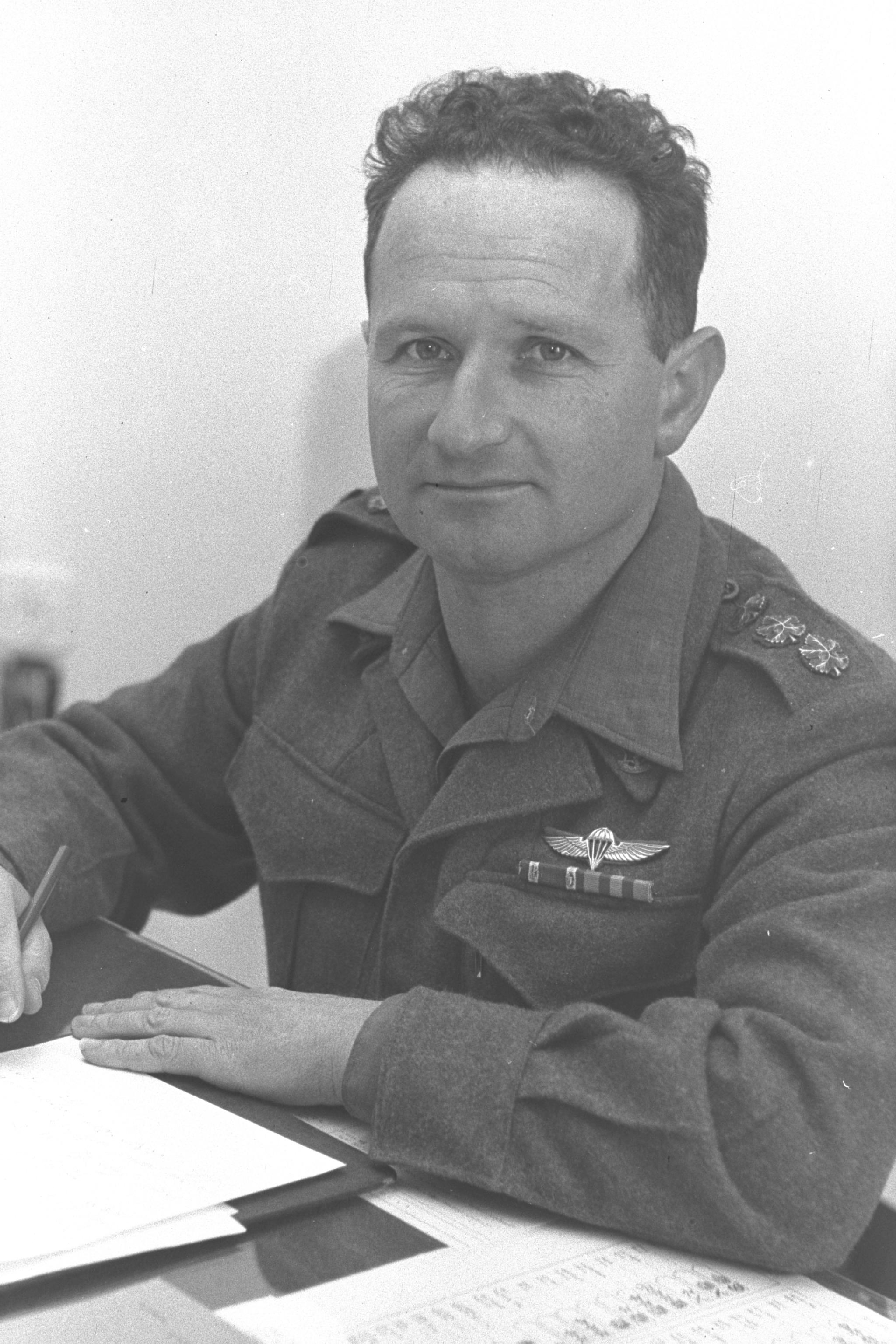
- Narkiss in 1959
- Native name: עוזי נרקיס
- Born: January 6, 1925; Jerusalem, Mandatory Palestine
- Died: December 17, 1997 (Aged 72) Jerusalem, Israel
- Buried: Jerusalem, Israel (Mount Herzl)
- Allegiance: Palmach, Israel
- Awards: War of Independence Ribbon; Sinai War Ribbon; Six-Day War Ribbon; Legion of Honour

Uzi Narkiss (Hebrew: עוזי נרקיס; January 6, 1925 – December 17, 1997) was an Israeli general. Narkiss was commander of the Israel Defense Forces (IDF) units in the Central Region during the 1967 Six-Day War. Narkiss appears in the famous photograph of Defense Minister Moshe Dayan flanked by Chief of Staff Yitzhak Rabin taken in the Old City of Jerusalem shortly after its capture from Jordanian forces.

== Early life ==
Uzi Narkiss was born in Jerusalem to Polish Jewish parents. His first memory was of going into hiding during the 1929 Palestine riots. Narkiss attended high school at Gymnasia Rehavia. He joined the Palmach at the age of 16 and was involved in Haganah operations against British Mandatory forces in Palestine.

== Military career ==
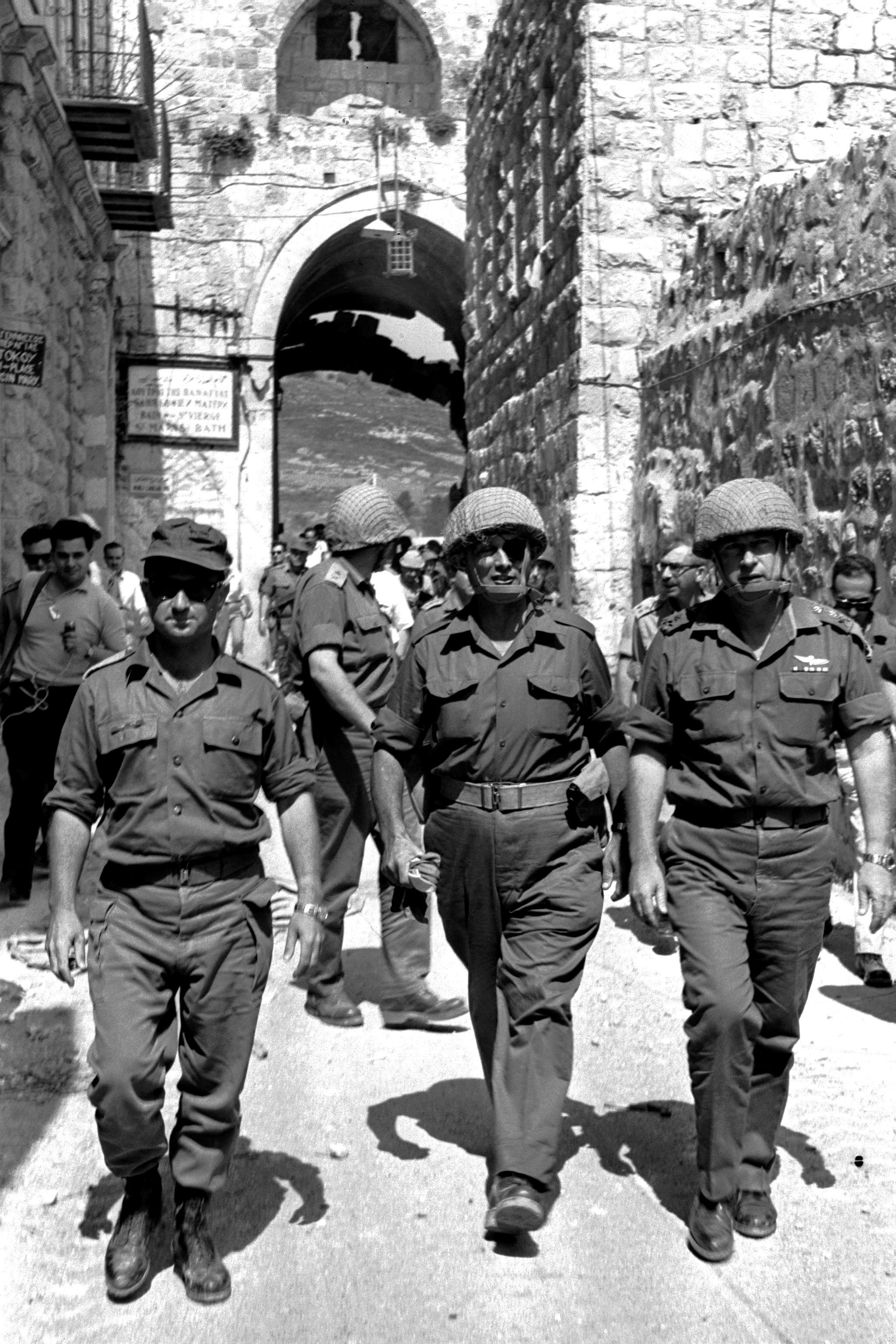
Gen. Uzi Narkiss, Defense Minister Moshe Dayan and Chief of staff Yitzhak Rabin in the Old City of Jerusalem during the Six-Day War

In April 1948, Narkiss headed the assault on Katamon with the Fourth Battalion of the Harel Brigade, during which time they captured the monastery at San Simon — a key strategic position. Following the final departure of the British in May 1948 and the Israeli Declaration of Independence, Narkiss was appointed to assist those besieged in the Jewish Quarter of the Old City. Narkiss' unit, dubbed a "diversionary force," succeeded in penetrating Zion Gate, bringing in supplies and evacuating the wounded from those under siege. When military reinforcements failed to appear, however, Narkiss ordered his men to retreat, with the Old City falling to Jordanian forces shortly thereafter.

Narkiss spent several years studying in France at the École de Guerre (the French Military Academy). He later served as an Israeli military attaché and was awarded the Légion d’honneur by the French government. In 1965, he was appointed the first director of the Israel National Defense College.

During the Six-Day War on June 5, 1967, with seven brigades under his command known as Central Command, Narkiss was responsible for combating any possible Jordanian offensive. Capturing the Old City was not part of the plan. Israel Defense Forces (IDF) units moved effectively to take key positions in east Jerusalem, where one key location was Ammunition Hill. Still, to Narkiss' dismay, the politicians would still not allow the Old City to be taken. But with a looming cease fire approaching after an emergency meeting of the UN, Moshe Dayan gave the order to Narkiss who quickly capitalised on the opportunity to capture the city before any cease fire prevented this as an option. Under his direction, the Old City was captured on June 7 and Jerusalem was reunified under Israeli control. From Narkiss' viewpoint, this completed the campaign he had begun 19 years earlier, and whose previous failure had haunted him.

After the war, the Palestinian village of Beit Awwa was completely destroyed. Moshe Dayan claimed the destruction was carried out under the orders of an officer who wished to expel the residents; Brigadier General Uzi Narkiss claimed the credit for the action.

== Later activities ==
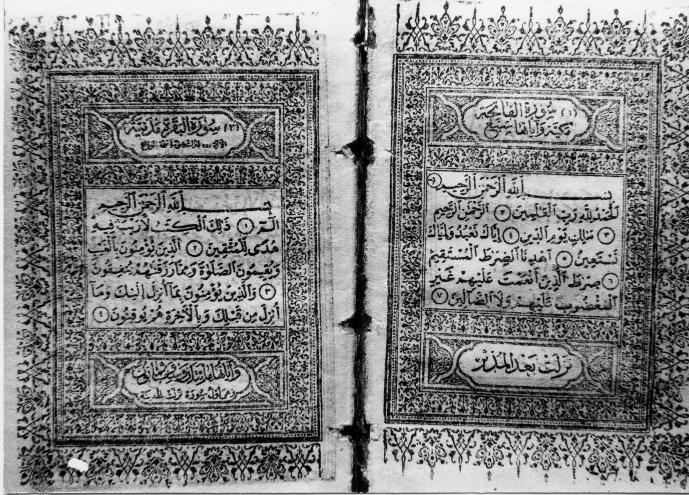
Pages from the Quran taken from Abdul Kader al-Husseini's body by Uzi Narkiss

In response to ongoing fedayeen attacks across the Jordan River in early 1968, the IDF performed dual military operations in March: Operation Asuta, as part of Southern Command operations; and Operation Inferno, as part Narkiss's Central Command. While the IDF considered the former an operational success, the latter resulted in the Battle of Karameh, which obtained mixed results. While Operation Inferno achieved most of its objectives, namely uprooting Fatah from their headquarters at Karameh in Jordan, it failed to capture Yasser Arafat. Moreover, the Israelis suffered numerous casualties and loss of equipment, some of which was paraded through Amman. This emboldened King Hussein, and led to a recruitment wave in Fatah. As a result, Narkiss was quietly relieved of his command, and instead went on to hold key positions in the Jewish Agency and the World Zionist Organization.

In 1948, Uzi Narkiss searched the body of the dead Palestinian commander Abdul Kader Husseini for his Koran on the battlefield. In the 1980s he wanted to give it to Kader's son Faisal Husseini but only "in the presence of journalists and TV cameras – otherwise I am not interested". Husseini was not interested under such terms, therefore Narkiss kept it in his library.

== Death ==
Narkiss died in 1997 after a long illness at the age of 72. He was buried in the military cemetery on Mount Herzl.
