= Battle of Karameh =

1968 battle during the War of Attrition

- Part of the War of Attrition and the Israeli–Palestinian conflict
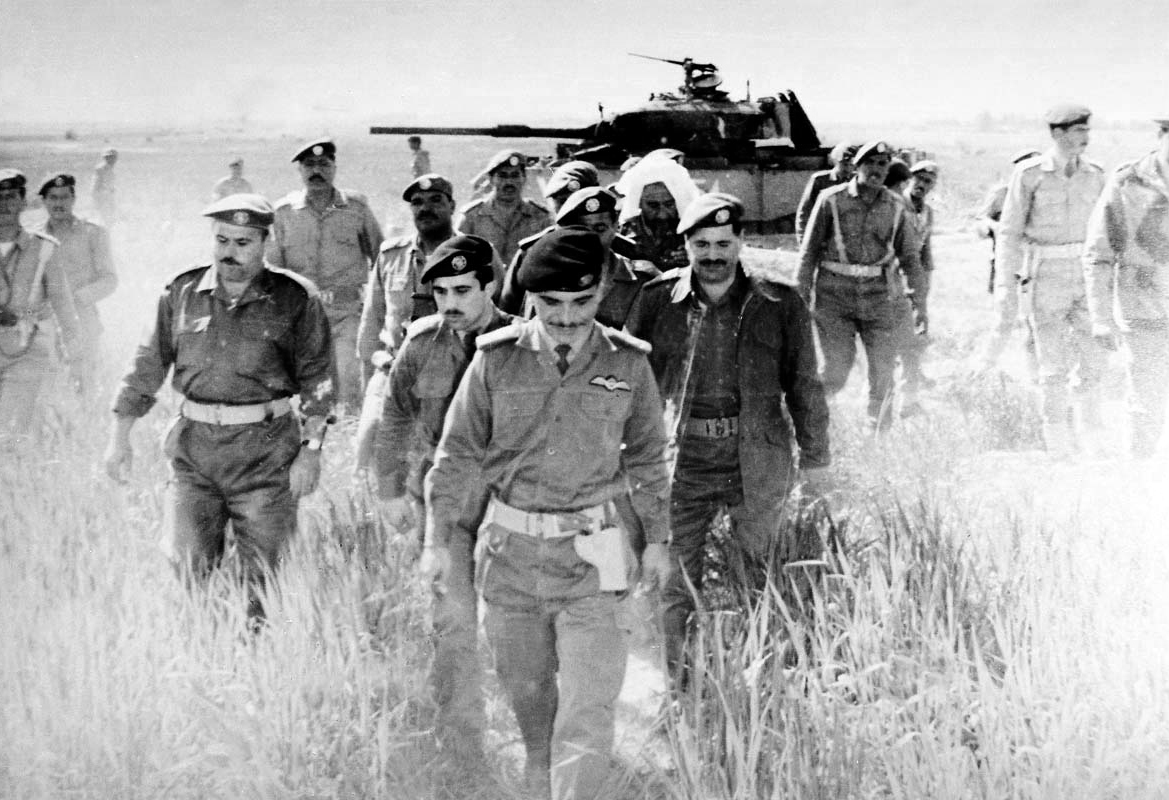
- King Hussein after checking an abandoned Israeli Centurion tank
Date	21 March 1968
Location	Karameh, Jordan 31°57′00″N 35°34′48″E
Result	Both sides claim victory: Destruction of Karameh camp; Israel fails to capture Yasser Arafat; Israeli withdrawal from Karameh; repulsed in other axes

Belligerents
Israel	Jordan; Palestine Liberation Organization; Fatah; PLA

Commanders and leaders
Levi Eshkol; Uzi Narkiss; Moshe Dayan; Haim Bar-Lev; Israel Tal; Shmuel Gonen; Danny Matt; Rafael Eitan	(Jordan) King Hussein (Jordan) Amer Khammash (Jordan) Mashour Haditha (Jordan) Asad Ghanma (Palestine Liberation Organization) Yasser Arafat (Palestine Liberation Organization) Abu Iyad (Palestine Liberation Organization) Abu Jihad (Palestine Liberation Organization) Abu Ali Iyad

Strength
(Israel) About 15,000; 47 tanks (1 armored brigade 1 infantry brigade 1 paratroop battalion 1 engineering battalion 5 artillery battalions)	(Jordan) 2nd armored division (10 artillery batteries 4 brigades 1 Patton tank battalion) (Palestine Liberation Organization) 900–1000 fighters

Casualties and losses
Israel: 28– 33 dead 69 – 161 wounded 27 tanks damaged, 4 left behind 2 APCs; 2 vehicles 1 aircraft	Jordan: 40–84 dead 108– 250 wounded 4 captured 28 tanks damaged, 2 captured PLO: 156 dead ~100 wounded 141 captured
- 175 buildings destroyed

The Battle of Karameh (Arabic: معركة الكرامة) was a 15-hour military engagement between Israel and the combined forces of Jordan and the Palestine Liberation Organization (PLO) in the Jordanian border town of Karameh during the War of Attrition on 21 March 1968. It was planned by Israel as one of two concurrent raids on PLO camps, one in Karameh along the Jordan River and the other in the distant village of Ghor es-Safi south of the Dead Sea.

After Israel occupied the West Bank in 1967, Palestinian fighters, also known as fedayeen, moved to Jordan and stepped up their attacks on Israel and the occupied territories, basing themselves in Karameh. Israel stated that it aimed to destroy fedayeen camps at Karameh, and to capture the leader of the PLO Yasser Arafat as reprisal. Israel also wanted to punish Jordan for its perceived support to the fedayeen. A large Israeli force launched an attack on the town on the dawn of 21 March, supported by fighter jets. Israel assumed the Jordanian Army would choose to not get involved in the battle, but the latter deployed heavy artillery fire, while the Palestinian irregulars engaged in guerrilla warfare. The Israelis withdrew, or were repulsed, after a day-long battle.

Both sides declared victory. On a tactical level, Israel managed to destroy most of the Karameh camp and take around a hundred PLO fighters as prisoners. On a political level, Jordan and the PLO inflicted relatively high casualties on the Israelis, who left behind three dead soldiers in Karameh along with several damaged Israeli vehicles and tanks, which were later paraded in Amman by the Jordanian Army. The engagement also marked the first known deployment of suicide bombers by Palestinian fighters, and the issuance of the United Nations Security Council Resolution 248, which unanimously condemned Israel for violating the cease-fire line and its disproportionate use of force.

The battle gained wide acclaim and recognition in the Arab world, and the following period witnessed an upsurge of support from Arab countries to the fedayeen in Jordan. The Palestinians had limited success in inflicting Israeli casualties, but King Hussein allowed them to take credit, to the point of proclaiming "we are all fedayeen". As the PLO's strength began to grow in the aftermath, the fedayeen began to speak openly of overthrowing the Hashemite monarchy, and the ensuing tensions with the Jordanian authorities eventually precipitated in their expulsion to Lebanon in 1971, marking the end of the Black September conflict.

== Background ==
Palestinian groups used to initiate few attacks on Israeli targets from both the West Bank and Jordan before the Six-Day War, some of which caused Israel to retaliate which became known as the Reprisal operations. Following the seizure of the West Bank from Jordan in the June 1967 Six-Day War, Israel destroyed the existing Palestinian group Fatah networks there. In early 1968, however, Fatah guerrillas began raiding Israel from bases on the Jordanian side of the river. Most of these attacks were blocked by the Israel Defense Forces. At times, Jordanian Army infantry and artillery units gave the Fatah squads covering fire, leading to frequent direct skirmishes between the Israeli and the Jordanian militaries. On 14–15 February, Jordanian mortars hit several Israeli settlements in the Beit Shean Valley and Jordan Valley. Israeli artillery and air forces retaliated against Jordanian bases and artillery batteries, as well as the American-financed East Ghor Canal (now known as the King Abdullah Canal). As a result, thousands of Jordanian farmers fled eastwards, and fedayeen (agents willing to sacrifice themselves for the Palestinian cause) moved into the valley. An American-sponsored ceasefire was arranged, and King Hussein declared he would prevent these groups from using Jordan as a base for attack.

In February, King Hussein sent twenty carloads of troops and police to order a Fatah unit to leave the town of Karameh. When it arrived, the column found itself surrounded by men wielding machine guns; their commander said "You have three minutes to decide whether you leave or die". They withdrew. By March, several hundred civilians lived in the camp, along with about 900 guerrillas, mostly from Fatah, and PLO leader Yasser Arafat, who had his headquarters there.

In Israel, Chief of the Military Intelligence Directorate Aharon Yariv stated that a raid would damage Fatah's prestige. On the other hand, Israeli Foreign Minister Abba Eban and his chief of bureau Gideon Rafael — mindful of an adverse American reaction due to the good relationship between Jordan and the US — worried a raid could result in innocent civilian deaths and be a political disservice to Israel. Chief of Staff Haim Bar-Lev promised a "clean action". Israeli Defense Minister Moshe Dayan asked for a "principal approval" for a raid, but this was denied by the cabinet. On 13 December, Operation Karameh was scheduled for the next night, it was placed in the hands of both Brigade 35 of the Paratroop Corps and the Sayeret Matkal special-operations force. The operation was called off, rescheduled for 12 March and then called off again. Dayan warned the other ministers that a bus might strike a mine. On 18 March, an Israeli school bus was blown up by a mine near Be'er Ora in the Arava, killing two adults and wounding ten children. This was the 38th Fatah operation in little more than three months. That night, the cabinet approved the attack. The U.S. tried to prevent it by forwarding Israel a message from King Hussein. Israeli Prime Minister Levi Eshkol called in the cabinet for further counseling; only the National Religious Party leader Haim-Moshe Shapira vocally opposed the attack, while Education Minister Zalman Aran opposed it too but remained silent. There was an intelligence informant who was a former Fatah member, code-named "Grotius" who was said to be familiar with the base in Karameh and its surroundings. Grotius is said to have arrived in Jordan as a member of the 421st Commando Battalion of the Palestine Liberation Army, on the eve of the Six-Day War. After deserting his battalion, he trained in Syria at the Hama camp and later slipped into the West Bank. Israel assumed that the Jordanians would ignore the invasion, however, the Israelis were met with heavy resistance from them.

== Prelude ==
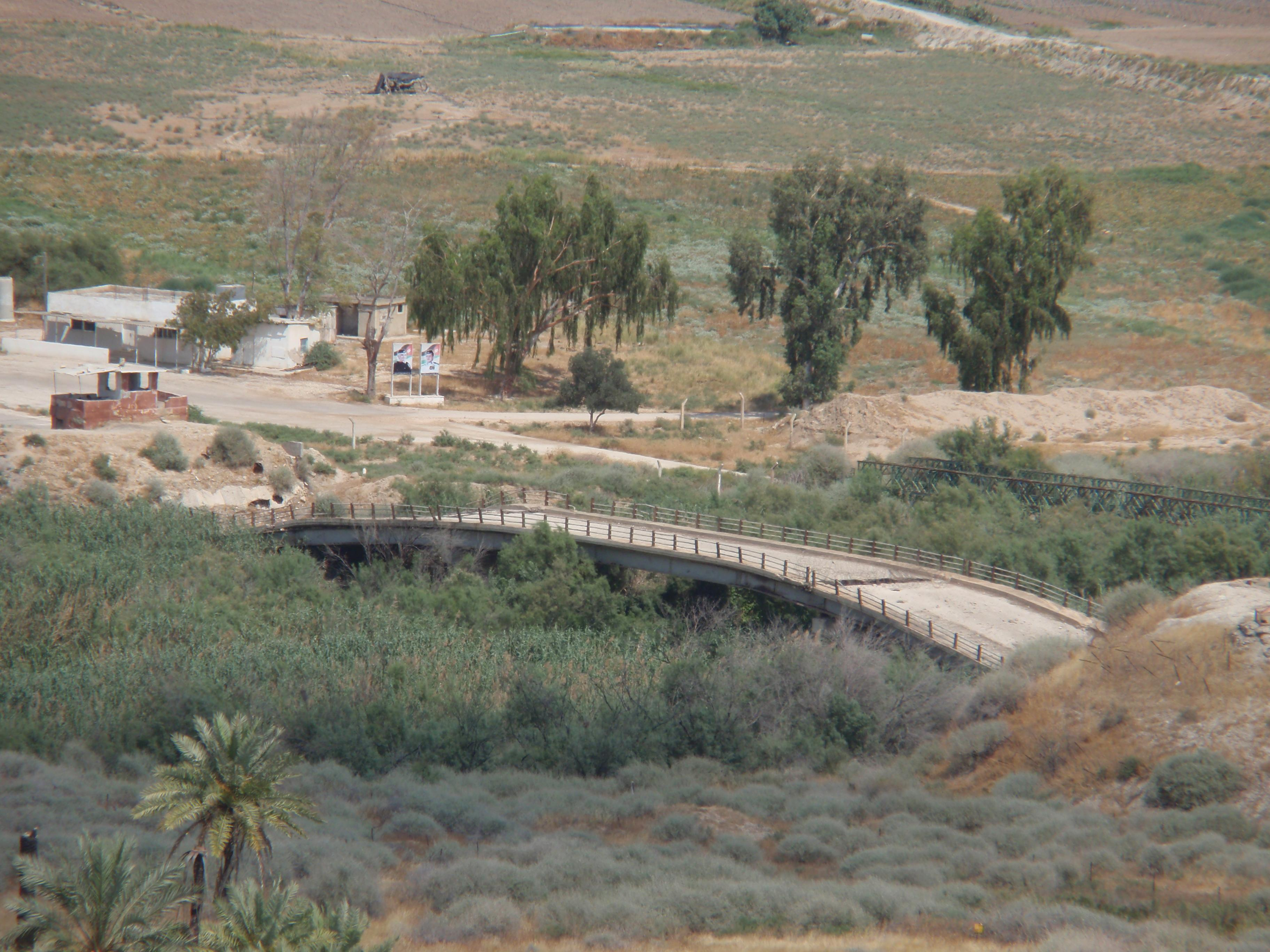
View of Damia Bridge

On 4 March, Jordanian intelligence began to detect Israeli activity near the border, as Israeli troops began to concentrate near the Allenby Bridge (known now as King Hussein Bridge) and Damia Bridge (known now as Adam Bridge). Jordan ordered the 1st Infantry Division to take up positions near those bridges and around Karameh. On 17 March, Dayan warned that the fedayeen were preparing for a "new wave of terror", which Israel would take steps to contain if King Hussein of Jordan could not. Eshkol repeated that message to the Knesset, and on the same day, Israeli Ambassador Yosef Tekoah filed two complaints with the United Nations against what he termed "the Arabs' repeated acts of aggression."

By 20 March, Jordan had identified parts of the Israeli 7th Armored Brigade, 60th Armored Brigade, 35th Paratroop Brigade, 80th Infantry Brigade, a combat engineer battalion and five artillery battalions between Allenby and Damia bridges. The Jordanians assumed the Israelis were planning an attack with a drive on Amman, and the army took up positions near the bridges, with the 60th Armored Brigade joining the 1st Infantry Division. Jordan also added most of its armored car, antitank and artillery units to the 1st Infantry Division. The total firepower was 105 Patton tanks and 88 artillery pieces. The infantry divisions were deployed near the bridges, each with a tank company. The artillery was mostly deployed on the higher Jordan Valley ridges overlooking Karameh for topological advantage.

The Israeli forces amounted to less than a brigade of armor, an infantry brigade, a paratroop battalion, an engineering battalion and five battalions of artillery. The units were divided into four task forces. The largest of these was to cross the Allenby Bridge and reach Karameh from the south; a second one was to cross the Damia Bridge, and reach Karameh from the north, thus completing a pincer move. Meanwhile, paratroopers were to be lifted by helicopters into the town while the fourth force would make a diversionary attack at King Abdullah Bridge to draw the Jordanian forces from Karameh and to cover the main attack.

Prior to the attack, the Israeli Air Force (IAF) dropped leaflets telling the Jordanian army that Israel had no intention to hurt them, and that they should not intervene; the leaflets went unheeded. Time magazine reported the fedayeen had been warned in advance by Egyptian intelligence, and most of the 2,000 Arab commandos who used Karameh as a training base had pulled back into the surrounding hills to snipe at the Israelis. Some 200 guerrillas stayed inside to defend the town. Later, Arafat's deputy, Abu Iyad, claimed in his memoirs that he and Arafat had been tipped off about the Israeli attack by Jordanian officers, who learned it from the CIA.

== Battle ==
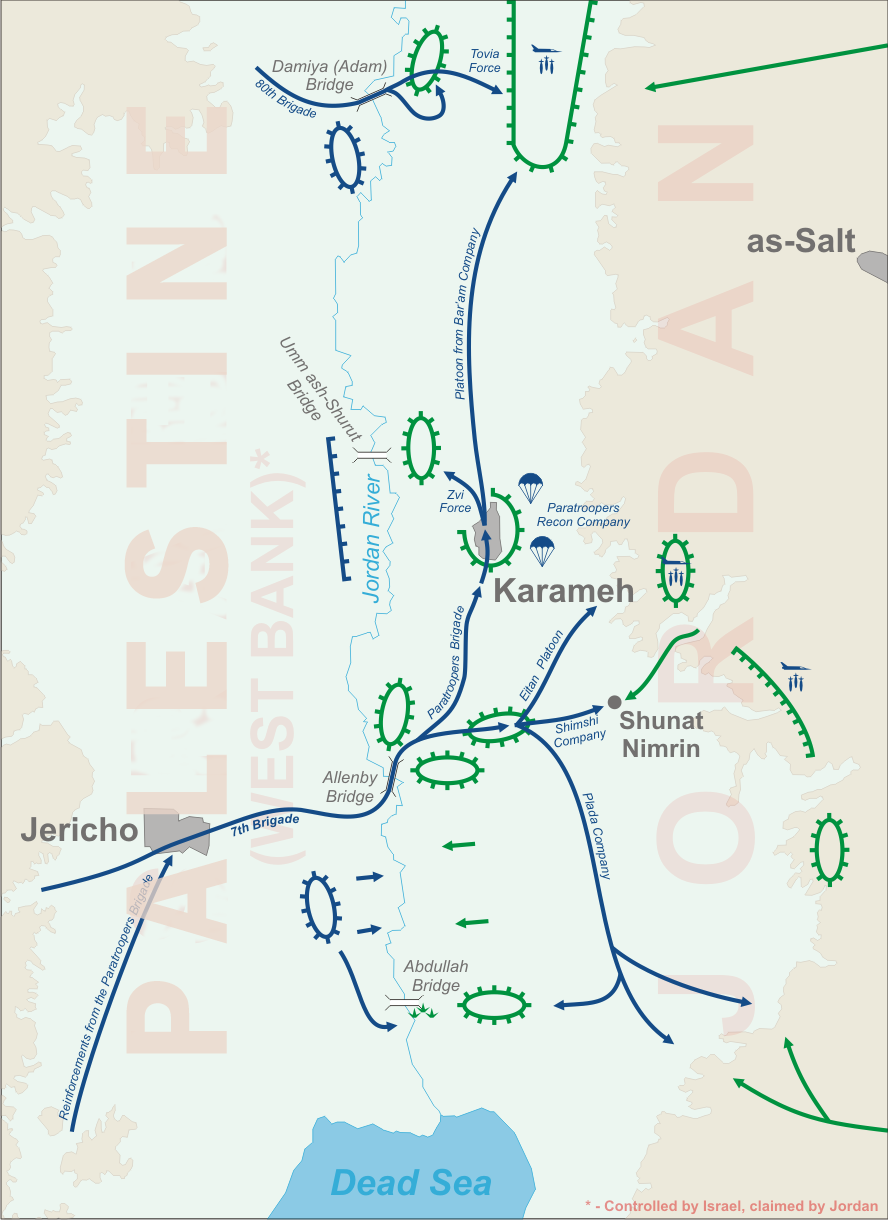
Map showing the Jordanian positions (green) and the Israeli advance (blue)

At 5:30 AM on 21 March, the Israeli forces attacked simultaneously on the three bridges. Combat engineers built a pontoon bridge in the north and the troops crossed the river. The Israeli spearheads pushed across the Allenby Bridge and advanced towards Shunat Nimreen.

At 6:30 AM, Israeli helicopters started landing the bulk of the paratrooper battalion north of Karameh. An Israeli aircraft was supposed to drop leaflets addressed to Fatah, after the paratroopers had surrounded the town; however, due to difficult weather conditions, the helicopters flying the paratroopers arrived twenty minutes too late. Met with resistance by Fatah commandos and Jordanian troops supported by Jordanian artillery, the paratroopers suffered heavy losses. When the southern task force began their drive north towards Karameh, they encountered a Jordanian infantry brigade supported by armor, artillery and antitank weapons. The Israeli Air Force launched airstrikes, but was only able to inflict minor damage on the dug-in Jordanians. Fighting from their entrenched positions, the Jordanians repelled several Israeli assaults.

In the south, Jordanian artillery shelling prevented the Israelis from erecting another pontoon bridge on the site of the Abdullah bridge, halting the Israeli advance there. After crossing the Allenby Bridge, the 7th Armored Brigade spread in three directions from Shuna: One or more companies drove north to Karameh. An infantry battalion and a tank battalion moved east to block the Salt road. And another infantry battalion moved south to assist the force trying to break across the Abdullah Bridge. Meanwhile, the force that crossed the Damia Bridge established itself on the east bank. Engineers began constructing a new bridge, and the force advanced east to the Musri junction. After taking Musri, their intended advance south to Karameh was repulsed by the northern brigade of the Jordanian 1st Division.

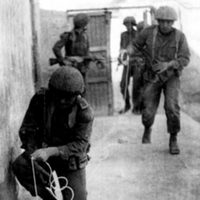
Israeli soldiers during a house raid in Karameh

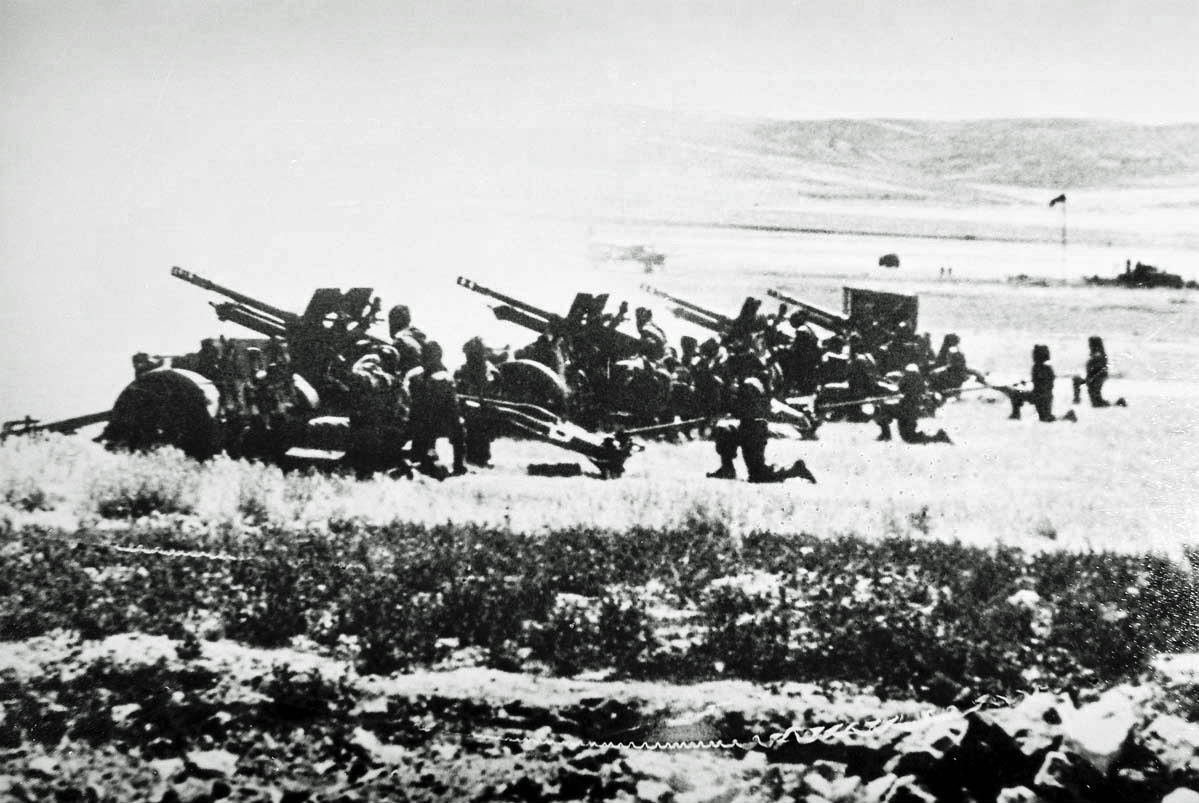
Jordanian artillery battery at Karameh

The force driving on Karameh via the Allenby bridge broke through and proceeded to the town, arriving shortly before 7:00. By 8:00 the Israeli forces had taken control of the town, which turned out to be a bigger PLO base than the Israelis expected. Combined with the paratroopers, this Israeli force engaged in heavy fighting against the central brigade of the 1st division and a number of Fatah fighters. Some of the paratroopers and armor drove north to operate in the Fatah camp. The paratroopers destroyed most of the camp; many of the Palestinians, including Arafat, fled eastward. The rest of the Allenby Bridge force was blocked to the east and south of Shuna, by elements of the 1st Division's central and southern brigades, and by a tank battalion from Salt. A small force of Israeli infantry and armor, on the right flank of Israeli forces invading from the south, tried to protect the Allenby Bridge force from attacks by the Jordanian forces deployed near the King Abdullah bridge. The Jordanians attacked with some armor, but the Israelis put up resistance, and the battle turned into a stalemate.

A large force of Israeli infantry and armor went east to block the road from Salt to the Allenby bridge, and they encountered the Jordanian 60th Armored Brigade trying to join the defense of Karameh. In the resulting battle, the Jordanians lost eight Patton tanks without destroying any Israeli tanks, then withdrew to the hills to dig in and continue firing down on the Israelis. The Israeli Air Force launched airstrikes against Jordanian armor and artillery positions, but was unable to stop the firing. Within the next two hours, Israeli artillery fire and airstrikes were launched against Jordanian defenses on the Musri-Karameh road, the Salt road, and east of Abdullah Bridge. The Israelis also consolidated their hold on Karameh with airstrikes and artillery, and began demolishing the camp. A total of 175 houses were blown up.

Meanwhile, Operation Asuta was mounted against a few smaller guerrilla bases south of the Dead Sea, near Ghor es-Safi, where the school bus had struck the mine. The bases were raided by Israeli ground forces with close air support. About 20 Jordanian soldiers and policemen and 20 Fatah fighters were killed, and 27 were taken prisoner. The Israelis suffered no casualties. Frustrated in their hope to entrap the entire PLO force, the Israelis soon pulled out, but had to fight their way back to Israeli territory. At 11:00 the Israelis began to withdraw, with Sikorsky H-34 helicopters evacuating the troops. Because orders came down to recover as many vehicles as possible, they only completed their withdrawal by 20:40. They had planned a rescue for two tanks which were left behind but later withdrew the plan.

=== Casualties ===
Casualties estimates vary:

- Israel: Chaim Herzog and Kenneth Pollack estimate 28 dead and 69 wounded; Shabtai Teveth gives 32 killed and 70 wounded out of a force of 1,000 soldiers. Benny Morris writes that Israel lost 33 dead and 161 wounded. 27 Israeli tanks were damaged by Jordanian artillery, 4 of which were left behind, two half-tracks, six armored cars and one Dassault Ouragan aircraft, although the pilot succeeded in parachuting to safety. A Mirage had to crash land.
- Jordan: Zeev Maoz and Benny Morris cite a figure of some 84 Jordanian soldiers killed and another 250 wounded. Four were captured. 30 tanks were damaged. Other estimates claim 40 dead and 108 wounded.
- PLO: Herzog: 200 dead, 150 captured; Morris: 156 dead, 141 captured; Pollack: 100 dead, 100 wounded, 120–150 captured. According to Morris, a further 20 PLO guerillas were killed and 27 captured during the corresponding Operation Asuta. Teveth states 170 killed and 130 taken prisoner.

=== Gallery ===
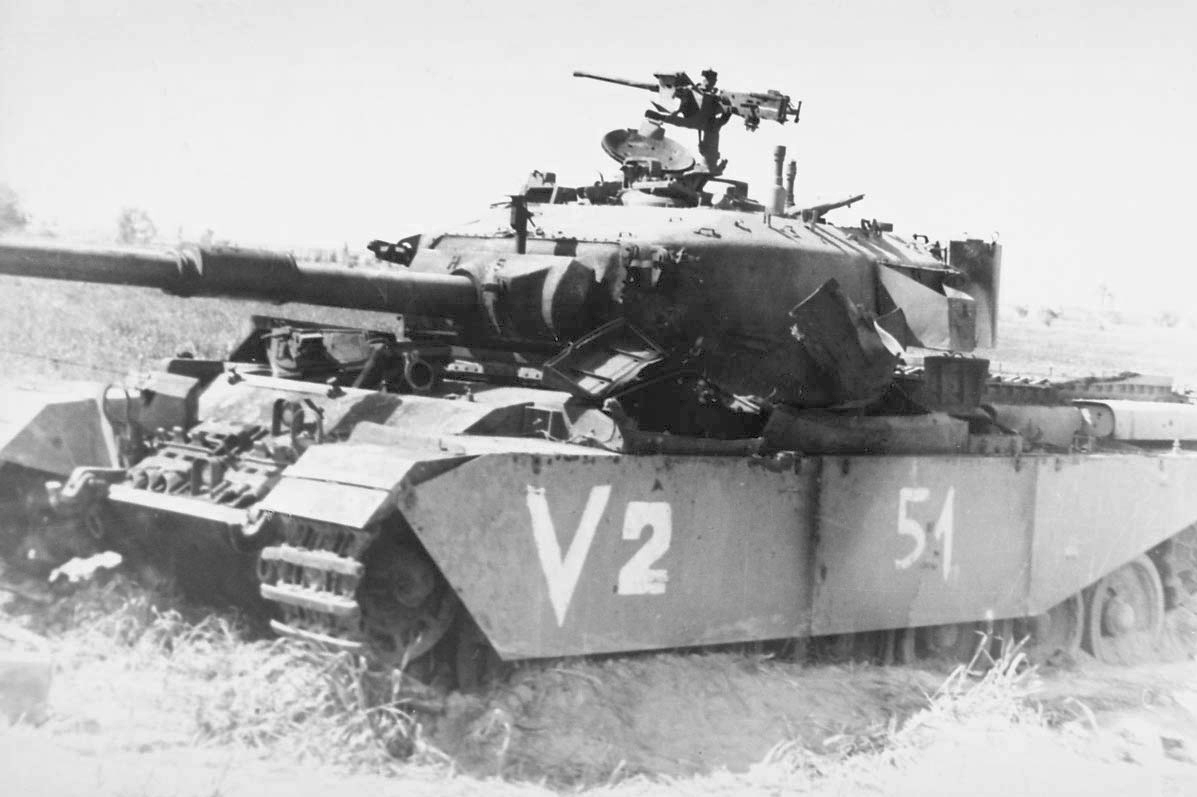

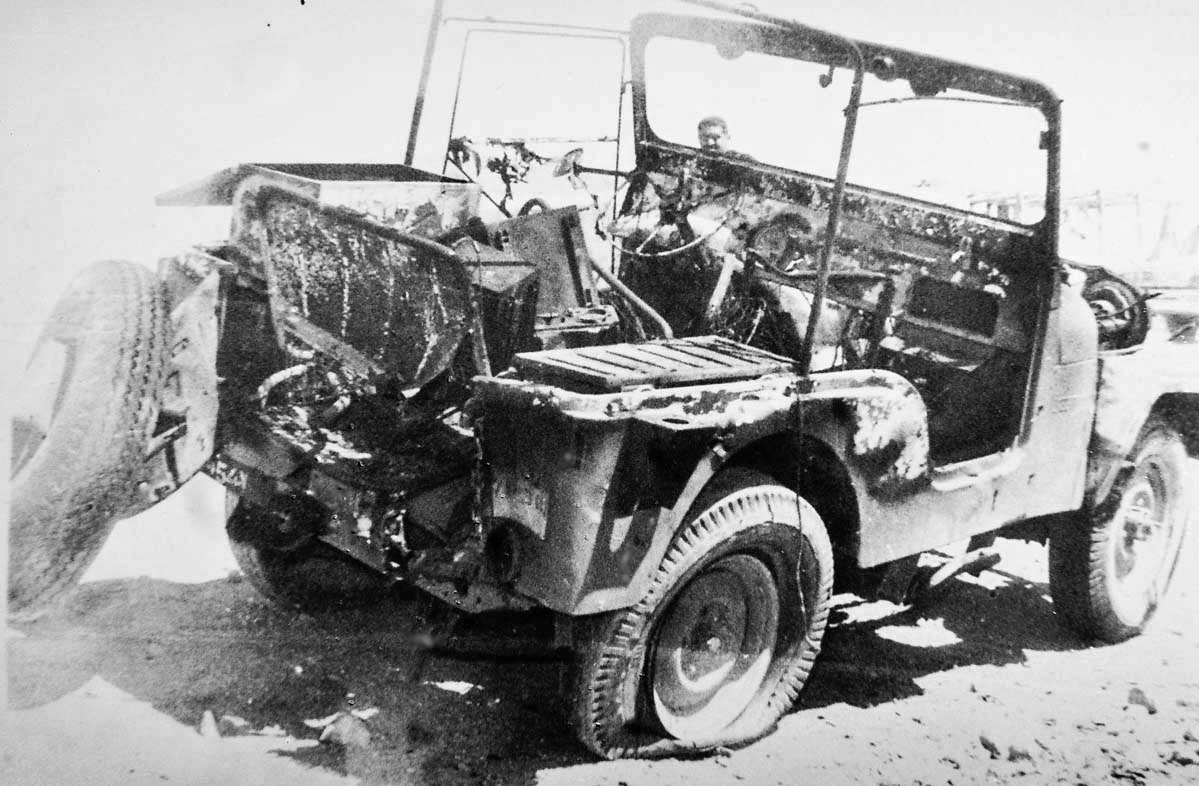

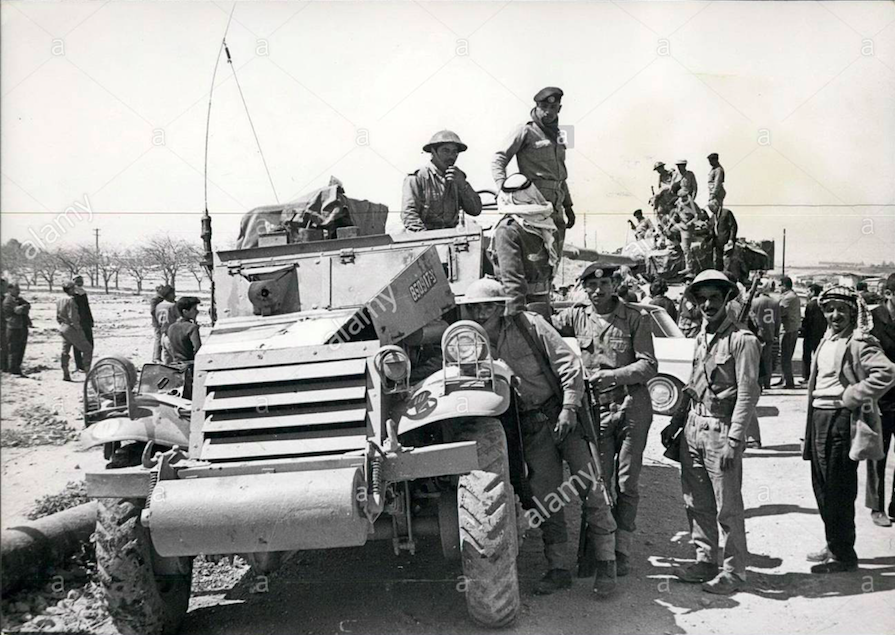

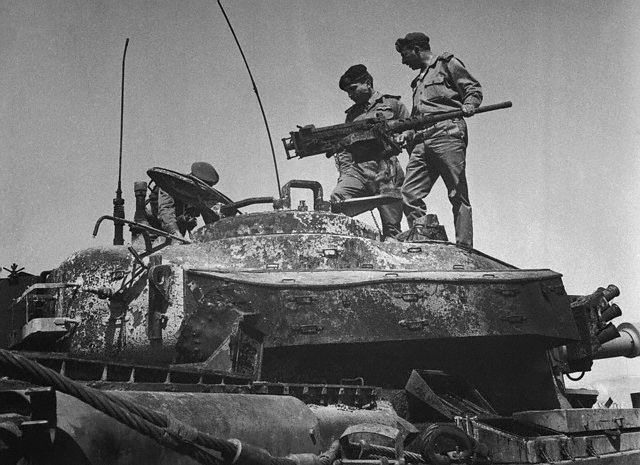
Jordanian soldiers surrounding Israeli abandoned or destroyed trucks and tanks which were paraded across Amman and put on display at the Hashemite Plaza

== Aftermath ==
Israel accomplished its objective of destroying the Fatah camp, the battle ended in Israel's favor on a tactical level. "The Karama operation exposed the vulnerability of PLO units deployed along the Jordan River and so they moved their concentrations up into the mountains. This imposed additional strains on them and made their operations into the West Bank even more involved and difficult than they had been hitherto." Politically however, Israel was heavily condemned by the world opinion. U.S. Ambassador to the UN, Arthur Goldberg, said "We believe that the military counteractions such as those which have just taken place, on a scale out of proportion to the acts of violence that preceded it, are greatly to be deplored." US Ambassador to Israel, Walworth Barbour, said that in twenty years time, a historian would write that day down as the beginning of the destruction of Israel. Eban reported the Ambassabor's statement to the cabinet, and Menachem Begin said such an utterance must not be cited in a cabinet meeting.

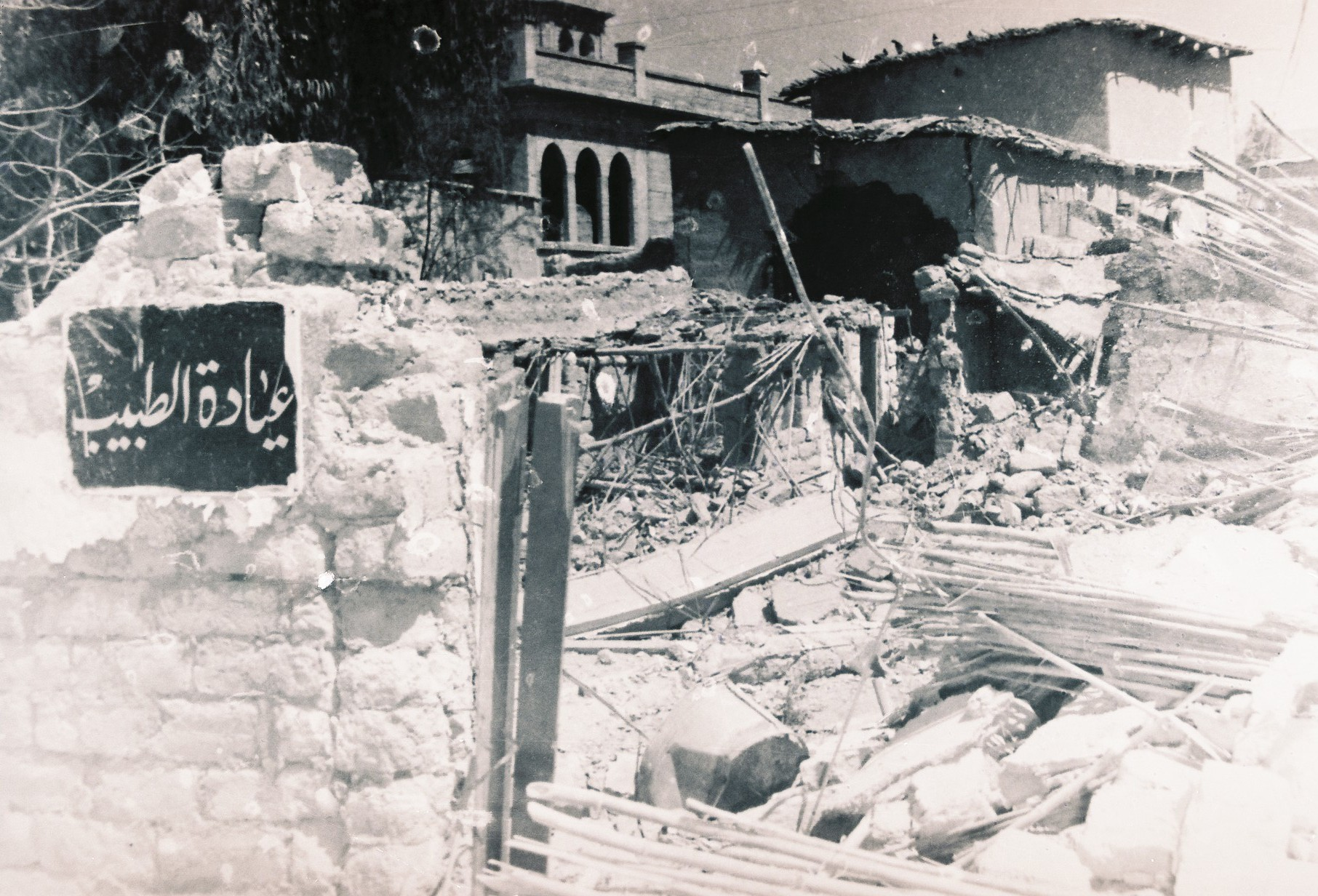
The ruins of Karameh following the battle

The relatively high casualties were a considerable surprise for the Israeli military and was stunning to the Israeli public. Although the Palestinians were not victorious on their own, King Hussein let the Palestinians take credit. However, the battle of Karameh provided Fatah with a propaganda boost. The chief of bureau of the then Israeli Foreign ministry Gideon Rafael later said that "The operation gave an enormous lift to Yasser Arafat's Fatah organization and irrevocably implanted the Palestine problem onto the international agenda, no longer as a humanitarian issue of homeless refugees, but as a claim to Palestinian statehood". Uzi Narkiss, who commanded the operation, resigned as chief of the Central Command for a position in the Jewish Agency shortly after the battle.

Jordan claimed to have won the battle and stopped an Israeli drive on Balqa Governorate in intentions of occupying it and turning into a security buffer zone, which was supposed to serve as a punishment, due to the Jordanian support to the PLO. The Jordanians made this assumption as they saw the size of the raiding Israeli forces entering the battle. Arafat said "What we have done is to make the world ... realize that the Palestinian is no longer refugee number so and so, but the member of a people who hold the reins of their own destiny and are in a position to determine their own future". Palestinians and Arabs generally considered the battle a psychological victory over the Israeli military, which had been seen as 'invincible' until then, and recruitment to guerilla units soared. Fatah reported that 5,000 volunteers applied to join within 48 hours of the battle. By late March, there were nearly 20,000 fedayeen in Jordan.

Iraq and Syria offered training programs for several thousand guerrillas. The Persian Gulf states, led by Kuwait, raised money for them through a 5% tax on the salaries of their tens of thousands of resident Palestinian workers, and a fund drive in Lebanon raised $500,000 from Beirut alone. The Palestinian organizations began to guarantee a lifetime support for the families of all guerrillas killed in action. Within a year after the battle, Fatah had branches in about eighty countries.

After the battle, the Fatah membership increased and more than 5000 individuals applied to join Fatah within the next 48 hours following the end of the battle. Fatah also began to engage in communal projects to achieve popular affiliation. The battle of Karameh and the subsequent increase in the PLO's strength are considered to have been important catalysts for the 1970 events of the civil war known as Black September, in which the kingdom managed to expel the Palestinian groups to Lebanon after they had started to gain control over Jordan.

Later, the United Nations Security Council issued resolution 248 which condemned the Israeli raid on Jordanian territory and the violation of the cease-fire line, it recalled on resolutions 237 which had encouraged Israel to ensure the safety of civilians in military areas. The resolution affirmed that reprisals were not to be tolerated and that repetitions of such violations would have forced the Security Council to take further steps.

The battle was the first engagement between the Israelis and Palestinians, in which the latter used suicide bombers. Files released by the Israeli military in 2011 revealed that it had begun planning the two operations in 1967, one year before the bus incident. They also revealed that the IDF had practiced crossing the Jordan River in 1966, while Jordan still controlled the West Bank.

== Historiography ==
=== Israeli historiography ===
Israel maintains that it had performed a coordinated withdrawal after achieving its goal of destroying the Karameh camp. However, few Israeli military personnel who participated in Karameh agree.

According to Lt. Col. Arik Regev, chief of Central Command's operations branch,

We didn't expect the Jordanian army to fight the way it did. I don't believe that the commander of the 7th Brigade thought that so many of his tanks would be hit. I'm sure that no one thought that the enemy would respond with artillery fire. You're allowed to make a mistake in assessing a situation but, it seems to me, there was a moment when the assessment could have been altered – when we saw that things weren't turning out as we had thought and that the Jordanians weren't fleeing to Amman. Had we thought that the Jordanian army would act as it did, I'm convinced the air force would have struck first.

Moshe Barbalat, a sergeant in the Israeli Armored Corps who lost both his legs in the battle and was awarded the Medal of Distinguished Service, later talked about his participation in Karameh: "Everything was burning around me, and whenever I tried I could not get up."

Dr. Asher Porat stated "lessons of the operation became clear that it was a mistake to fight the Jordanian army."

Muki Betser, a commander in the Sayeret Matkal commando unit, wrote in his book,

Both military and political decision makers responsible for the operation worked to make sure the public never knew of the debacle. Instead, in newspaper interviews and speeches, the politicians and generals made Karameh sound like a smashing success.

A 2011 Haaretz article, an Israeli media outlet, described the battle as "one of the darkest chapters in Israel's military history".

=== Jordanian and Palestinian historiography ===
Arab historians argue that Israel had entered the Battle of Karameh overconfident of its abilities, as it took place just after Israel had defeated the Arabs in the 1967 Six-Day War. The size of the Israeli forces entering Karameh made the Jordanians assume that Israel was also planning to occupy the eastern bank of the Jordan River, including the Balqa Governorate, to create a situation similar to the Golan Heights, which Israel had captured just 10 months prior, to be used a bargaining chip. Jordanians claim that Moshe Dayan invited Israeli journalists on the previous day for lunch in western Jordan after occupying it.

The Battle of Karameh was the subject of many artworks, stamps and posters.
