= Karameh =

Al-Karameh الكرامة
- Town
- Location in Jordan
- Coordinates: 31°57′06″N 35°34′48″E
- PAL: 204/151
- Country: Jordan
- Governorate: Balqa Governorate

Al-Karameh (Arabic: الكرامة), or simply Karameh, is a town in west-central Jordan, near the Allenby Bridge which spans the Jordan River.

Karameh sits on the eastern bank of the river, along the border between Jordan and Palestine. One of several Jordanian-Palestinian border crossings is located here, this particular crossing is known in Jordan as the King Hussein Bridge. The town was the location of a 15-hour military engagement between the Israel Defense Forces (IDF) and combined forces of the Palestine Liberation Organization (PLO) and the Jordanian Armed Forces (JAF) in the Jordanian town of Karameh on 21 March 1968, during the War of Attrition. In the aftermath of the battle, PLO's strength began to grow, and the Palestinian militant group began to speak openly of overthrowing the Jordanian Hashemite monarchy, and the ensuing tensions between the Palestinians and the Jordanian authorities eventually precipitated their expulsion from Jordan and subsequent exile to Lebanon during the events of Black September, or Jordanian Civil War, in 1970.
