= King Abdullah Bridge =

Bridge in West Bank, Israel

Coordinates: 31°48′3.85″N 35°32′53.04″E

The King Abdullah Bridge (Arabic: جسر الملك عبد الله, Hebrew: גשר עבדאללה - גשר חוגים) is a destroyed bridge over the Jordan River in the northern Dead Sea region near the remains of Beit HaArava. It formerly connected the area of Jericho with Jordan and formed part of the main road between Jerusalem and Amman. The bridge is named afterAbdullah I of Jordan, the first king of Jordan.

The bridge is located approximately 5 kilometres southeast of Jericho and about 4 kilometres south of the Allenby Bridge. The remains of the bridge are situated near the Jordan River's outlet into the Dead Sea.

== History ==
The bridge was constructed in 1950, during the period of Jordanian rule, as part of the main road connecting Jerusalem with Amman. The route followed one of the shortest road connections between the two cities, which are approximately 60 kilometres apart at their closest points. On the Israeli side, the road is now part of Highway 1, while on the Jordanian side it is designated as Road 40.

The bridge was named after Abdullah I of Jordan. It was subsequently rebuilt during the reign of his grandson, Hussein of Jordan, as part of the road connection between Jordan and Jerusalem.

During the Six-Day War, on 7 June 1967, the bridge was destroyed by explosives placed by sappers of the Harel Brigade of the Israel Defense Forces. The bridge was not rebuilt and has remained out of use since then. The surviving remains include sections of concrete and iron beams.

Following the war, the site came under Israeli control as part of the West Bank. The Israeli Government Names Committee subsequently gave the site the Hebrew name Gesher Hugim ("Hugim Bridge"), after the former name of the HaNoar HaOved VeHaLomed movement. Members of the movement had established the nearby Beit HaArava kibbutz.

== Gallery ==
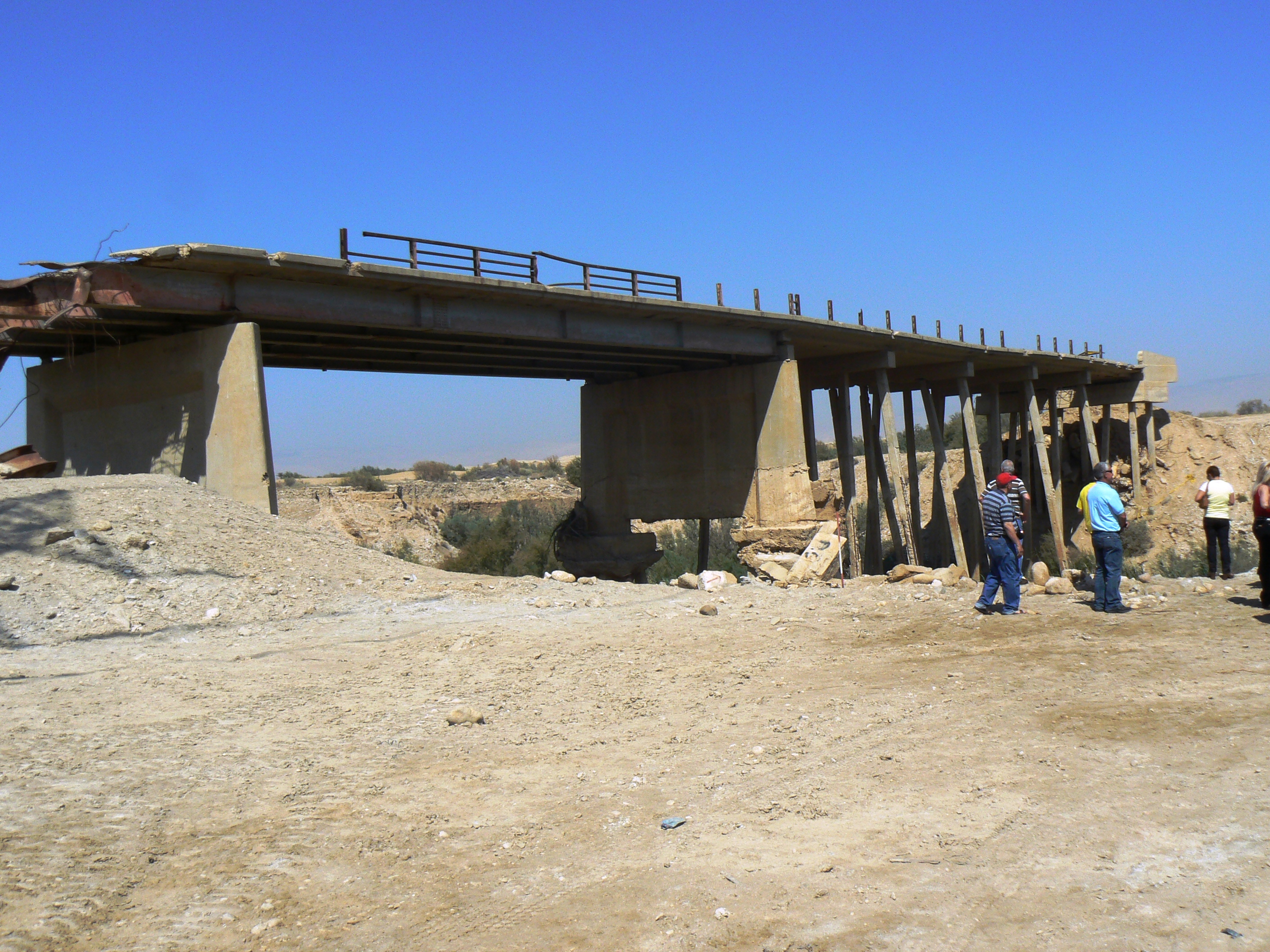
King Abdullah Bridge: East side (2008)

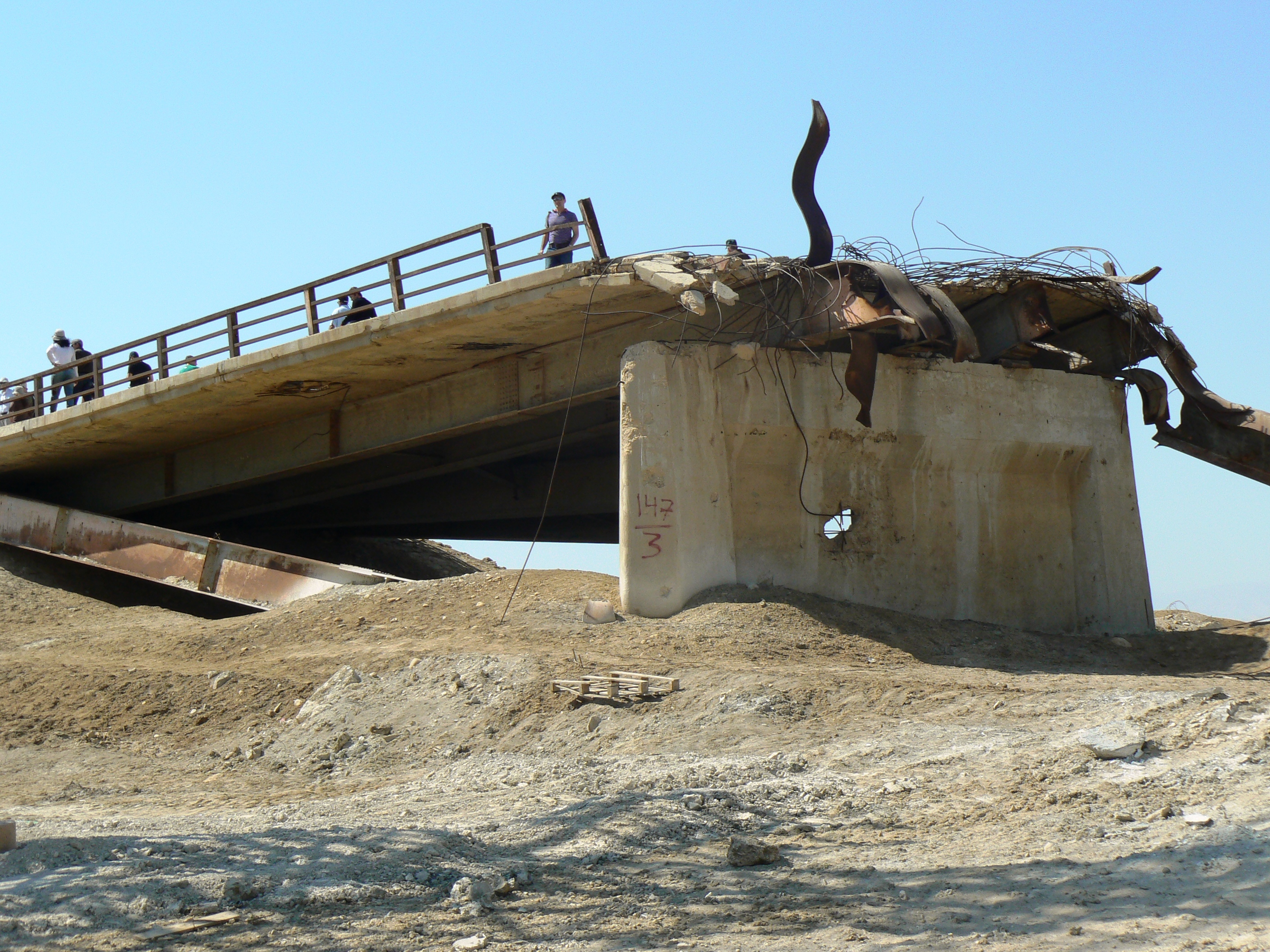
King Abdullah Bridge: West side (2008)

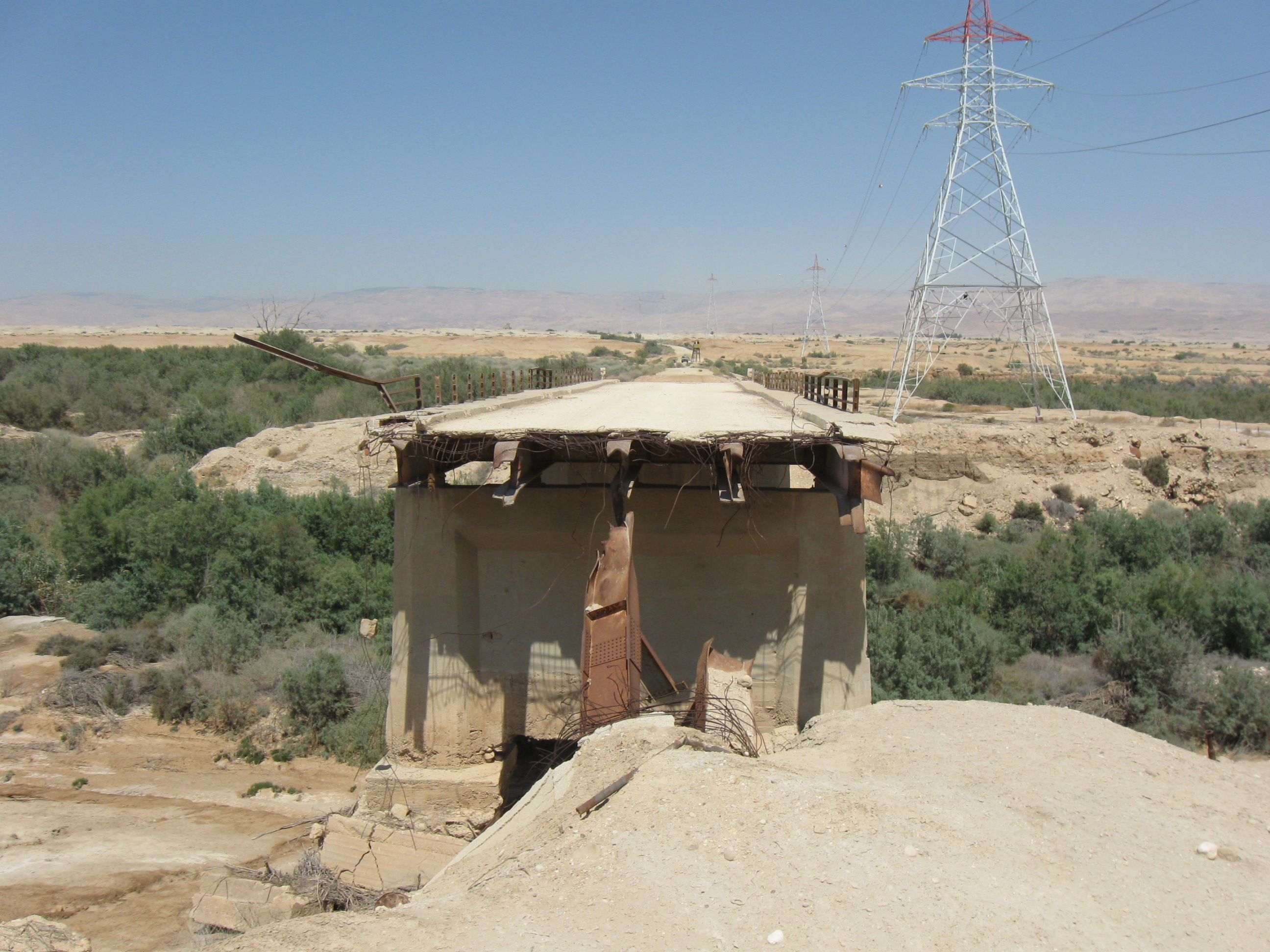
A view of the bridge's eastern section as seen from the western section (2012)

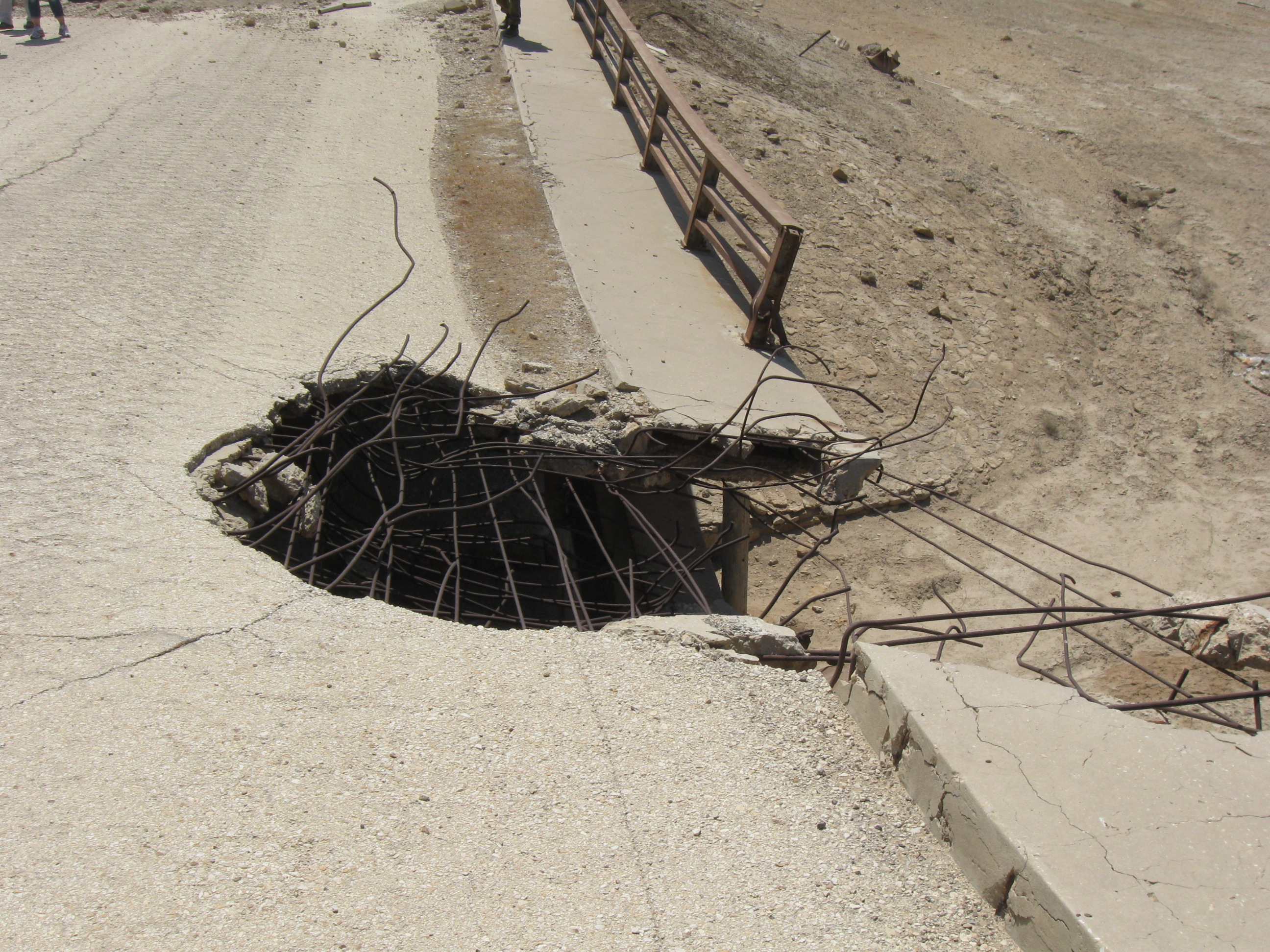
A hole on the bridge (2012)

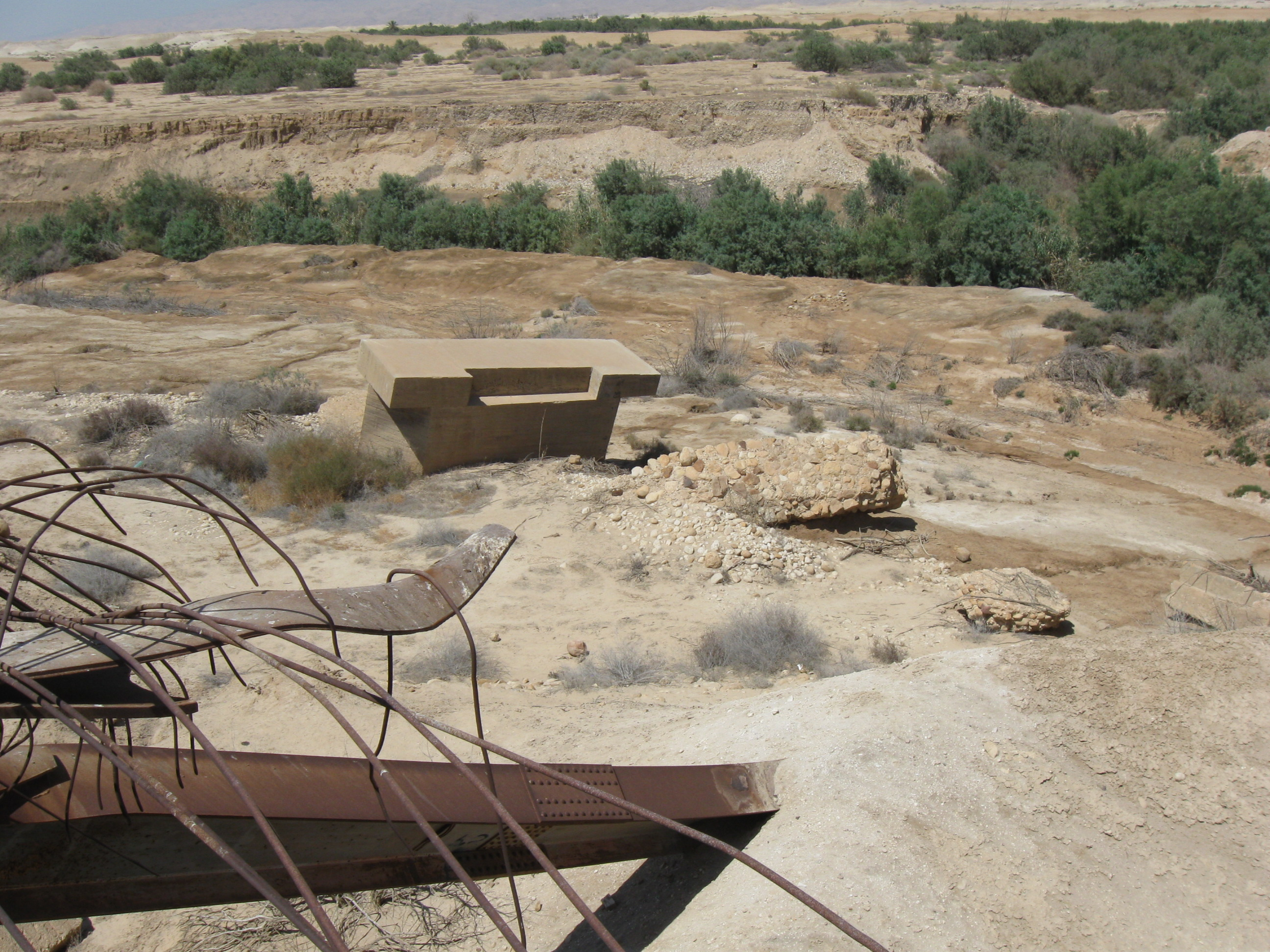
A view from atop the bridge (2012)
