= Abu Ali Iyad =

Palestinian military commander

Abu Ali Iyad وليد أحمد نمر
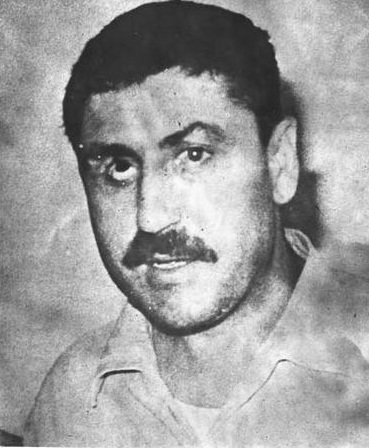
- Portrait of Abu Ali Iyad, published by PLO in 1971
- Born: Walid Ahmad Nimr; 1934; Qalqilyah, Mandatory Palestine
- Died: July 23, 1971 (aged 36-37); Ajlun-Jerash, Jordan
- Military career
- Allegiance: Fatah/Palestine Liberation Organization
- Branch: Al-Assifa
- Service years: 1964–1971
- Rank: Commander
- Nickname: Abu Ali Iyad
- Conflicts: War of Attrition; Battle of Karameh; Jordanian Civil War; Ajlun offensive †

Walid Ahmad Nimr (Arabic: وليد أحمد نمر; 1934 – July 23, 1971), better known by his nom de guerre Abu Ali Iyad (Arabic: أبو علي إياد), was a Palestinian militant and senior paramilitary field commander based in Syria and Jordan during the 1960s and early 1970s.

After a career of teaching in the West Bank, Iraq, Saudi Arabia and Algeria, Abu Ali Iyad was recruited into the paramilitary group, Fatah, by Khalil al-Wazir in 1964 after graduating from an Algerian military training course. A year later, he became one of Fatah's first leaders in Syria along with al-Wazir and Yasser Arafat. During his time there, Abu Ali Iyad gained a position on the group's top political body, supervised its main guerrilla training camp in Daraa and set up a military intelligence headquarters.

As a Fatah field commander, he fought Israeli forces at the Battle of Karameh, gaining a reputation as an unyielding commander. Abu Ali Iyad was also a leading organizer and participant in guerrilla raids against Israeli localities. He was one of the last Palestinian commanders to fight the Jordanian Army in the aftermath of Black September (also known as the Jordanian Civil War). He was killed in action at the countryside around Ajlun and Jerash by Jordanian forces during the Ajlun offensive in July 1971. His partisans claimed that he was executed, and as retaliation, they assassinated Jordanian prime minister Wasfi al-Tal four months after Abu Ali Iyad's death.

== Early life ==
Abu Ali Iyad was born in Qalqilya in the present-day West Bank in 1934 when Palestine was under the British Mandate. He was educated there, graduating from high school in 1953 and taught at schools in the city and nearby Azzun. A year later, he moved to Baquba, Iraq where he enrolled in a teacher training program. He left Iraq the same year, moving to Saudi Arabia to teach there afterward. In 1962, he had a job as a teacher in Algeria. However, he soon sought and received training by the Algerian Army, graduating from its training course in the summer of 1964.

== Fatah command ==
While in Algeria, Abu Ali Iyad was recruited into the Palestinian nationalist paramilitary organization Fatah by the leader of its armed wing Khalil al-Wazir. He adopted his nom de guerre after joining. Fatah at the time was divided politically with the more non-violent leadership based in Kuwait and those supporting attacks against Israel based in Syria. Abu Ali Iyad, along with al-Wazir, Yasser Arafat, and three others in the Syrian camp, formed the organization's "emergency" field command in Damascus in 1965.

A year later al-Wazir, Arafat, and much of the Fatah military leadership were arrested by Syrian authorities loyal to Hafez al-Assad (who was Defense Minister at the time) as suspects in the murder of a pro-Assad paramilitary leader, Yusef Urabi. As a result, Abu Ali Iyad, al-Wazir's wife Intissar al-Wazir and fellow Fatah commander Ahmad Attrush were put in charge of Fatah's leadership in Syria. They formed a secret committee whose purpose was maintaining the military operations of Fatah's armed wing, al-Assifa, against Israel, launching attacks from Lebanon and Jordan and thus co-opting al-Assad's efforts to circumvent their activity. Abu Ali Iyad himself was arrested later by the Syrian authorities. He was released along with Arafat and two other Fatah leaders in August. Abu Ali Iyad then met al-Assad in person to sign an agreement on the terms of Fatah's presence and activities in Syria.

Following the release of the rest of Fatah's leadership, the Central Committee of Fatah—the organization's highest decision-making body, was reformed. Two of Arafat's rivals lost their positions in the new central committee and were replaced by his allies, Abu Ali Iyad and Salah Khalaf, tilting the balance of power within Fatah towards Syria instead of Kuwait. Abu Ali Iyad's position gave him responsibility for al-Assifa's operations against Israel from Syria and Lebanon. By the end of the year, he had personally led raids against a number of villages in northeastern Israel, including Kfar Giladi, Manara, Margaliot, and Beit Yosef. In the latter village, his unit was responsible for wounding two civilians and destroying three houses by explosives.

Also after his release, in 1966, Abu Ali Iyad became the chief military instructor of a training camp for Fatah recruits in the city of Hama in central Syria. He modeled it based on the Algerian training camp he graduated from. Most of his pupils were university students who would soon form Fatah's new guerrilla force. Abu Ali Iyad's course was the only one of its kind run by Fatah itself (often commanders would train in Algeria) and it provided the bulk of commanders for the group's guerrilla units for the next decade. These mostly young recruits became known as "Tiger Cubs." Among their ranks, Abu Ali Iyad gained a reputation for enforcing strict discipline. According to British Middle East expert, Patrick Seale, he also had a "fierce appearance" that left his soldiers in "awe"; after a malfunction while he was experimenting with explosives, he lost an eye and damaged one of his legs. In 1968, Abu Ali Iyad set up a Fatah headquarters for military intelligence in Dera'a, southern Syria. Its principal task was to penetrate the Jordanian Army and security agencies.

=== Commander in Jordan ===
He moved to Jordan in 1968 where he trained Fatah forces in Ajlun. Palestinian fedayeen activity persisted following the collective Arab defeat in the 1967 Six-Day War and Israel sought to end guerrilla attacks on its territory by launching an offensive against the Palestine Liberation Organization's (PLO) bases in Jordan. A major confrontation ensued between the Israeli Army and Fatah which came to be known as the Battle of Karameh. Abu Ali Iyad was a senior commander during the battle, gaining prominence and respect among the Palestinians for his performance as an unyielding military officer. Although Fatah took heavy losses, Israel eventually withdrew after the Jordanian Army entered the fray on Fatah's side. He continued to organize raids against Israeli army camps and towns in Israel and the West Bank while he was based in Jordan.

Relations between the PLO and King Hussein of Jordan began to deteriorate after Karameh, climaxing in September 1970 when armed conflict ensued between Palestinian and Jordanian forces. Prior to Jordanian military action, Abu Ali Iyad lobbied his colleagues in Fatah, who supported the forced ousting of the king, to withdraw from Amman and return to the countryside closer to the border with Israel. Palestinian factions did not heed his calls and their military bases in Amman were shelled by Jordanian forces. On September 17, an emergency meeting of PLO factions was held with the majority of those attending favoring confrontation with King Hussein's troops. Supporting al-Wazir, who was one of the few delegates to have reservations, Abu Ali Iyad argued against confrontation and warned that expectations of Syrian intervention on the side of the Palestinians was improbable. The Jordanians succeeded in defeating PLO forces in Amman and about 2,000 Palestinian guerrillas under al-Wazir's leadership evacuated the city northward to Ajlun.

Abu Ali Iyad was part of the field command there along with al-Wazir. They headed a force of roughly 2,500 guerrillas in the hilly terrain around Ajlun and Jerash. Their position was vulnerable due to the ineffectiveness of Palestinian guerrilla warfare against Jordanian armor in open areas versus urban warfare in the cities and Palestinian refugee camps. Most of the PLO leadership, including Arafat and al-Wazir, and hundreds of guerrillas escaped Jordan in April 1971 following pressure from Arab states, confiscation of weapons by the Jordanian Army and the closing of PLO offices in Amman. Abu Ali Iyad refused to do so, however, and he and his Tiger Cubs stayed put in their Ajlun base where they continued to fight the Jordanian Army.

On July 12, King Hussein ordered the evacuation of all guerrilla forces from the strategic mountain in the center of their stronghold in Ajlun. Hussein personally offered to allow Abu Ali Iyad to depart unharmed if he abandoned his fighters. He refused and Hussein ordered his troops to track down and kill him within the framework of routing out remaining PLO forces in northern Jordan. A Jordanian infantry division and armored brigade backed by 10,000 Bedouin foot soldiers immediately launched an offensive afterward. By July 16, Palestinian positions had been secured by the Jordanian Army. During the Jordanian offensive, 200-250 guerrillas had been killed and 70-100 of Abu Ali's troops fled, crossing the Jordan River to the Israeli-occupied West Bank.

== Death and aftermath ==
In early July, prior to the offensive, Abu Ali sent letters to Fatah leaders chastising them for surrendering to King Hussein's forces, stating in defiance "We will die on our feet rather than kneel." On July 23, he was reported killed by the Jordanian Army. According to Yezid Sayigh who documented the history of Palestinian guerrilla warfare, Abu Ali was "executed" during mop-up operations by the Jordanian Army sometime on July 17–18. Jordanian Bedouin troops tied his corpse to a tank and dragged it through several northern villages that had large Palestinian populations. The PLO claimed he was captured and tortured to death by Jordanian forces prior. Another version of events by Abu Ali's partisans was that the Jordanian prime minister at the time, Wasfi Tal, was personally responsible for his torture.

His partisans sought vengeance for his killing and a splinter group developed within Fatah consisting of men from the Tiger Cubs and other Fatah dissidents. It came to be known as the Black September Organization (BSO) and Abu Ali's men provided its initial membership. On November 28, one of his former Tiger Cubs, Munshir al-Khalifa, assassinated Tal in Cairo. According to Seale, this was the first attack carried out by the BSO.

Palestinian poet Mahmoud Darwish dedicated the poem "Returning to Jaffa" to Abu Ali Iyad.

== See also ==
- List of Fatah members

== Bibliography ==
- Amos, John (1980). Palestinian Resistance: organization of a nationalist movement. Pergamon Press. ISBN 0-08-025094-7.
- Bird, Kai (2010). Crossing Mandelbaum Gate: coming of age between the Arabs and Israelis, 1956-1978. Simon & Schuster. ISBN 978-1-4165-4440-1.
- Bowen, Jeremy (2004). Six Days: how the 1967 war shaped the Middle East. Pocket Books. ISBN 0-7434-4969-X.
- Genet, Jean; trans. Bray, Barbara (2003). Prisoner of Love. New York Review Books. ISBN 1-59017-028-8.
- Hart, Alan (1994). Arafat. Sidgwick & Jackson. ISBN 978-0-283-06220-9.
- Quandt, William B.; Jabber, Paul; Lesch, Ann Mosely (1973). The Politics of Palestinian nationalism. University of California Press. ISBN 0-520-02372-2. "Quandt Jabber Lesch Palestinian."
- Rapoport, David C. (2006). Terrorism: The third or new left wave. Taylor & Francis. ISBN 0-415-31653-7.
- Sayigh, Yezid (1997). Armed Struggle and the Search for State: the Palestinian national movement, 1949-1993. Oxford University Press US. ISBN 0-19-829265-1.
- Seale, Patrick (1992). Abu Nidal: a gun for hire. Random House. ISBN 0-679-40066-4.
