= Bahjat =

Bahjat is a masculine given name and surname of Arabic origin. Notable people with the name include:

== Given name ==
- Bahjat (singer) (born 1995), Libyan singer
- Bahjat Abu Gharbieh (1916–2012), Palestinian politician
- Bahjat al-Muhaisen (1927–2007), Jordanian general
- Bahjat Suleiman (1949–2021), Syrian diplomat
- Bahjat Talhouni (1913–1994), Jordanian political figure
- Hani Bahjat Tabbara (born 1939), Jordanian diplomat
- Mohammad Taghi Bahjat Foumani (1917–2009), Iranian Shia Marja

== Surname ==
- Atwar Bahjat (1976–2006), Iraqi journalist and reporter
