= Bahjat al-Muhaisen =

Jordanian general (1927–2007)

Bahjat Al-Muhaisen
- بهجت مصطفى باشا المحيسن
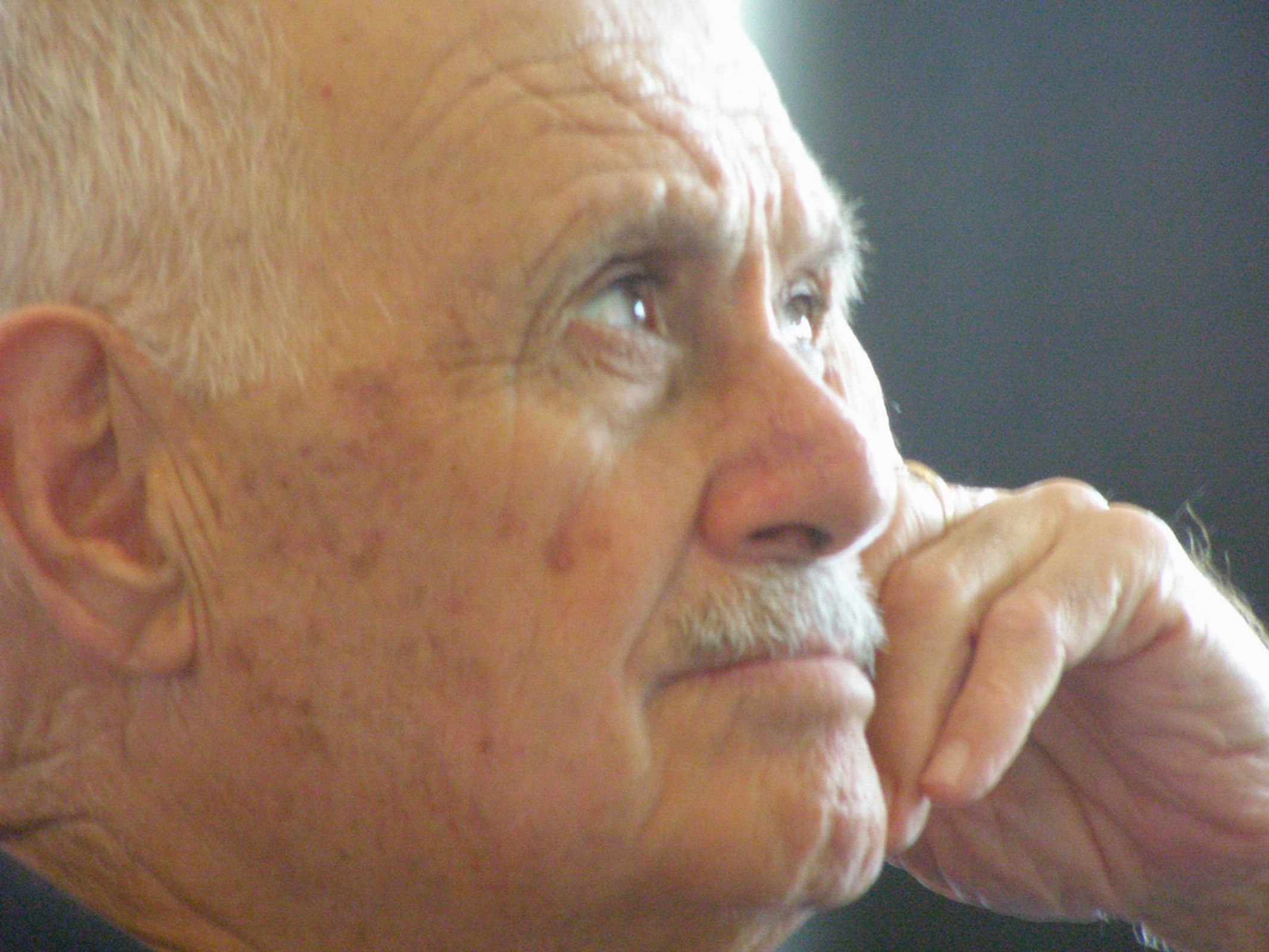

Personal details
- Born: 1927 Tafilah, Emirate of Transjordan (present-day Jordan)
- Died: 2007 (aged 79–80) Amman, Jordan

Military service
- Allegiance: Jordan
- Branch/service: Royal Jordanian Army
- Years of service: 1947 - 1972
- Rank: Brigadier general
- Commands: 2nd Infantry Division
- Battles/wars: Samu incident Six Day War; Battle of Karameh; Black September

Bahjat al-Muhaisen (1927 – 10 April 2007) was a Jordanian general who served in significant infantry commands throughout his career.

Bahjat al Muhaisen was born in Tafilah, Jordan in 1927 to Mustafa al-Muhaisen, a prominent landowner appointed as pasha of the Tafilah region by King Abdullah I. Enlisting on October 16, 1947, Al-Muhaisen joined the First Artillery Battalion with enlistment number 521. In 1957, He was appointed staff officer at the Royal Artillery Corps command following completion of an artillery staff course in the United Kingdom. Al-Muhaisen attended staff college at Fort Leavenworth in 1962. By 1966 he was the colonel in command of the Hettin Infantry Brigade stationed in the Hebron area. On 13 November 1966, an Israeli battalion commanded by Colonel Yoav Shaham—supported by a company of Sareyet Maktal led by Yonatan Netanyahu— broke through the Jordanian borders towards Samu village. Allegedly to destroy a Fatah base that was active in the area. The Jordanians named the incident The Battle of Samu, though Israelis refer to it as Operation Shredder. Colonel Al-Muhaisen was injured in the battle, while Colonel Yoav Shaham was killed in action. Al-Muhaisen was accorded high military honors for being the first senior officer injured in battle.

Seven months later, Al-Muhaisen participated in the Six-Day War without fighting and was ordered to retreat to the East Bank. His brigade was the last one to cross the Jordan River on 7 June 1967 before destroying its bridges. Hebron was captured that day by the IDF at 18:00. A little less than a year later, he saw action again in Battle of Karameh, as the Hettin Brigade engaged IDF forces in the Rama-Shouneh Amman triangle. That day ended decisively in favor of the Jordanian army.

Al-Muhaisen was transferred to the command of Al-Hussain bin Ali Brigade as a newly-promoted brigadier general, subsequently appointed as military attache to the Jordanian embassy in the United Kingdom. He was recalled back to Jordan less than a year later. Following his return, Al-Muhaisen was appointed commander of the 2nd Infantry Division based in the northern part of Jordan. The events of Black September were unfolding by this time, with most Fedayeen insurgents concentrated in the north of Jordan. Consequently, Al-Muhaisen was met with a number of developments that led him to submit his resignation in 1971. These developments included a lack of clarity within the command structure, as the High Command bypassed Al-Muhaisen and issued contradictory and inflammatory orders to his subordinates. Such orders, which included anti-partisan measures characteristic of the Northern Campaign, were attributed to Al-Muhaisen. Feeling that the High Command intended to pin its escalating measures on him, Al-Muhaisen resigned his command. Charged with desertion, Al-Muhaisen was sentenced to death following a military tribunal. He was later pardoned by King Hussein. He died in Amman, Jordan on 10 April 2007.
