= Asad Ghanma =

Jordanian military officer

Asaad Ghanma
- أسعد غنما
- Born: Asaad Ghanma; 14 February 1930; Al Husn, Emirate of Transjordan
- Died: 18 July 2006 (aged 76); Amman, Jordan
- Burial place: Jordan
- Military career
- Allegiance: Jordan
- Branch: Royal Jordanian Army
- Service years: 1945–1972
- Rank: Brigadier general
- Unit: 48th Infantry Battalion
- Conflicts: First Arab-Israeli War; Samu incident; Six-Day War; War of Attrition; Battle of Karameh; Jordanian Civil War

Asaad Ghanma (Arabic: أسعد غنما; 14 February 1930 – 18 July 2006) was a Jordanian military officer. He served as major and commander of the 48th Infantry Battalion of the Jordanian Army during the Six-Day War and the Battle of Karameh. After the Six-Day War, he was promoted to brigadier general and remained in the Jordanian Armed Forces until his retirement in 1972. He first rose to prominence for his role in the 1966 Samu Incident.

== Samu Incident ==
Asaad Ghanma was the commander of the 48th Infantry Battalion of the Jordanian army during the Samu Incident, which was the first Jordanian force to arrive at the battlefield. At the time of the Israeli raid into Samu, the Jordan's troops were strained, having been deployed across the 600-kilometer border with Israel and Ghanma's unit was the only one present in Samu's vicinity. The Israeli force consisted of eleven Centurion tanks, fifty armored half-tracks and 500 paratroopers and was backed by Ouragan bombers and eight field guns from the Israeli side of the border to counter any potential Jordanian armored vehicles or artillery.

As the Israelis entered Samu and surrounding villages, Ghanma's forces, divided into three companies headed directly towards the Israelis' blocking position and were intercepted northwest of Samu. Two other Jordanian companies were also intercepted from the northeast, but a Jordanian platoon managed to enter the town and engaged in close quarter fighting with the Israelis until the latter routed them. Fifteen Jordanian soldiers and three civilians were killed, 54 were wounded and much of Samu's buildings and infrastructure were heavily damaged or destroyed. An Israeli commander was killed and ten soldiers wounded. After the battle, Asaad Ghanma received the Medal of Bravery from the King Hussein, for his role in the battle.

== Bibliography ==
- Bowen, Jeremy (2003). Six Days: How the 1967 War Shaped the Middle East. Simon & Schuster. ISBN 9781471114755.
