= 1970 Arab League summit =

Meeting of Arab regional organization

Arab League Summit
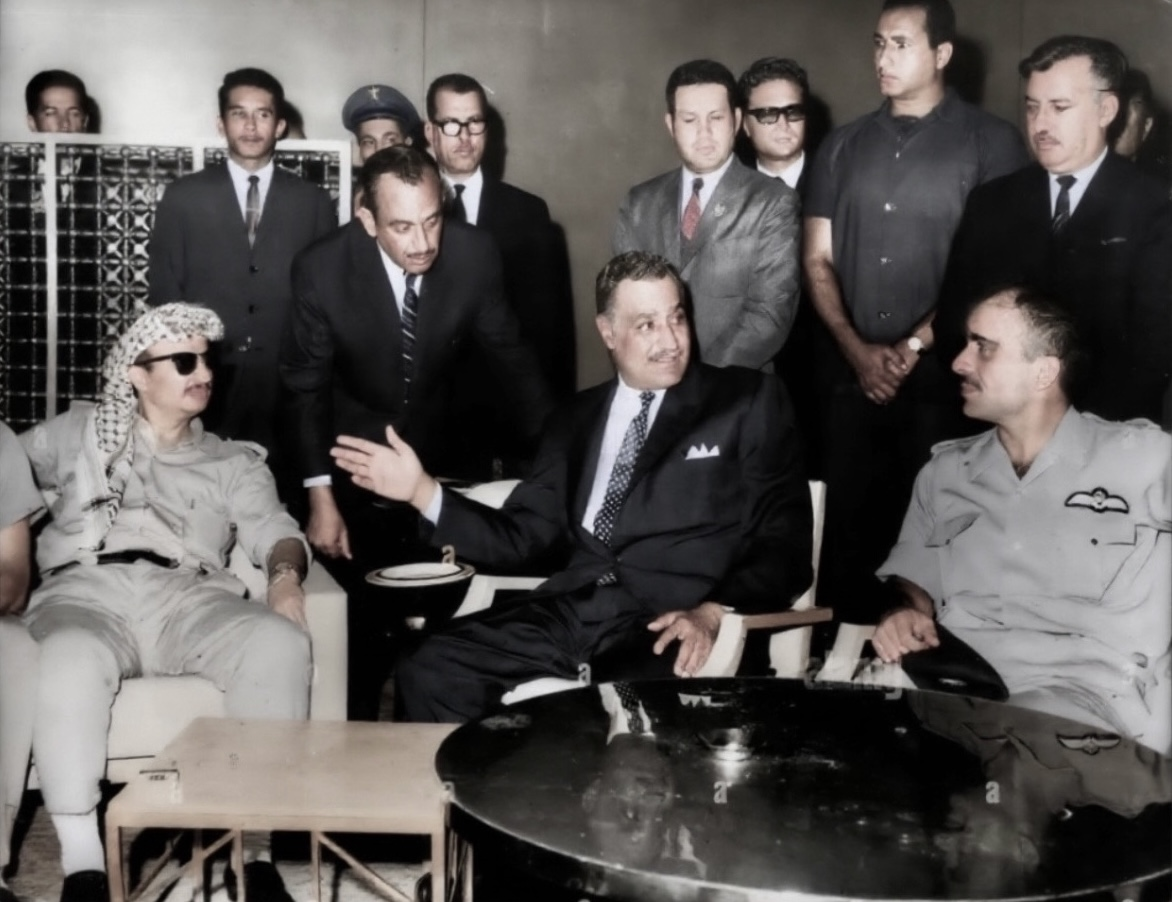
- Gamal Abdel Nasser of Egypt (center), Hussein of Jordan (right), Yasser Arafat of Palestine (left)
- Host country: United Arab Republic
- Date: September 27, 1970
- Cities: Cairo

The 1970 Arab League summit was held on September 27 in Cairo, then part of the United Arab Republic, as an extraordinary Arab League Summit.

== Overview ==
The summit came in the aftermath of the bloody events of the Jordanian Civil War, and the clashes between the Palestine Liberation Organization and King Hussein of Jordan.

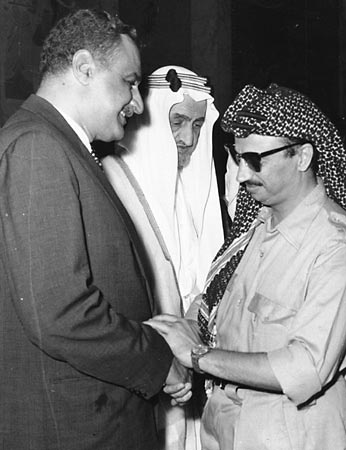
Gamal Abdel Nasser of Egypt (left), Faisal of Saudi Arabia (center), Yasser Arafat of Palestine (right)

Egyptian president Gamal Abdel Nasser succeeded in getting both King Hussein of Jordan and Yasser Arafat, the chairman of the PLO, to end the bloody battle between Jordanians and the Palestinian fedayeen. The summit concluded its work on September 28, hours before Nasser died. The summit was boycotted by Iraq, Syria, Algeria and Morocco.
