= United Nations Security Council Resolution 228 =

UN Security Council Resolution 228
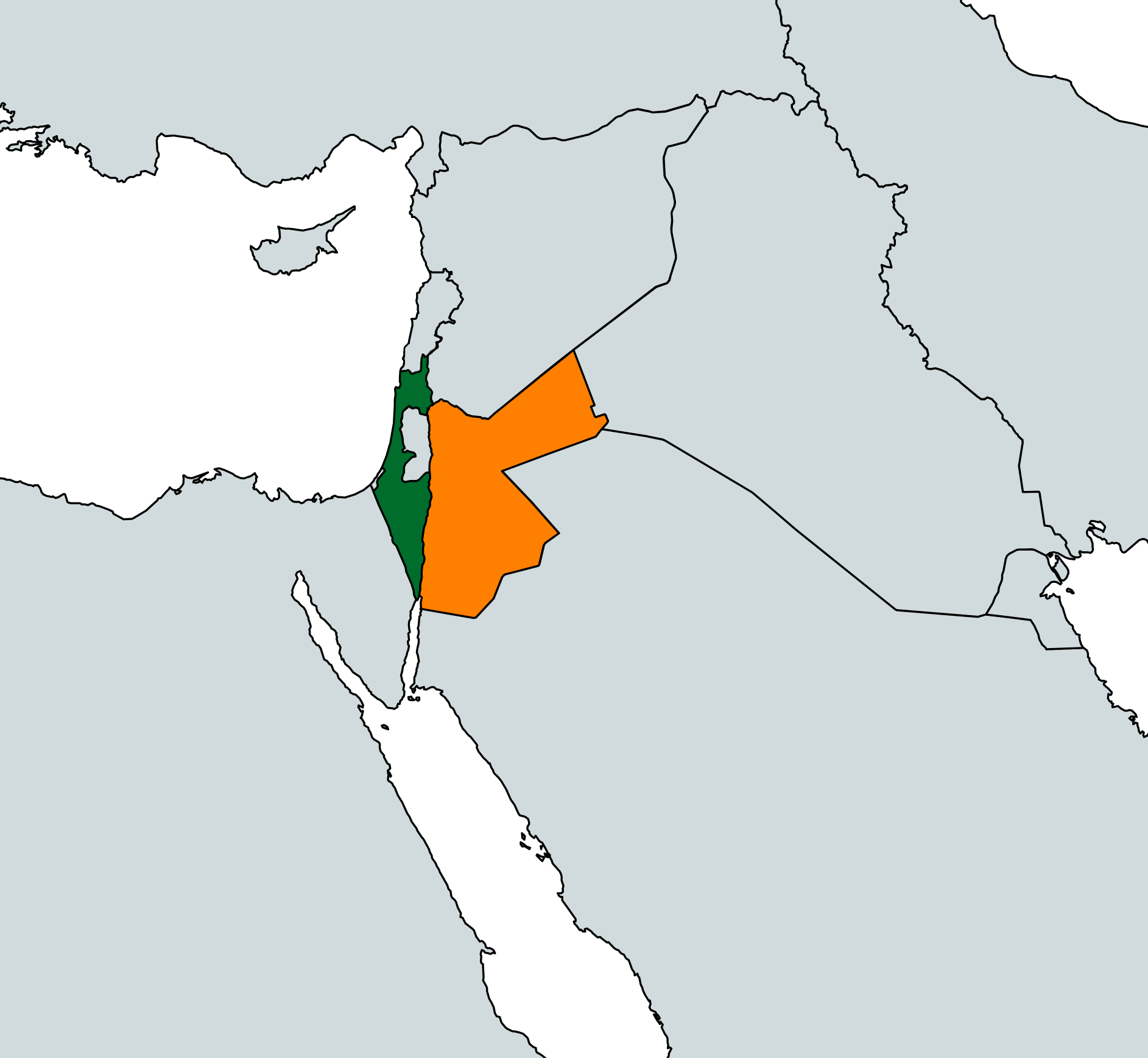
- Israel (green) and Jordan (orange)
- Date: November 25 1966
- Meeting no.: 1328
- Subject: The Palestine Question
- Voting summary: 14 voted for; None voted against; 1 abstained
- Result: Adopted

Security Council composition
- Permanent members: China; France; Soviet Union; United Kingdom; United States
- Non-permanent members: Argentina; Bulgaria; Japan; Jordan; Mali; Netherlands; New Zealand; Nigeria; Uganda; Uruguay

United Nations Security Council Resolution 228 was adopted by the United Nations Security Council on November 25, 1966, after hearing statements from representatives of Jordan and Israel, as well as a report from Secretary-General U Thant. The Council determined that the incident constituted a large-scale, carefully planned military action against Jordanian territory by the armed forces of Israel.

The Council deplored the loss of life and property and censured Israel for this violation of the Charter of the United Nations and the Armistice Agreements. The Council emphasized to Israel that further military actions will not be tolerated.

The resolution passed with 14 votes to none. New Zealand abstained.

== See also ==
- List of United Nations Security Council Resolutions 201 to 300 (1965–1971)
- The Samu Incident
