= Seven-point agreement (Jordan) =

1968 agreement between the PLO and Jordan regarding allowed activities

The Seven-point agreement was a pact between the Hashemite Kingdom of Jordan and the Palestine Liberation Organization, signed in November 1968, in order to legalize presence of PLO militias in the country. The PLO did not live up to the agreement, and instead came to be seen more and more as a state within a state in Jordan. Discipline in the Palestinian militias was often poor, and there was no central power to control the different groups. The agreement nominally held ground until 1970, when a civil war broke out in Jordan between Hashemite royal troops and PLO insurgents.

== Background ==
In Palestinian enclaves and refugee camps in Jordan, the Jordanian Police and army were losing their authority. Uniformed PLO militants openly carried weapons, set up checkpoints, and attempted to extort "taxes".

== Agreement ==
During the November 1968 negotiations, a seven-point agreement was reached between King Hussein and Palestinian organizations:

- Members of these organizations were forbidden from walking around cities armed and in uniform
- They were forbidden to stop and search civilian vehicles
- They were forbidden from competing with the Jordanian Army for recruits
- They were required to carry Jordanian identity papers
- Their vehicles were required to bear Jordanian license plates
- Crimes committed by members of the Palestinian organizations would be investigated by the Jordanian authorities
- Disputes between the Palestinian organizations and the government would be settled by a joint council of representatives of the king and of the PLO

== Execution of the agreement ==
The PLO did not live up to the agreement, and instead came to be seen more and more as a state within a state in Jordan. Discipline in the Palestinian militias was often poor, and there was no central power to control the different groups. Many of them were recently formed, and new groups sprang up spontaneously after the Karameh battle, or were set up by foreign governments such as Syria and Iraq. This created a bewildering scene of groups rapidly spawning, merging, and splintering, often trying to outdo each other in radicalism to attract recruits. Some left-wing Palestinian movements, such as the PFLP and the DFLP, began to openly question the legitimacy of the Jordanian monarchy and call for its overthrow, while at the same time stirring up conservative and religious feelings with provocative anti-religious statements and actions. In other cases, illustrating the lack of discipline on the fringes of the movement, fedayeen activity became a cover for gangsterism, with theft of vehicles or extortion of local merchants claimed as 'confiscation for the war effort' or 'donations to the cause'. The largest Palestinian faction, Arafat's Fatah, preached non-involvement in Jordanian affairs, but not all members lived up to this slogan. Fatah also protected smaller movements from being singled out for retaliation by the government by threatening to stand with them in any armed clashes. Palestinians claimed there were numerous agents provocateurs from Jordanian or other security services present among the fedayeen, deliberately trying to upset political relations and provoke justification for a crackdown.

Between mid-1968 and the end of 1969, no fewer than five hundred violent clashes occurred between the Palestinian guerrillas and Jordanian security forces. There were frequent kidnappings and acts of violence against civilians. Chief of the Jordanian Royal Court (and subsequently a Prime Minister) Zaid al-Rifai claimed that in one extreme instance, "the fedayeen killed a soldier, beheaded him, and played football with his head in the area where he used to live".

Militarily, the PLO continued attacking Israel from Jordanian territory with little regard for Jordanian authority or security. Heavy Israeli reprisals resulted in both Palestinian and Jordanian casualties, and the threat of larger-scale Israeli invasion loomed large.

== See also ==
- Fatahland
