= 1966 attack on Samu =

1966 bombardment of the Palestinian city of Samu by Israeli forces

- Part of the Reprisal Operations
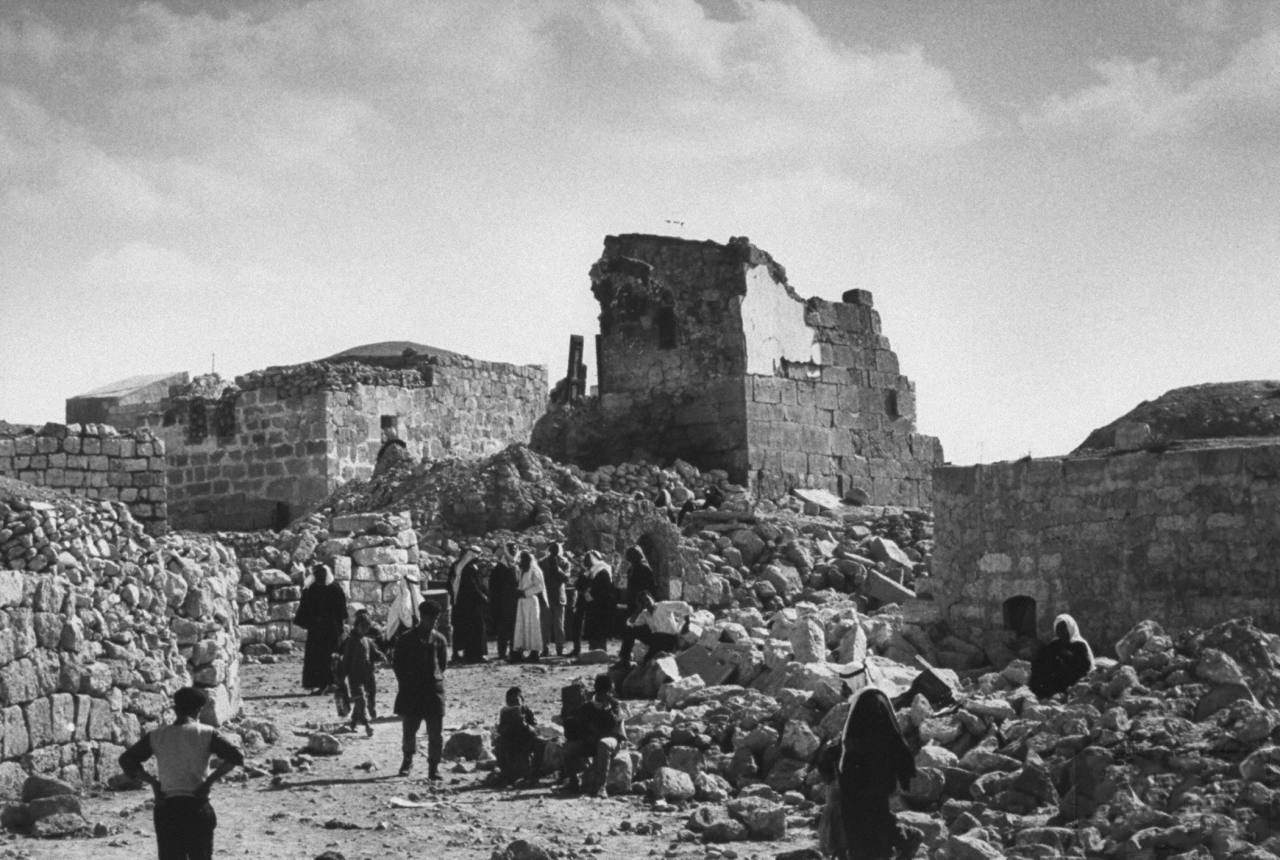
Date	13 November 1966
Location	Es Samu, Jordanian West Bank 31°24′N 35°04′E
Result	Build-up to Six-Day War

Belligerents
Israel	Jordan

Commanders and leaders
Rafael Eitan; Dov Tamari; Yeshayahu Gavish	King Hussein; Bahjat al-Muhaisen; Asad Ghanma

Strength
400 troops; 40 half-tracks; 10 tanks; 4 fighter jets	100 troops; 20 convoy vehicles; 8 fighter jets

Casualties and losses
1 killed; 10 wounded; 1 fighter jet damaged	16 killed; 54 wounded; 15 vehicles destroyed; 1 fighter jet destroyed
- 3 civilians killed, 96 wounded

The Israeli military conducted a large cross-border assault, codenamed Operation Shredder, on 13 November 1966 on the Jordanian-controlled West Bank village of Samu. It was the largest Israeli military operation since the 1956 Suez Crisis and is considered to have been a contributing factor to the outbreak of the Six-Day War in 1967.

Israel stated that the attack was in response to a Palestinian fedayeen guerrilla land mine attack two days earlier near the West Bank border, which killed three Israeli soldiers on a border patrol, purportedly from Jordanian territory. Prior to the cross-border attack, Jordan had been conducting an active campaign to curb insurgent activities from Palestinian fedayeen groups such as Fatah since 1965.

The handling of the incident was widely criticised in Israeli political and military circles, and the United Nations responded with United Nations Security Council Resolution 228, censuring Israel for "violating the United Nations Charter and the General Armistice Agreement."

== Background ==
Since 1963, King Hussein of Jordan had been meeting clandestinely with Israeli Foreign Minister, Golda Meir, and Prime Minister's deputy, Abba Eban, concerning peace and mutually secure borders. Hussein later stated that during one of his meetings with Israeli representatives: "I told them I could not absorb a serious retaliatory raid, and they accepted the logic of this and promised there would never be one." On the night of 11 November, an Israeli border patrol vehicle carrying policemen drove over a mine near the Israeli-Jordanian border, killing three and wounding six; the mine was reportedly planted by Palestinian guerrillas from Fatah. On 12 November, King Hussein sent a letter of condolence to Israeli Prime Minister Levi Eshkol, via the U.S. embassy in Amman. From there it was sent to U.S. ambassador Walworth Barbour at the embassy in Tel Aviv; instead of forwarding it to the prime minister, he left the letter on his desk – assuming it was not important and there was no rush. According to another version of the story, the letter reached Barbour on the 11th (a Friday), but he delayed passing it on due to the coming Sabbath. Early on the morning of 13 November, King Hussein received an unsolicited message from his Israeli contacts stating that Israel had no intention of attacking Jordan. Early the same day also, the Israeli military mobilized 3,000–4,000 troops, and sent about 600 of these, with 60 half-tracks and 11 tanks, across the border into the Jordanian-controlled West Bank.

== Prelude to the IDF cross-border attack ==
Israel's rationale for the cross-border assault was to avenge three Israeli deaths in a land mine incident on 12 November 1966, based on the Israeli allegation that the attack had originated from Jordan. A further goal in the operation was to demolish houses in Palestinian villages located south of Hebron as a show of force to preempt future Palestinian violence.

The Israeli rationale for the attack on Samu has often been questioned. For example, Colonel (ret.) Jan Mühren, a Dutch UN observer in the West Bank who patrolled Samu during this period, gave an interview to the Dutch current affairs program Nova on the 40th anniversary of the Six-Day War where he denied the Israeli charges regarding Samu. He said "Had the people from this village anything to do with the attack on Israel – Well no. Not just from this village but also not from the entire West Bank. ... only western officers operated here and we did patrols. The situation was completely calm." However, the attack against the Israeli patrol had occurred two days earlier, although the purported Jordanian origin of the perpetrators was never independently investigated. Jordan immediately lodged a formal complaint with the UN Security Council.

Although the Israeli goal was retribution for the Fatah land mine incident, purportedly having originated from Jordanian-controlled territory, Israel's first act was to cross the 1949 Armistice line and to destroy a Jordanian police post at Rujm El Madfa. In addition to the large-scale destruction in Samu village, the Israeli forces also damaged other villages.

In a report by the Arab League, it was assumed that the main goal of this attack was to test the efficiency of what was called the United Arab Command, and see if any other Arab country such as Egypt or Syria would come to the aid of Jordan. The report also assumes that this battle was in preparation for the Six-Day War.

== Operation Shredder ==
Israel mobilised a force of around 3,000–4,000 soldiers, backed by tanks and aircraft, in the attack code-named Operation Shredder. The force was divided into a large reserve force, which remained on the Israeli side of the border, and two attack forces, which crossed into the Jordanian-controlled West Bank. In what was justified as a retaliatory attack against Fatah, ground troops moved into the village of Rujm al-Madfa located just southwest of Hebron, and destroyed its police station. From there, the larger force of eight Centurion tanks followed by 400 paratroopers mounted in 40 open-topped half-tracks and 60 engineers in 10 more half-tracks headed for Samu. Meanwhile, the smaller force of three tanks and 100 paratroopers and engineers in 10 half-tracks headed toward two smaller villages, Khirbet el-Markas and Khirbet Jimba. When the larger force entered Samu, most of the town's residents responded to orders by the IDF to gather in the town square. Sappers from the 35th paratrooper brigades then dynamited numerous buildings within and near the village; reports of the total number of houses destroyed range from 40 to 125 (IDF and United Nations estimates, respectively). In addition the UN reported the destruction of the village medical clinic, a 6-classroom school and a workshop, plus damage to one mosque and 28 houses.

The 48th Infantry Battalion of the Jordanian Army, commanded by Major Asad Ghanma, encountered the Israeli forces north-west of Samu. Two companies of the Hitteen Infantry Brigade (لواء المشاة حطين) also approached from the north-east; these were composed of roughly 100 men and 20 convoy vehicles, and commanded by Col. Bahjat al-Muhaisen (العميد الركن بهجت المحيسن). Believing that Israel was attacking Yattah, another village south of Hebron, rather than Samu, al-Muhaisen ordered his forces to advance towards Yattah. However, the road to Yattah passed directly through Samu, and as the Jordanian column entered the village, Israeli forces opened fire on it, destroying 15 of its 20 vehicles and forcing the Jordanians to retreat and regroup.

Eight Jordanian Hawker Hunter jets were scrambled at Mafraq Airbase and attacked Israeli forces to relieve pressure on their own troops, but were met by a force of four Israeli Mirage 3 jets. In the air battle that followed, a Jordanian plane was shot down and the pilot was killed, and an Israeli plane was damaged and forced to land. Its pilot was severely injured. Col. Muheisen's column and a platoon of Jordanian soldiers armed with two 106 mm recoilless rifles launched a counterattack, and a three-hour battle ensued, after which the Israelis withdrew across the border.

During the battle, sixteen Jordanian military personnel (15 soldiers and one pilot) were killed, and fifty-four other soldiers were wounded, including Colonel al-Muhaisen. One Israeli soldier was killed; Col. Yoav Shaham, the commander of the Israeli paratrooper battalion. Ten other Israeli soldiers were wounded. Three local civilians were also killed.

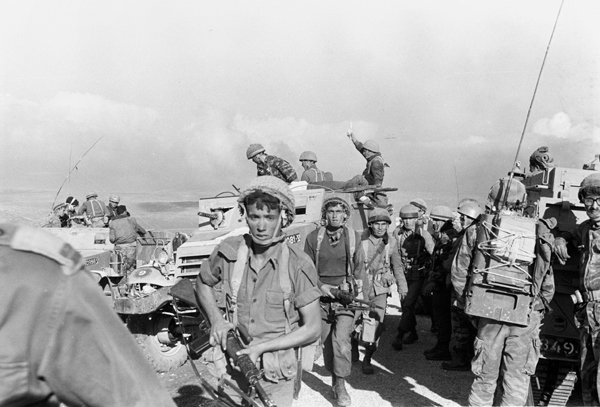
Israeli army attack on Samu

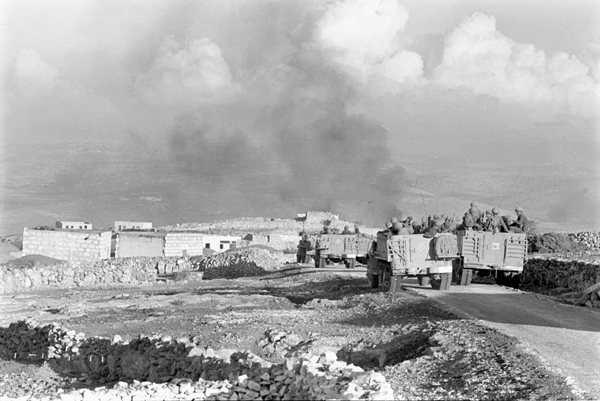
Israeli army attack on Samu

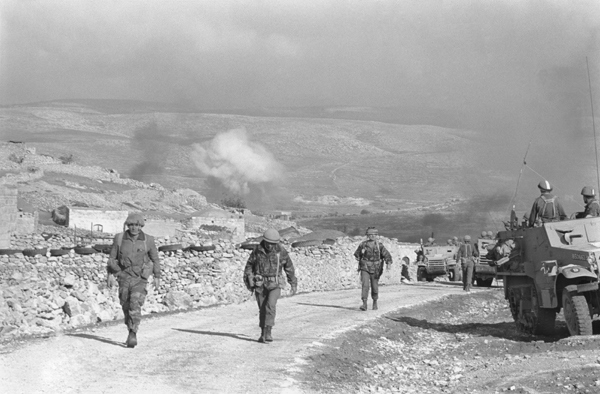
Samu 13 November 1966

== Aftermath ==
Some authors consider the Battle of Samu to have been a contributing factor to the outbreak of the Six-Day War in 1967. Norman Finkelstein believed that it marked the onset of the crisis which culminated in the June 1967 war. Clea Bunch wrote that "the attack on Samu was the first link in a lengthy chain of miscalculations, false perceptions and high stakes gambles that steadily led to war".

In Jordan, following the battle, King Hussein was faced with a storm of criticism for failing to protect Samu, emanating from Jordanians, as well as from Palestinians and neighboring Arab countries. Riots spread throughout the West Bank demanding the king be overthrown. Four Palestinians were killed by Jordanian police as a result of the riots. On 20 November, Hussein ordered nationwide military service.

Egyptian and Syrian radio also verbally attacked Jordan accusing King Hussein of collaborating with the CIA to plot an overthrow of the Ba'ath Party in Syria. Following the Palestinian demonstrations against him, King Hussein accused Nasser of using the presence of the United Nations Emergency Force on Egypt's border with Israel, as an excuse for failing to take action against Israel. As Palestinians rioted in Hebron, Nablus, Jerusalem on the West Bank and Irbid in Jordan, the Palestine Liberation Organization warned all Jordanian ministers to resign by noon on 26 November.

In Israel, angered opposition parties demanded to know why Israel attacked Jordan rather than Syria, which was the guerrilla home base. In a special parliamentary debate, Prime Minister Eshkol listed 14 major acts of sabotage carried out from Jordan in the past year, climaxed by the land-mine explosion that killed three Israeli troops on 12 November. Eshkol said: "It is regrettable that this particular act of aggression came from Jordan." But since it did, he had picked Jordan as his target. "No country where the saboteurs find shelter and through whose territory they pass on their way to Israel can be exempt from responsibility." What Eshkol left unsaid was his certainty that, with the so-called Arab unity being what it was, Jordan would find itself with far less Arab support than Syria, which was much closer to Egypt's Gamal Abdel Nasser. Jordan's Arab partners did wait until the Israelis had withdrawn before making indignant vows of support.

Two days after the attack, in a memo to President Johnson, his National Security Advisor Walt Rostow wrote "I'm not suggesting our usual admonition against retaliation. We'll maintain that posture ... but retaliation is not the point in this case. This 3,000-man raid with tanks and planes was out of all proportion to the provocation and was aimed at the wrong target. In hitting Jordan so hard, the Israelis have done a great deal of damage to our interests and to their own: They've wrecked a good system of tacit cooperation between Hussein and the Israelis. ... They've undercut Hussein. We've spent $500 million to shore him up as a stabilizing factor on Israel's longest border and vis-à-vis Syria and Iraq. Israel's attack increases the pressure on him to counterattack not only from the more radical Arab governments and from the Palestinians in Jordan but also from the Army, which is his main source of support and may now press for a chance to recoup its Sunday losses. ... They've set back progress toward a long term accommodation with the Arabs. ... They may have persuaded the Syrians that Israel didn't dare attack Soviet-protected Syria but could attack US-backed Jordan with impunity. It's important that we strengthen the hand of those within the Israeli Government who feel this is not the proper way to handle the problem. Even members of the Israeli military now doubt that retaliation will stop the cross-border raids, though they see no better solution."

On 16 November 1966 the UN Security Council convened to hear the Jordanian complaint and invited an Israeli response. After hearing both sides the UK representative responded:

... my delegation can find no justification whatsoever for the calculated, admitted and wholly disproportionate act of military reprisal committed by Israel against Jordan on 13 November. Mr. President, reference has been made, in the letter of the representative of Israel to you of 12 November [S/7584], to a mining incident on that day which cost the lives of three occupants of an Israel army vehicle and injured six others. Certainly, my delegation deplores that incident and regrets the loss of life. But even if it could be demonstrated to us that Jordan had any direct responsibility for this and other incidents, we could not possibly condone the Israel attack. It was a fully planned attack, mounted by infantry and armored forces and supported by aircraft, and attack on Jordanian villages in the area of Hebron. This action constituted a flagrant violation of our Charter and of the Israel-Jordan Armistice Agreement. It has done nothing to enhance the security of Israel citizens or the reputation of Israel.

The United States representative followed with:

Immediately after learning of the incident now before the Council, on Sunday morning, I issued a statement on behalf of my Government expressing our strong disapproval of the large-scale Israel military action on Jordanian territory on 13 November. ... The United States then condemned this raid and condemns it now, deeming it in clear violation of solemn obligations undertaken by Israel in the General Armistice Agreements. And what is, of course, most deplorable is (the) tragic toll in human lives of this inexcusable action. ... the Government of Israel carried out, with support of tanks, armored vehicles, heavy weapons and aircraft, a raid into Jordan the nature of which, and the consequences of which in human lives and destruction, far surpassed the cumulative total of the various acts of terrorism conducted against the frontiers of Israel. ... this large-scale military action cannot be justified, explained away or excused by the incidents which preceded it and in which the Government of Jordan has not been implicated.

On 18 November, the Security Council requested that the existing United Nations Military Observers prepare a report of their findings regarding the incident; by the Secretary General concerning incident of 13 November 1966 in Jordan. This was presented to the Security Council a few days later. In a rare agreement, the Soviet Union joined the U.S., France and Great Britain and condemned the Israeli attack. U.S. Ambassador Arthur Goldberg termed the raid "inexcusable" and pushed for a formal U.N. resolution censuring Israel. On 25 November the United Nations Security Council adopted Resolution 228 unanimously deploring "the loss of life and heavy damage to property resulting from the action of the Government of Israel on 13 November 1966"; censuring "Israel for this large-scale military action in violation of the United Nations Charter and of the General Armistice Agreement between Israel and Jordan"; and emphasising "to Israel that actions of military reprisal cannot be tolerated and that, if they are repeated, the Security Council will have to consider further and more effective steps as envisaged in the Charter to ensure against the repetition of such acts."

Some months later and just weeks before the Six-Day War, the U.S. ambassador in Amman, Findley Burns, reported in a telegram to the State Department that Hussein had expressed the opinion in a conversation the day before that,

if Israel launched another Samu-scale attack against Jordan he would have no alternative but to retaliate or face an internal revolt. If Jordan retaliates, asked Hussein, would not this give Israel a pretext to occupy and hold Jordanian or Occupied territory? Or, said Hussein, Israel might instead of a hit-and-run type attack simply occupy and hold territory in the first instance. He said he could not exclude these possibilities from his calculations and urged us not to do so even if we felt them considerably less than likely.

David Ben-Gurion later criticized the raid, arguing that it weakened King Hussein's position counter to Israel's interests. Moshe Dayan was also critical. He believed that the Samu Operation should have been directed at the Syrians.

== See also ==
- Arab–Israeli conflict
- Battle of Karameh
- Israeli–Palestinian conflict
- Qibya massacre

== Bibliography ==
- Shemesh, Moshe (2002). "'The IDF raid on Samu': the turning-point in Jordan's relations with Israel and the West Bank Palestinians". Israel Studies. 7 (1): 139–166. doi:10.1353/is.2002.0008.
- Ben-Yehûdā, Ḥemdā and Sandler, Shmuel (2002). The Arab-Israeli Conflict Transformed: Fifty Years of Interstate and Ethnic Crises. SUNY Press. ISBN 0-7914-5245-X.
- Bowen, Jeremy (2003). Six Days: How the 1967 War Shaped the Middle East. London: Simon & Schuster. ISBN 0-7432-3095-7.
- Brenchley, Frank (1989). Britain and the Middle East: An Economic History 1945–87. I.B.Tauris. ISBN 1-870915-07-0.
- Bunch, Clea Lutz (2008). "Strike at Samu: Jordan, Israel, the United States, and the Origins of the Six-Day War". Diplomatic History. 32 (1): 55–76. doi:10.1111/j.1467-7709.2007.00677.x.
- Hussein of Jordan (1969). My "War" with Israel. London: Peter Owen. ISBN 0-7206-0310-2.
- Mayhew, Christopher and Adams, Michael (2006). Publish It Not: The Middle East Cover Up. Signal Books. ISBN 1-904955-19-3.
- Oren, Michael (2002). Six Days of War. Oxford University Press. ISBN 0-19-515174-7.
- Prittie, Terence (1969). Eshkol of Israel: The Man and the Nation. London, Museum Press. ISBN 0-273-40475-X.
- Shalom, Zaki (2006). Ben-Gurion's Political Struggles, 1963–67: A Lion in Winter. London: Routledge. ISBN 0-7146-5652-6.
