= Ajlun offensive =

Part of the Black September conflict

- Part of the Black September
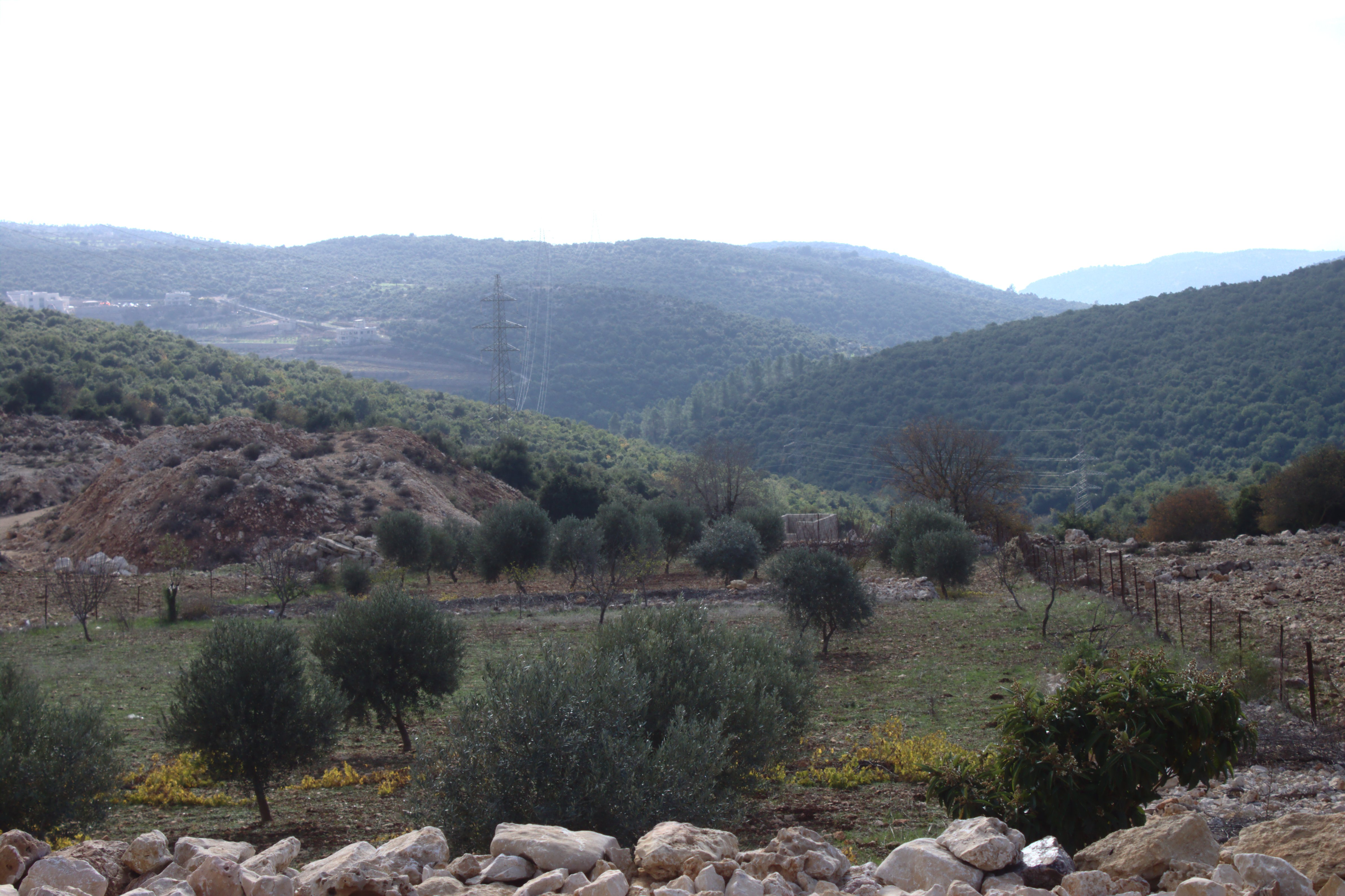
- Countryside in Ajlun
Date	12–23 July 1971 (1 week and 4 days)
Location	Ajlun, Jordan
Result	Jordanian victory

Belligerents
Jordan	PLO

Commanders and leaders
Wasfi Tal; Habis Majali	Khalil al-Wazir; Abu Ali Iyad †

Units involved
Jordanian Armed Forces: Royal Jordanian Army; Royal Jordanian Air Force; "Popular Army"	Al-'Asifah

Strength
30,000	c. 2,500

Casualties and losses
c. 150–200	c. 200–250 killed c. 2,300 captured

The Ajlun offensive, also known as the Battle of the Scrubland, was a major military engagement between Jordan and the Palestine Liberation Organization during the Black September conflict in 1971. Jordanian troops encircled thousands of Palestinian fedayeen and forced them to evacuate the area.

== Background ==
In September 1970, heavy fighting erupted between Jordanian forces and the Palestinian fedayeen. At the urging of other Arab heads of state, Jordanian king Hussein bin Talal and Palestinian leader Yasser Arafat signed a ceasefire agreement in Cairo, Egypt, on 27 September 1970. The agreement called for the rapid withdrawal of Palestinian guerrilla forces from all Jordanian cities and towns, and their relocation to positions "appropriate" for continuing the battle with Israel. It also called for the release of prisoners held by both sides. Most of PLO leadership decided that staying in Jordan was no longer an option, and decided to disperse the movement to other countries. A number of PLO commanders, most prominently Abu Ali Iyad, disagreed and instead decided to relocate to the rough countryside in northwestern Jordan to keep fighting.

From December 1970, the Royal Jordanian Army began a "creeping offensive" to push the fedayeen out of their positions north and west of Amman as well as cut off their foreign supply. As the PLO's military position detoriated, Arafat fled into exile in Syria to rebuild his forces. Meanwhile, the Jordanian prepared to destroy the last PLO holdouts in Jordan. In April 1971, Jordanian Prime Minister Wasfi Tal ordered the PLO to relocate all its bases from Amman to the forests between Ajloun and Jerash. The fedayeen initially intended to resist the order, but they were hopelessly outnumbered and outgunned.

== Jordanian offensive ==
On 12 July 1971, the Jordanian government ordered the trapped Palestinian fedayeen to evacuate Tal al-Aqra, the strategic mountain at the heart of the Ajlun stronghold. The local PLO field command, including Abu Ali Iyad, rejected the demand. Journalist and researcher Patrick Seale argued that the decision to resist at Ajlun was a "suicide mission", as the fedayeen had no capabilities to resist the Jordanian armored forces on open terrain.

On the morning of 13 July, the Jordanian Armed Forces initiated a large-scale offensive against the 2,500 militants of the Ajlun stronghold with intensive artillery bombardment, reinforced by aerial attacks. The Jordanians then began to advance on fedayeen positions from three sides, using an infantry division, a tank brigade, two commando battalions and 10,000 militiamen of the "Popular Army". In addition, three more Jordanian battalions attacked the about 500 PLO fighters still based in the Jordan Valley. The fighting was brutal and PLO militants reported that Jordanian tanks drove over wounded fedayeen.

By 14 July, the Jordanians held most of the battlefield. On the morning of 16 July, the Jordanian military announced that it had taken control of the whole area after the killing of about 200-250 fedayeen fighters, suffering about 150-200 losses. About 500 fedayeen managed to withdraw from the area and reach neighbouring Syria. The Jordanians captured about 2,300 fedayeen. About 100-200 PLO militants preferred to cross the Jordan River to surrender to Israeli forces rather than to the Jordanians. As his forces were overrun, Abu Ali Iyad sent a man with a letter out of the Ajlun pocket to the PLO leadership; in the message, he bitterly condemned his superiors for abandoning the fight and declared that "we will die on our feet rather than kneel".

Mopping-up operations continued for two days, as the Jordanians hunted for PLO stragglers. Meanwhile, the militants executed a number of Jordanian officers who had defected to them in September 1970. On 23 July, Abu Ali Iyad was reportedly killed around Ajlun. His corpse was never found.

== Aftermath ==
Following the destruction of the Ajlun holdout, King Hussein declared in a press conference that Jordanian sovereignty had been restored. The remnants of Abu Ali Iyad's force continued to hold him in high regard and vowed to avenge him; one of them murdered Wasfi Tal in November 1971.

International allies of the PLO barely reacted to the operation. However, China condemned the offensive and sent a shipment of tanks and other weapons to strengthen the PLO forces in Lebanon and Syria.
