= Black September =

1970–1971 conflict in Jordan

- Part of the Arab Cold War
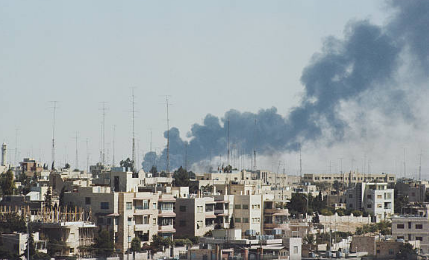
- Smoke rises over Amman during clashes between the Jordanian military and the Palestinian fedayeen, 1 October 1970
Date	6 September 1970 – 23 July 1971 (10 months, 2 weeks and 3 days)
Location	Jordan
Result	Jordanian victory: Syrian invasion repelled; Palestinian militants expelled to Lebanon; Formation of the Black September Organization

Belligerents
Palestine Liberation Organization; Fatah; Popular Front for the Liberation of Palestine; Democratic Front for the Liberation of Palestine; Ba'athist Syria (until November 1970)	Jordan

Commanders and leaders
Yasser Arafat; Abu Jihad; Abu Ali Iyad †; George Habash; Nayef Hawatmeh; Salah Jadid	Hussein; Habis Majali; Zeid bin Shaker; Wasfi Tal

Strength
(Palestine Liberation Organization) 15,000–40,000 (Syria) 10,000 (Syria) 300 tanks (two armoured, one mechanized infantry brigade)	(Jordan) 65,000–74,000

Casualties and losses
(Palestine Liberation Organization) 3,400 killed (Syria) 600 casualties (Syria) 120 tanks and APCs lost	(Jordan) 537 killed

Black September (Arabic: أيلول الأسود, romanized: Aylūl al-ʾAswad), also known as the Jordanian Civil War, was an armed conflict between Jordan, led by King Hussein, and the Palestine Liberation Organization (PLO), led by chairman Yasser Arafat. The main phase of the fighting took place between 16 and 27 September 1970, though certain aspects of the conflict continued until 17 July 1971.

After the 1967 Six-Day War, Palestinian fedayeen guerrillas relocated to Jordan and stepped up their attacks against Israel and what had become the Israeli-occupied West Bank. They were headquartered at the Jordanian border town of Karameh, which Israel targeted during the Battle of Karameh in 1968, leading to a surge of Arab support for the fedayeen. The PLO's strength grew, and by early 1970, leftist groups within the PLO began calling for the overthrow of Jordan's Hashemite monarchy, leading to violent clashes in June 1970. Hussein hesitated to oust them from the country, but continued PLO activities in Jordan culminated in the Dawson's Field hijackings of 6 September 1970. This involved the Popular Front for the Liberation of Palestine (PFLP) seizing three civilian passenger flights and forcing their landing in the Jordanian city of Zarqa, where they took foreign nationals as hostages and blew up the planes in front of international press. Hussein saw this as the last straw and ordered the Jordanian Army to take action.

On 17 September 1970, the Jordanian Army surrounded cities with a significant PLO presence, including Amman and Irbid, and began targeting fedayeen posts that were operating from Palestinian refugee camps. The next day, 10,000 Syrian troops bearing Palestine Liberation Army (PLA) markings began an invasion by advancing towards Irbid, which the fedayeen had occupied and declared to be a "liberated" city. On 22 September, the Syrians withdrew from Irbid after suffering heavy losses to a coordinated aerial–ground offensive by the Jordanians. Mounting pressure from other Arab countries, such as Iraq, led Hussein to halt his offensive. On 13 October, he signed an agreement with Arafat to regulate the fedayeen's presence in Jordan. However, the Jordanian military attacked again in January 1971, and the fedayeen were driven out of the cities, until 2,000 surrendered after they were encircled during the Ajlun offensive on 23 July, formally marking the end of the conflict.

Jordan allowed the fedayeen to relocate to Lebanon via Syria, where they later became involved in the Lebanese Civil War. The Palestinian Black September Organization was founded after the conflict to carry out attacks against Jordanian authorities in response to the fedayeen's expulsion; their most notable attack was the assassination of Jordanian prime minister Wasfi Tal in 1971, as he had commanded parts of the military operations against the fedayeen. The following year, the organization shifted its focus to attacking Israeli targets and carried out the Munich massacre against Israeli athletes. Though the events of Black September did not reflect a Jordanian–Palestinian divide, as there were Jordanians and Palestinians on both sides of the conflict, it paved the way for such a divide to emerge after the conflict.

== History ==
=== Background ===
==== Palestinians in Jordan ====
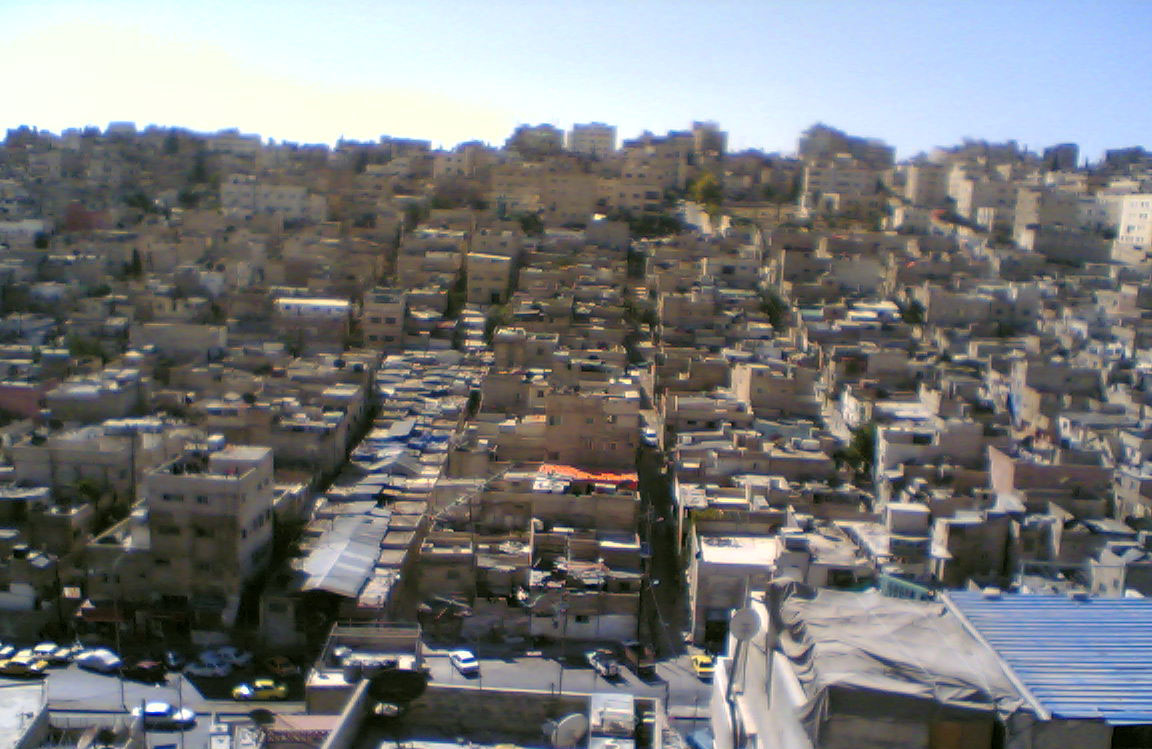
View of Jabal Al-Hussein Palestinian refugee camp in Amman

After the Jordanian annexation of the West Bank in 1950, it conferred its citizenship on the West Bank Palestinians. The combined population of the West Bank and Jordan consisted of two-thirds Palestinians (one-third in the West Bank and one-third in the East Bank) and one-third Jordanians. Jordan provided Palestinians with seats amounting to half the parliament, and Palestinians enjoyed equal opportunities in all sectors of the state. This demographic change influenced Jordanian politics.

King Hussein considered that the Palestinian problem would remain the country's overriding national security issue; he feared an independent West Bank under PLO administration would threaten the autonomy of his Hashemite kingdom. The Palestinian factions were supported vicariously by many Arab governments, most notably Egypt's President Gamal Abdel Nasser, who gave them political support.

The Palestinian nationalist organization Fatah started organizing cross-border attacks against Israel in January 1965, often drawing severe Israeli reprisals upon Jordan. The Samu incident launched by Israel on 13 November 1966 was one such reprisal, taking place after three Israeli soldiers were killed by a Fatah landmine. The Israeli assault on the Jordanian-controlled West Bank town of As-Samu inflicted heavy casualties on Jordan. Israeli writer Avi Shlaim argued that Israel's disproportionate retaliation exacted revenge on the wrong party, as Israeli leaders knew from their interaction with Hussein that he was doing everything he could to prevent such attacks. Hussein, who felt he had been betrayed by the Israelis, drew fierce local criticism because of this incident. It is thought that this contributed to his decision to join Egypt and Syria's war against Israel in 1967. In June 1967 Israel captured the West Bank from Jordan during the Six-Day War.

==== PLO's growing strength after the Battle of Karameh ====
After Jordan lost the West Bank, Fatah (under the PLO) stepped up their guerrilla attacks against Israel from Jordanian soil, making the border town of Karameh their headquarters. On 18 March 1968, an Israeli school bus was blown up by a mine near Be'er Ora in the Arava, killing two adults and wounding ten children—the 38th Fatah operation in little more than three months. On 21 March, Israel Defense Forces (IDF) units entered Jordan and launched a reprisal attack on Karameh that developed into a full-scale battle that lasted a day. The PLO suffered some 200 casualties and another 150 taken prisoner; 40–84 Jordanian soldiers were also killed. Israeli losses stood at around 30 killed and 69–161 wounded, and they also left behind several vehicles.

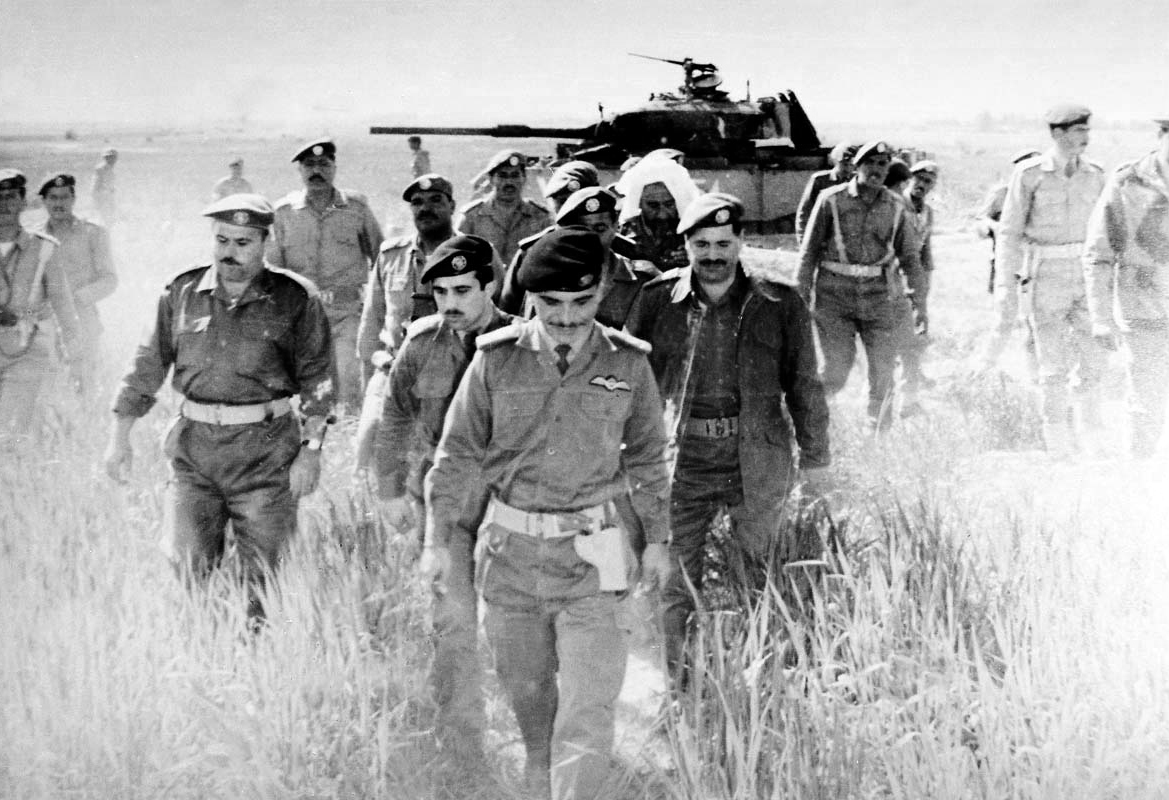
King Hussein after checking an abandoned Israeli tank on 21 March 1968 during the Battle of Karameh. The perceived joint Palestinian-Jordanian victory led to an upsurge in support for the fedayeen in Jordan.

Both sides declared victory: Israel had fulfilled its objective of destroying the Karameh camp, but failed to capture Arafat; while Jordan and the PLO had exacted relatively heavy Israeli casualties. Although the Palestinians had limited success in inflicting Israeli casualties, King Hussein let them take the credit. The fedayeen used the battle's wide acclaim and recognition in the Arab world to establish their national claims. The Karameh operation also highlighted the vulnerability of bases close to the Jordan River, so the PLO moved them farther into the mountains. Further Israeli attacks targeted Palestinian militants residing among the Jordanian civilian population, giving rise to friction between Jordanians and guerrillas.

Palestinians and Arabs generally considered the battle a psychological victory over the IDF, which had been seen as "invincible" until then, and recruitment into guerrilla units soared. Fatah reported that 5,000 volunteers had applied to join within 48 hours of the events at Karameh. By late March, there were nearly 20,000 fedayeen in Jordan. Iraq and Syria offered training programs for several thousand guerrillas. The Arab states of the Persian Gulf, led by Kuwait, raised money for them through a 5% tax on the salaries of their tens of thousands of resident Palestinian workers, and a fund drive in Lebanon raised $500,000 from Beirut alone. The Palestinian organizations also began to guarantee a lifetime support for the families of all guerrillas killed in action. Within a year after the battle, Fatah had branches in about eighty countries. After the battle, Fatah gained control of the PLO in Egypt.

Palestinian fedayeen from Syria and Lebanon started to converge on Jordan, mostly in Amman. In Palestinian enclaves and refugee camps in Jordan, the police and army were losing their authority. The Wehdat and Al-Hussein refugee camps came to be referred to as "independent republics" and the fedayeen established administrative autonomy by establishing local government under the control of uniformed PLO militants—setting up checkpoints and attempting to extort "taxes" from civilians.

==== Seven-point agreement ====
In early November 1968, the Jordanian army attacked a fedayeen group named "Al-Nasr" (meaning victory) after the group had attacked Jordanian police. Not all Palestinians were supportive of Al-Nasr's actions, but the Jordanian response was meant to send a message that there would be consequences for challenging the government's authority. Immediately after the incident, a seven-point agreement was reached between King Hussein and Palestinian organizations that restrained unlawful and illegal fedayeen behavior against the Jordanian government.

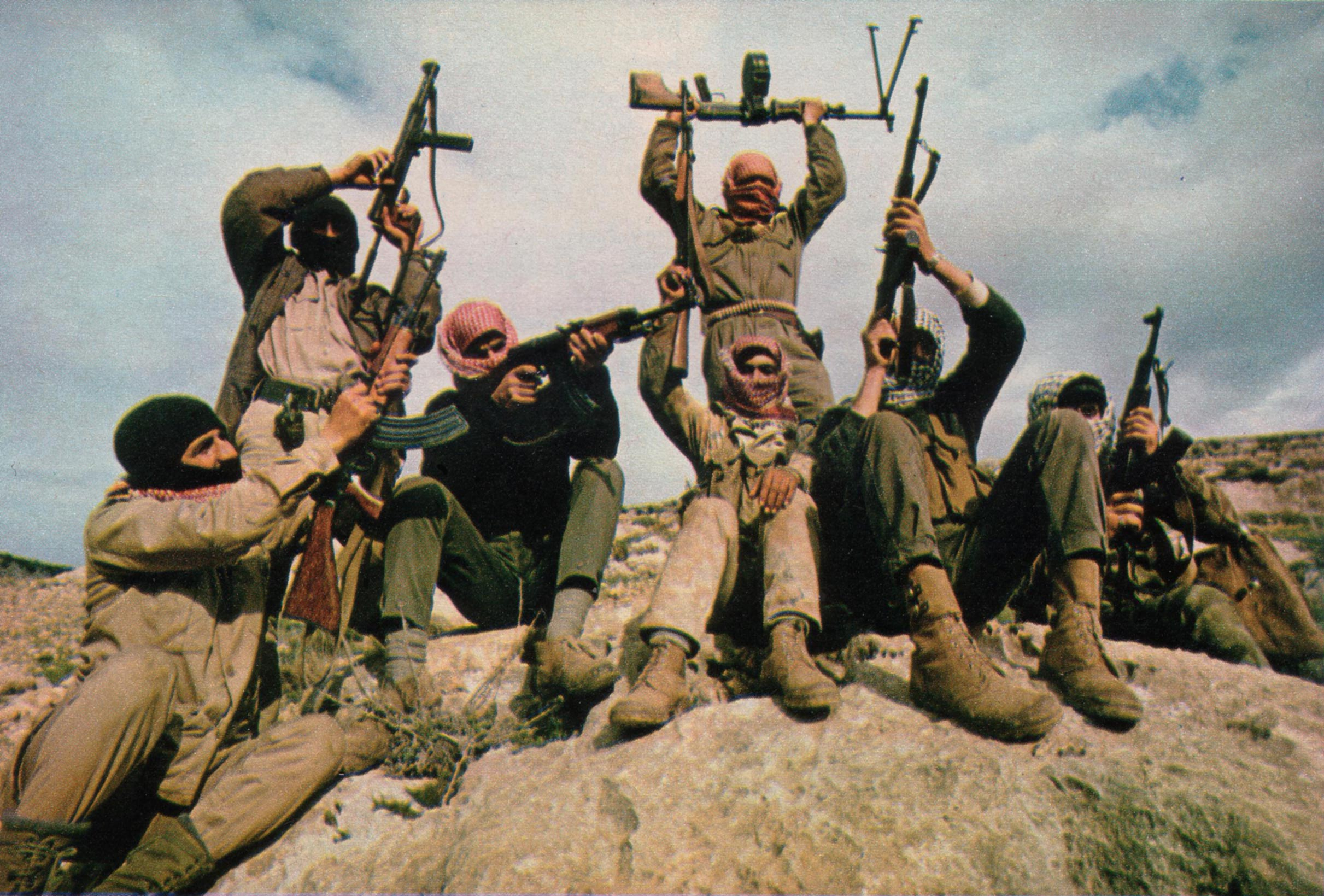
Fedayeen of the Popular Front for the Liberation of Palestine (PFLP) in Jordan, early 1969

The PLO would not live up to the agreement, and came to be seen more and more as a state within a state in Jordan. Fatah's Yasser Arafat replaced Ahmad Shukeiri as the PLO's leader in February 1969. Discipline in the different Palestinian groups was poor, and the PLO had no central power to control the different groups. A situation developed of fedayeen groups rapidly spawning, merging, and splintering, sometimes trying to behave radically in order to attract recruits. Hussein went to the United States in March 1969 for talks with Richard Nixon, the new American president. He argued for Israel's adherence to United Nations Security Council Resolution 242, in which it was required to return territories it had occupied in 1967 in return for peace. Palestinian factions were suspicious of Hussein as this meant the withdrawal of his policy of forceful resistance towards Israel. These suspicions were further heightened by Washington's claim that Hussein would be able to liquidate the fedayeen movement in his country upon resolution of the conflict.

Fatah favored not intervening in the internal affairs of other Arab countries. However, although it assumed the leadership of the PLO, more radical left-wing Palestinian movements refused to abide by that policy. By 1970, the Popular Front for the Liberation of Palestine (PFLP) led by George Habash and the Democratic Front for the Liberation of Palestine (DFLP) led by Nayef Hawatmeh, began to openly question the legitimacy of the Hashemite monarchy, and called for its overthrow and replacement with a revolutionary regime. Other radical groups included the Syrian Ba'ath's As-Sa'iqa, and the Iraqi Ba'ath's Arab Liberation Front: these saw Hussein as "a puppet of Western imperialism", "a reactionary", and "a Zionist tool". They claimed that the road to Tel Aviv passed through Amman, which they sought to transform into the Hanoi of the Arab world. They also stirred up conservative and religious feelings with provocative anti-religious statements and actions, such as putting up Marxist and Leninist slogans on mosque walls.

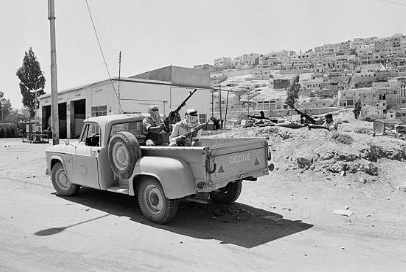
PFLP patrol in Amman, 12 June 1970

According to Shlaim, their growing power was accompanied by growing arrogance and insolence. He quotes an observer describing the PLO in Jordan,

They drove noisily around Amman in jeeps with loaded weapons, like an army of occupation; they extorted financial contributions from individuals, sometimes foreigners, in their homes and in public places; they disregarded routine traffic regulations, failed to register and license their vehicles, and refused to stop at army checkpoints; they boasted about their role of destiny against Israel and belittled the worth of the army. Their very presence in Amman, far from the battlefield, seemed like a challenge to the regime.

Palestinians claimed there were numerous agents provocateurs from Jordanian or other security services present among the fedayeen, deliberately trying to upset political relations and provide justification for a crackdown. There were frequent kidnappings and acts of violence against civilians: Chief of the Jordanian Royal Court (and subsequently Prime Minister) Zaid Rifai claimed that in one extreme instance "the fedayeen killed a soldier, beheaded him, and played football with his head in the area where he used to live".

==== Ten-point edict and June confrontations ====
The situation placed Hussein in a severe dilemma: if he used force to oust the fedayeen, he would alienate himself from the Palestinians in the country and the Arab World. However, if he refused to act to strike back at the fedayeen, he would lose the respect of Jordanians, and more seriously, that of the army, the backbone of the regime, which already started to pressure Hussein to act against them. In February 1970, King Hussein visited Egyptian President Nasser in Cairo and won his support for taking a tougher stance against the fedayeen. Nasser also agreed to influence the fedayeen to desist from undermining Hussein's regime. Upon his return, he published a ten-point edict restricting activities of the Palestinian organizations, which included prohibition of the following: carrying arms publicly, storing ammunitions in villages, and holding demonstrations and meetings without prior governmental consent. The fedayeen reacted violently to these efforts aimed at curbing their power, which led Hussein to freeze the new regulation; he also acquiesced to fedayeen demands of dismissing the perceived anti-Palestinian interior minister Muhammad Al-Kailani. Hussein's policy of giving concessions to the fedayeen was to gain time, but Western newspapers started floating sensationalized stories that Hussein was losing control over Jordan and that he might abdicate soon.

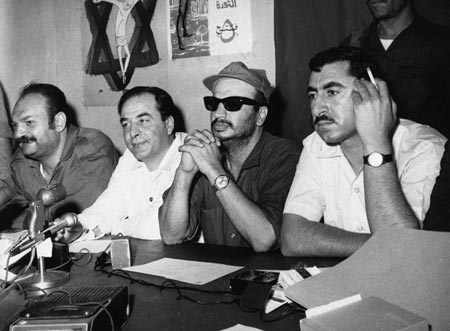
PLO leaders Yasser Arafat, Nayef Hawatmeh and Kamal Nasser speaking at a press conference in Amman after the June events, 1970

Libya, Saudi Arabia and Kuwait, who were openly supporting the fedayeen, sent Jordan financial subsidies, placing Hussein in a difficult position. Hussein saw no external forces to support him other than the United States and Israel, but that would act as fuel for fedayeen propaganda against him. On 17 February 1970, the American embassy in Tel Aviv relayed three questions from Hussein to Israel asking about Israel's stance if Jordan chose to confront the fedayeen. Israel replied positively to Hussein, and committed that they would not take advantage if Jordan withdrew its troops from the borders for a potential confrontation.

Israeli artillery and airforce attacked Irbid on 3 June as reprisal for a fedayeen attack on Beit She'an, killing one soldier, as well as killing seven and injuring twenty-six civilians. The Jordanian army retaliated and shelled Tiberias for the first time in 22 years; Hussein ordered the shelling but realized it was the start of a dangerous cycle of violence. Consequently, he requested, through the American embassy in Amman, a ceasefire with the Israelis to buy time so that he could take strong measures against the fedayeen. The message to Israel stated that "the Jordanian government was doing everything it could to prevent fedayeen rocket attacks on Israel. The King deeply regrets the rocket attacks. Jordan Army under orders to shoot to kill any fedayeen attempting to fire rockets and fedayeen leaders had been told again evening of 3 June that violators would be shot on sight". Israel accepted Hussein's request following pressure from the Americans.

We had thousands of incidents of breaking the law, of attacking people. It was a very unruly state of affairs in the country and I continued to try. I went to Egypt, I called in the Arabs to help in any way they could – particularly as some of them were sponsoring some of these movements in one form or another – but without much success, and towards the end I felt I was losing control. In the last six months leading up to the crisis the army began to rebel. I had to spend most of my time running to those units that had left their positions and were going to the capital, or to some other part of Jordan, to sort out people who were attacking their families or attacking their soldiers on leave. I think that the gamble was probably the army would fracture along Palestinian-Jordanian lines. That never happened, thank God.

— Hussein later recalling the events

In the summer of 1970, the Jordanian army was on the verge of losing its patience with the fedayeen. After a provocation from the fedayeen, a tank battalion moved from the Jordan Valley without orders from Amman, intending to retaliate against them. It took the personal intervention of the King and that of the 3rd Armored Division commander Sharif Shaker, who blocked the road with their cars, to stop its onslaught.

Fighting broke out again between the fedayeen and the army in Zarqa on 7 June. Two days later, the fedayeen opened fire on the General Intelligence Directorate's (mukhabarat) headquarters. Hussein went to visit the mukhabarat headquarters after the incident, but his motorcade came under heavy fedayeen fire, killing one of his guards. Bedouin units of the army retaliated for the assassination attempt against their king by shelling Al-Wehdat and Al-Hussein camps, which escalated into a conflict that lasted three days. An Israeli army meeting deliberated on events in Jordan; according to the director of Israel's Military Intelligence, there were around 2,000 fedayeen in Amman armed with mortars and Katyusha rockets. Hussein's advisors were divided: some were urging him to finish the job, while others were calling for restraint as victory could only be accomplished at the cost of thousands of lives, which to them was unacceptable. Hussein halted the fighting, and the three-day conflict's toll was around 300 dead and 700 wounded, including civilians.

A ceasefire was announced by Hussein and Arafat, but the PFLP did not abide by it. It immediately held around 68 foreign nationals hostage in two Amman hotels, threatening to blow them up with the buildings if Sharif Shaker and Sharif Nasser were not dismissed and the Special Forces unit disbanded. Arafat did not agree with the PFLP, but had to play along as he feared public opinion. Hussein compromised and reduced tensions by appointing Mashour Haditha Al-Jazy, who was considered a moderate general, as army chief of staff, and Abdelmunim Rifai as prime minister, who in turn included six Palestinians as ministers in his government. Henry Kissinger, President Nixon's security advisor, gave the following assessment of the events in Jordan:

The authority and prestige of the Hashemite regime will continue to decline. The international credibility of Jordan will be further compromised... Greater fedayeen freedom of action will inevitably result in more serious breaches of the ceasefire in the Jordan Valley... Hussein faces an uncertain political future.

Newsreel about King Hussein's challenges in 1970

June 1970 became one of the most uncertain periods for the Hashemite monarchy in Jordan, as most foreign diplomats believed that events favored the fedayeen, and that the downfall of the monarchy was just a matter of time. Although Hussein was confident, members of his family started to wonder for how long the situation would last. 72-year-old Prince Zeid bin Hussein – the only son of Hussein bin Ali (Sharif of Mecca) that did not become a king – was visiting Amman in June and stayed with Hussein in the royal palace. He saw Hussein's management of the affair, and before he left, told his son that he thought Hussein to be the "most genuine, able and courageous Hashemite he had ever met", as well as "the greatest leader among all the Hashemite kings".

Another ceasefire agreement was signed between Hussein and Arafat on 10 July. It recognized and legitimized fedayeen presence in Jordan, and established a committee to monitor fedayeen conduct. The American-sponsored Rogers Plan for the Israeli–Palestinian conflict was publicized in July—based on Security Council Resolution 242. Nasser and Hussein accepted the plan, but Arafat rejected it on 26 July, claiming that it was a device to liquidate his movement. The PFLP and DFLP were more uncompromising, vehemently rejecting the plan and denouncing Nasser and Hussein. Meanwhile, a ceasefire was reached between Egypt and Israel on 7 August, formally ending the War of Attrition. On 15 August, Arafat was alleged to have said that "we have decided to convert Jordan into a cemetery for all conspirators—Amman shall be the Hanoi of the revolution." Paradoxically, Arafat had cautioned Habash and Hawatmeh, the respective leaders of the PFLP and the DFLP, from provoking the regime, as it enjoyed military superiority and could terminate their existence in Jordan at any time. But his calls went unheeded, and they started to call more openly for the overthrow of the Hashemites as a "prelude to the launching of a popular war for the liberation of Palestine". Another engagement between the army and the fedayeen occurred at the end of August, after the fedayeen ambushed army vehicles and staged an armed attack on the capital's post office.

=== Black September ===
==== Aircraft hijackings ====
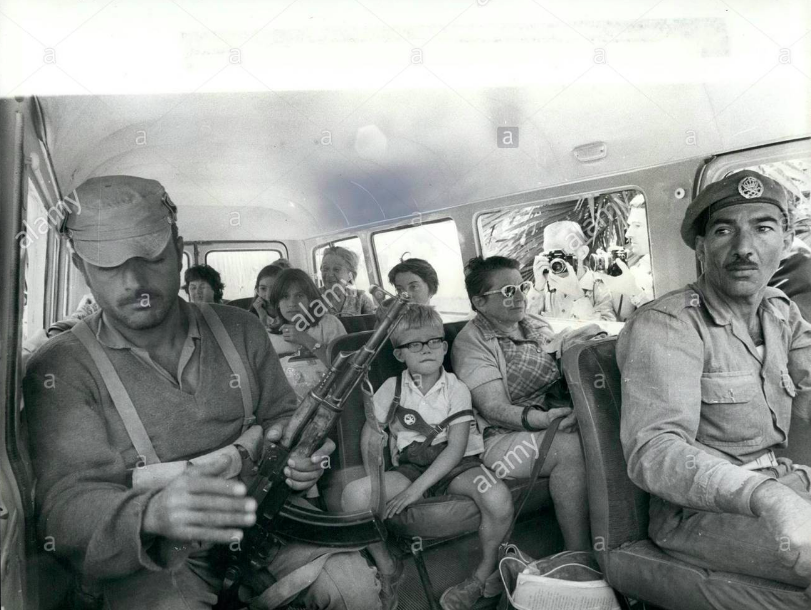
Jordanian army unit escorts rescued families back to Amman, 9 September 1970.

Hussein's motorcade came under fire on 1 September for the second time in three months, triggering clashes between the army and the fedayeen in Amman up until 6 September. On 6 September, three planes were hijacked by the PFLP: Swissair and TWA jets that landed at Azraq, Jordan, and a Pan Am jet that was flown to Cairo and immediately blown up after passengers were deplaned. The two jets that landed in Jordan had 310 passengers; the PFLP threatened to blow them up if fedayeen from European and Israeli prisons were not released. On 9 September, a third plane was hijacked to Jordan: a BOAC flight from Bahrain with 115 passengers was diverted to Zarqa. The PFLP announced that the hijackings were intended "to bring special attention to the Palestinian problem". After 371 hostages were removed, the planes were dramatically blown up in front of international press on 12 September. However, 54 hostages were kept by the organization for around two weeks. Arab regimes and Arafat were not pleased with the hijackings; the latter considered them to have caused more harm to the Palestinian issue. But Arafat could not dissociate himself from the hijackings, again because of Arab public opinion.

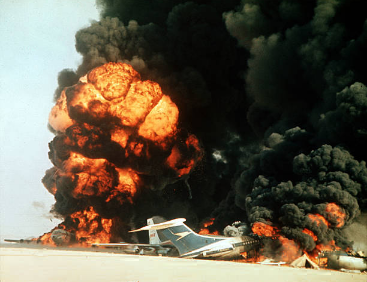
Dawson's Field aircraft being blown up in Zarqa by PFLP fedayeen in front of international press, 12 September 1970

Al-Jazy, the perceived pro-Palestinian newly appointed army chief of staff, resigned on 9 September in the midst of the hijacking crisis, and was replaced by Habis Majali, who was brought in from retirement. Natheer Rasheed, the intelligence director who had been appointed a month earlier, claimed that Al-Jazy was paid 200,000 Jordanian dinars, and that his resignation letter was written by the PLO. Shlaim claims that the prelude consisted of three stages: "conciliation, containment and confrontation". He argues that Hussein was patient so that he could demonstrate that he had done everything he could to avoid bloodshed, and that confrontation only came after all other options had been exhausted, and after public opinion (both international and local) had tipped against the fedayeen.

==== Jordanian army attacks ====
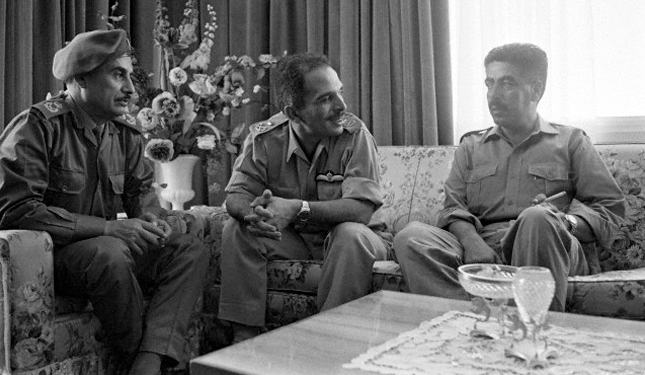
King Hussein on the first day of the operation meeting with his advisors, Prime Minister Wasfi Tal (right) and Army Chief of Staff Habis Majali (left), 17 September 1970

On the evening of 15 September, Hussein called in his advisors for an emergency meeting at his Al-Hummar residence on the western outskirts of Amman. Amer Khammash, Habis Majali, Sharif Shaker, Wasfi Tal, and Zaid Rifai were among those who were present; for some time they had been urging Hussein to sort out the fedayeen. The army generals estimated that it would take two or three days for the army to push the fedayeen out of major cities. Hussein dismissed the civilian government the following day and appointed Muhammad Daoud, a Palestinian loyalist to head a military government, thereby declaring martial law. Other Palestinians in the military government included figures like Adnan Abu Oudeh, an officer in the mukhabarat. Abu Oudeh later asked Hussein what the most difficult decision was that he had to make, to which the king replied: "The decision to recapture my capital."

On 17 September, the 60th Armoured Brigade entered the capital Amman from different directions and shelled the Wehdat and Hussein refugee camps where the fedayeen were based with tanks, artillery and mortars. The fedayeen put up a stiff resistance as they were well prepared, and the fighting lasted the next ten days without break. Simultaneously, the army surrounded and attacked other fedayeen-controlled cities including: Irbid, Jerash, As-Salt and Zarqa. The three days estimated by Hussein's generals could not be achieved, and the ensuing stalemate led Arab countries to step up pressure on Hussein to halt the fighting.

==== Foreign intervention ====
Jordan feared foreign intervention in the events in support of the fedayeen; this soon materialized on 18 September after a force from Syria with Palestine Liberation Army (PLA) markings marched towards Irbid, which the fedayeen had declared a "liberated" city. The 40th Armoured Brigade managed to block the Syrian forces' advance after heavy fighting. A second, much larger, Syrian incursion occurred on the same day: it consisted of two armored and one mechanized infantry brigades of the 5th Infantry Division, and around 300 tanks. Although the Syrian tanks had PLA markings, the troops were Syrian Army regulars. Syria issued no statement regarding the situation, but it is believed that the purpose of its intervention was to help the fedayeen overthrow the monarchy. Another tentative explanation is that the Syrians wanted to create a haven for the fedayeen in northern Jordan, from where they could negotiate with Hussein.

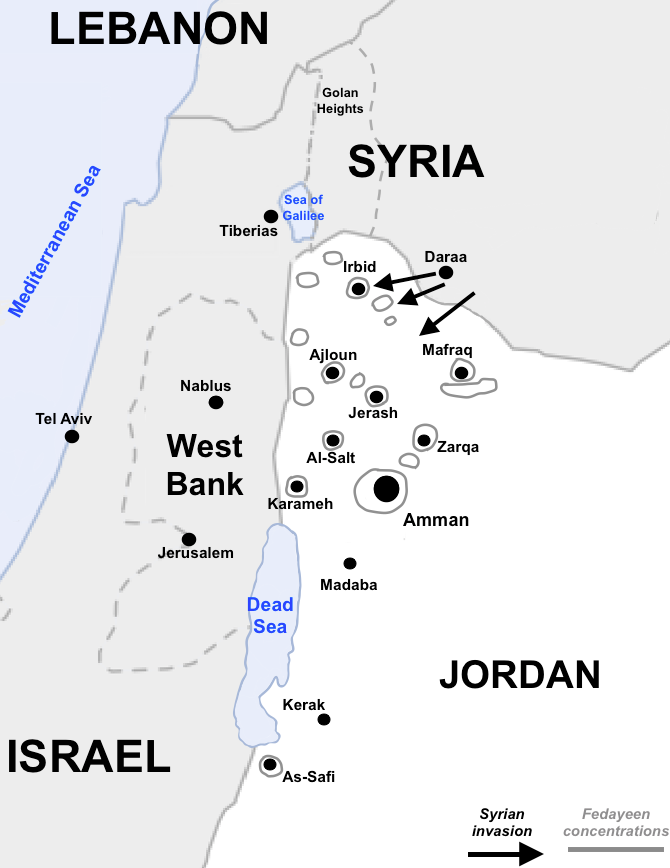
Map showing fedayeen concentrations in Jordan prior to September 1970, and the Syrian invasion

There were also concerns of Iraqi interference. A 17,000-man 3rd Armoured Division of the Iraqi Army had remained in eastern Jordan since after the 1967 Six-Day War. The Iraqi government sympathized with the Palestinians, but it was unclear whether the division would get involved in the conflict in favor of the fedayeen. Thus, the Jordanian 99th Brigade had to be detailed to monitor the Iraqis.

David Raab, one of the plane hijacking hostages, described the initial military actions of Black September:

We were in the middle of the shelling since Ashrafiyeh was among the Jordanian Army's primary targets. Electricity was cut off, and again we had little food or water. Friday afternoon, we heard the metal tracks of a tank clanking on the pavement. We were quickly herded into one room, and the guerrillas threw open the doors to make the building appear abandoned so it wouldn't attract fire. Suddenly, the shelling stopped.

Hussein arranged a cabinet meeting on the evening of the Syrian incursion, leaving them to decide if Jordan should seek foreign intervention. Two sides emerged from the meeting; one group of ministers favored military intervention from the United Kingdom or the United States, while the other group argued that it was an Arab affair that ought to be dealt with internally. The former group prevailed as Jordan was facing an existential threat. On 20 September, Hussein requested "Israel or other air intervention or threat thereof" through the British embassy. Britain refused to interfere militarily for fear of getting involved in a region-wide conflict; arguments such as "Jordan as it is is not a viable country" emerged. The British cabinet relayed Hussein's message to the Americans. Nixon and Kissinger were receptive to Hussein's request due to worries about regional escalation and Soviet influence. Nixon ordered the 82nd Airborne Division placed on full alert, and the U.S. Navy's 6th Fleet to be positioned off the coast of Israel, near Jordan. Kissinger favored Israeli intervention, while Nixon wanted America to intervene alone. However, Nixon changed his mind when, on 21 September, Hussein renewed his request. "Situation deteriorating dangerously following Syrian massive invasion", Hussein was quoted. "I request immediate physical intervention both land and air... to safeguard sovereignty, territorial integrity and independence of Jordan. Immediate air strikes on invading forces from any quarter plus air cover are imperative."

The Israeli cabinet was divided; some, including Golda Meir, wanted to overlook the Six-Day War and support Jordan, while right-wingers favored letting Jordan become a Palestinian state. Military commanders also prepared contingency plans to occupy Jordanian territory–including the Gilead Heights, Karak and Aqaba–in case the country disintegrated and there was a land-grab by its Iraqi, Syrian and Saudi Arabian neighbors . The pro-Hussein faction won, and, by 22 September, Israel readied its air force, "ostentatiously" deployed troops next to Syria and Jordan, and flew fighter jets over Syrian troops, using sonic booms as a deterrent. While Israel favored a combined ground/air assault (which Nixon authorized), Hussein requested that Israeli ground troops only enter Syria, leading the Israelis to repeatedly seek U.S. assurances in case of a Soviet response.

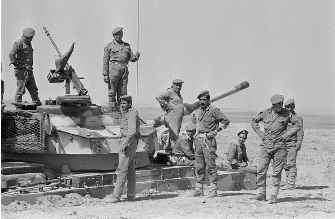
Jordanian soldiers surrounding a Centurion tank in Irbid to face off the Syrian invasion, 17 September 1970

On the same day, Hussein ordered the Royal Jordanian Air Force (RJAF) to attack the Syrian forces. A joint air-ground offensive proved successful, partly due to the Syrian Air Force's abstention from the fight. This has been attributed to power struggles within the Syrian Ba'athist government between Syrian Assistant Regional Secretary Salah Jadid, who had ordered the tank incursion, and Syrian Air Force commander Hafez al-Assad. Al-Assad claimed power after a coup shortly afterwards. Iraqi impartiality was attributed to Iraqi general Hardan al-Tikriti's commitment to Hussein not to interfere—he was assassinated a year later for this. It is thought that the rivalry between the Iraqi and Syrian Ba'ath Party was the real reason for Iraqi non-involvement.

The airstrikes inflicted heavy losses on the Syrians, and on the late afternoon of 22 September, the Syrian 5th Division began to retreat.

==== Egyptian-brokered agreement ====
After successes against the Syrian forces, the Jordanian Army steadily shelled the fedayeen's headquarters in Amman, and threatened to also attack them in other regions of the country. The Palestinians suffered heavy losses, and some of their commanders were captured. On the other hand, in the Jordanian army there were around 300 defections, including ranking officers such as Mahmoud Da'as. Hussein agreed to a cease-fire after Arab media started accusing him of massacring the Palestinians. Jordanian Prime Minister Muhammad Daoud defected to Libya after being pressured by Prime Minister Muammar Gaddafi, while the former was in Egypt representing Jordan at an emergency Arab League summit. Hussein himself decided to fly to Cairo on 26 September, where he was met with hostility from Arab leaders. Egyptian President Gamal Abdel Nasser led the first emergency Arab League summit in Cairo on 21 September. Arafat's speech drew sympathy from attending Arab leaders. Other heads of state took sides against Hussein, among them Muammar Gaddafi, who mocked him and his schizophrenic father King Talal. On 27 September, Hussein and Arafat signed an agreement brokered by Egyptian President Nasser. Nasser died the following day of a heart attack.

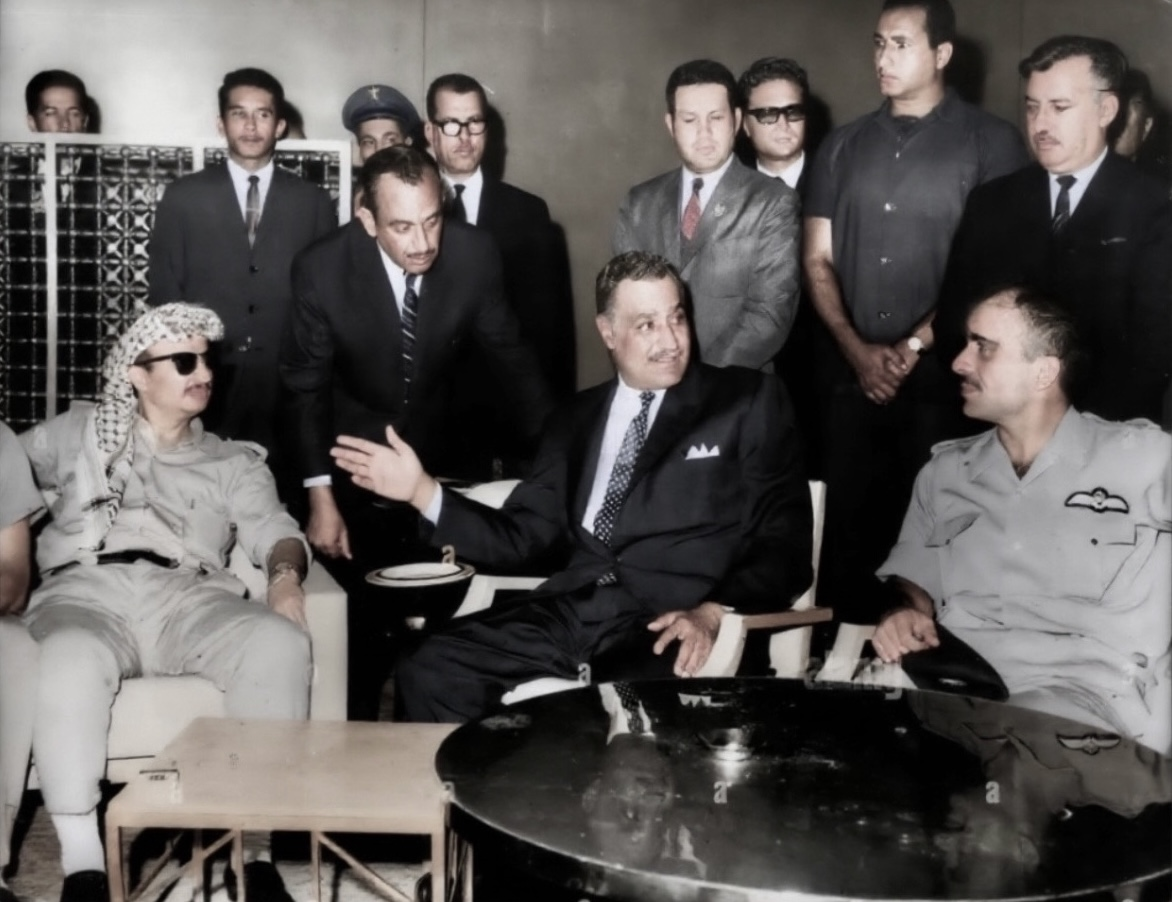
Egyptian President Gamal Abdel Nasser brokering a ceasefire between Yasser Arafat and King Hussein at the emergency Arab League summit in Cairo on 27 September 1970. Nasser died the following day of a heart attack.

The Jordanian army regained control of key cities and intersections in the country before accepting the ceasefire agreement brokered by Egypt's Nasser. Hussein appointed a Palestinian, Ahmad Toukan, as prime minister, instructing him to "bandage the wounds". In the period following the ceasefire, Hussein publicly revealed that the Jordanian army had uncovered around 360 underground PLO bases in Amman, and that Jordan held 20,000 detainees, among whom were "Chinese advisors".

==== Role of Zia-ul-Haq and Iranian leftist guerrillas ====
The head of a Pakistani training mission to Jordan, Brigadier Zia-ul-Haq (later Chief of Army Staff and President of Pakistan), was involved on the Jordanian side. Zia had been stationed in Amman for three years prior to Black September. During the events, according to CIA official Jack O'Connell, Zia was dispatched by Hussein north to assess Syria's military capabilities. The Pakistani commander reported back to Hussein, recommending the deployment of a RJAF squadron to the region. (Note: According to Pakistani journalist Raja Anwar, the mission may have been a violation of Zia's original assignment in Jordan by the Pakistani military, even though it helped Jordan repel the Syrian offensive. Hussein came to view Zia favorably, and later convinced Pakistani president Zulfikar Ali Bhutto to appoint him as Chief of Army Staff.) O'Connell also said that Zia personally led Jordanian troops during the battles.

Two Iranian leftist guerrilla organizations, the Organization of Iranian People's Fedai Guerrillas (OIPFG) and the People's Mojahedin Organization of Iran (PMOI), were involved in the conflict against Jordan. Their "collaboration with the PLO was particularly close, and members of both movements even fought side by side in Jordan during the events of Black September and trained together in Fatah camps in Lebanon". On 3 August 1972, PMOI operatives bombed the Jordanian embassy in Tehran during King Hussein's state visit as an act of "revenge" for the events of Black September.

==== Casualties ====
Arafat claimed that the Jordanian Armed Forces killed 25,000 Palestinians—other estimates put the number at between 2,000 and 3,400. The Syrian invasion attempt ended with 120 tanks lost, and around 600 Syrian casualties. The Jordanian Armed Forces suffered around 537 dead.

==== Post-September 1970 ====
Another agreement, called the Amman agreement, was signed between Hussein and Arafat on 13 October. It mandated that the fedayeen respect Jordanian sovereignty and desist from wearing uniforms or bearing arms in public. However it contained a clause requiring that Jordan recognize the PLO as the sole representative of the Palestinians; Wasfi Tal rejected this clause. Habash and Hawatmeh continued their attacks on the monarchy in spite of the Amman agreement. Hussein appointed Tal to form a government. Tal was seen as anti-Palestinian; however, he had made pro-Palestinian gestures during his previous two tenures as prime minister. Tal viewed Arafat with suspicion as he considered that the PLO concentrated its efforts against the Jordanian state rather than against Israel. On one occasion, Tal lost his temper and shouted at Arafat "You are a liar; you don't want to fight Israel!". Shlaim describes Tal as a more uncompromising figure than Hussein, and very popular with the army.

Clashes between the army, and the PFLP and DFLP, ensued after Tal was instated. Tal launched an offensive against fedayeen bases along the Amman-Jerash road in January 1971, and the army drove them out of Irbid in March. In April, Tal ordered the PLO to relocate all its bases from Amman to the forests between Ajloun and Jerash. The fedayeen initially resisted, but they were hopelessly outnumbered and outgunned. In July, the army surrounded the last remaining 2,000 fedayeen from the Ajloun-Jerash area. The fedayeen finally surrendered and were allowed to leave to Syria, but some 200 fighters preferred to cross the Jordan River to surrender to Israeli forces rather than to the Jordanians. At a 17 July press conference, Hussein declared that Jordanian sovereignty had been completely restored, and that there "was no problem now".

== Aftermath ==
=== Jordan ===
In the wake of the conflict, the new civilian government of Wasfi Tal began a wide-scale purge of the government's bureaucracy and military, freeing them from any supporters of the guerrillas. This effectively meant that large numbers of bureaucrats, Palestinian-Jordanian and otherwise, were expelled from their jobs. This was accompanied by a war by Tal on the newspapers and massive arrests of the government against the "saboteurs". Many newspapers were closed, their permits withdrawn and their editors rejected. Even though the conflict was not a result of a Jordanian-Palestinian divide, as there were Palestinians and Jordanians on both sides of the conflict, it paved the way for the divide subsequently. Ali Kassay further elaborated:

The composition of these two groups right up to September 1970 did not reflect a Jordanian-Palestinian divide. For instance, Nayef Hawatmeh, the head of the Democratic Front for the Liberation of Palestine (DFLP), one of the most radical Palestinian organizations, comes from Salt in the East Bank. On the other hand, General Mohammad Rasoul Al-Keilani, who headed Jordan's General Intelligence Directorate, came from a family that originates in Nablus in the West Bank. The point here is that the fighting of 1970 and the events that followed was the cause of a Jordanian-Palestinian divide, and not the result of one.

Hussein's resilience in the face of the joint Palestinian-Syrian challenge impressed both the West and Israel. Nixon ordered $10 million in aid to be delivered to Jordan, and another $30 million requested from Congress.

=== Fedayeen ===
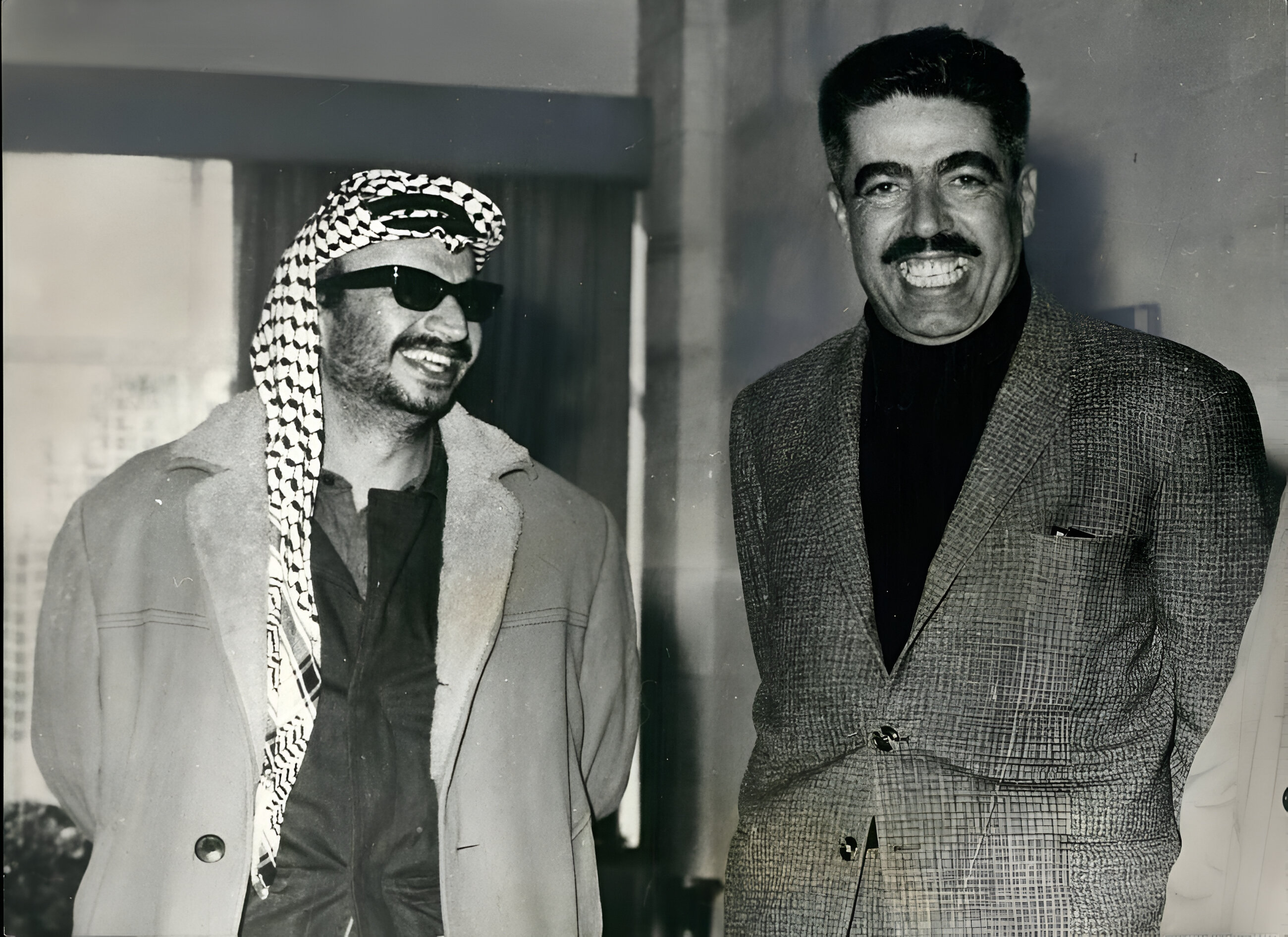
Wasfi Tal (right) with Yasser Arafat (left) on 12 December 1970 during ceasefire negotiations. Tal was assassinated on 28 November 1971 in Egypt by the Black September Organization.

The Black September Organization was established by Fatah members in 1971 for reprisal operations and international strikes after the September events. On 28 November 1971, four of the group's members assassinated Prime Minister Wasfi Tal in the lobby of the Sheraton Cairo Hotel in Egypt while he was attending an Arab League summit. The group would go on to perform other strikes against Jordan, and against Israeli and Western citizens and property outside of the Middle East, such as the Munich massacre against Israeli athletes in 1972. The Black September Organization was later disbanded in 1973–1974 as the PLO sought to exploit the Yom Kippur War of 1973 and pursue a diplomatic strategy. Fatah has always publicly denied its responsibility for Black September operations, but by the 2000s, some high-ranking Fatah and Black September officials acknowledged the relationship.

=== Lebanon ===
In the September fighting, the PLO lost its main base of operations. Fighters were driven to Southern Lebanon where they regrouped. The enlarged PLO presence in Lebanon and the intensification of fighting on the Israeli–Lebanese border stirred up internal unrest in Lebanon, where the PLO fighters added dramatically to the weight of the Lebanese National Movement, a coalition of Muslims, Arab nationalists and leftists who opposed the rightist, Maronite-dominated government. These developments helped precipitate the Lebanese Civil War, in which the PLO would ultimately be expelled to Tunisia.

== See also ==
- Battle of Karameh
- King Hussein's federation plan
- Palestinian political violence
- Lillehammer affair

== General and cited sources ==
- Bregman, Ahron (2002). Israel's Wars: A History Since 1947. London: Routledge. ISBN 978-0-415-28716-6.
- Kissinger, Henry (1999). Years of Renewal. Phoenix Press. ISBN 978-1-84212-042-2.
- Migdal, Joel S. (2014). Shifting Sands: The United States in the Middle East. Columbia University Press. ISBN 978-0-231-16672-0.
- Raab, David (2007). Terror in Black September: The First Eyewitness Account of the Infamous 1970 Hijackings. New York: Palgrave Macmillan. ISBN 978-1-4039-8420-3.
- Shlaim, Avi (2008). Lion of Jordan: The Life of King Hussein in War and Peace. Vintage Books. ISBN 978-1-4000-7828-8.
- Salibi, Kamal (15 December 1998). The Modern History of Jordan. I.B. Tauris. ISBN 978-1-86064-331-6.
