= Alan Hart (writer) =

British author and reporter

Alan Hart (17 February 1942 – 15 January 2018) was an author, former Middle East Chief Correspondent for Independent Television News, and former BBC Panorama presenter specialising in the Middle East. He wrote the three-part series Zionism: The Real Enemy of the Jews.

== Career ==
Hart began his career as a reporter in Central Africa, on the Nyasaland Times, and served as a war correspondent in Vietnam.

In 1973, Hart addressed global poverty with a two-hour film titled Five Minutes to Midnight. Its world premiere was hosted by Secretary General Kurt Waldheim at the opening of the 7th Special Session of the UN General Assembly that had been called to discuss a new world economic order.

Hart was involved in the failed attempt by the last Shah of Iran, Mohammad Reza Pahlavi, to gain exile in the UK after he was deposed in the Iranian Revolution. On 9 February 1979, as a freelance journalist close to the Shah, Hart contacted Downing Street to say the deposed royal was interested in living full-time at his lavish estate in Surrey, southwest of London.

Hart told of having been the unofficial linkman in a secret exploratory dialogue between Arafat and Shimon Peres in 1980.

Hart was never a member of any political party or group. When asked what drove him he said, "I have three children, and, when the world falls apart, I want to be able to look them in the eye and say, "Don't blame me. I tried."

== Views ==
=== Zionism and the State of Israel ===
Hart was a critic of Zionism, writing in 2007 that:

The colonial enterprise that Zionism is has corrupted everything it touched, beginning with the United Nations and including the mainstream media, what passes for democracy in the Western world (America especially) and Judaism itself.

In an article published on the Iranian Press TV, Hart described Zionists as "The New Nazis" and argue that "Europeans and Americans could have stopped the original Nazis and prevented the extermination of six million Jews. If Europeans and Americans do not stop the New Nazis, it is likely that their end game will be the extermination of millions of Palestinians."

In a letter to British Conservative Party leader David Cameron in August 2007, Hart wrote that "the Zionist state, which came into being as a consequence of Zionism terrorism and ethnic cleansing, had no right to exist and, more to the point, could have no right to exist unless ... it was recognised and legitimized by those who were dispossessed of their land and their rights during the creation of the Zionist state. In international law only the Palestinians could give Israel the legitimacy it craved. And that legitimacy was the only thing the Zionists could not and cannot take from the Palestinians by force." He also stated that the "Jews who went to Palestine in answer to Zionism's call had no biological connection to the ancient Hebrews. The incoming Zionist Jews were mainly foreign nationals of many lands... The notion that there are two entire peoples with an equally valid claim to the same land is an historical nonsense." Hart has also suggested that the United States is in danger of an Israeli nuclear strike with a stolen nuclear weapon to trigger a war with Iran and "finish the ethnic cleansing of Palestine" under cover of war, which Hart claims that Israel is planning to do "as soon as the opportunity presents itself."

In February 2011, Hart called for the impeachment of American President Barack Obama. Hart argued that Obama's decision to veto the Security Council resolution condemning Israeli settlement activities in West Bank and demanding that Israel "immediately and completely cease" all such activities. Hart argued "a president who allows a lobby group to put the interests of a foreign power above those of the country of which they are citizens, and who by doing so puts his fellow citizens more in harm's way than they otherwise would be, is guilty of treason." Hart also wrote that "the only thing to which the Obama administration has been deeply committed is not provoking the wrath of the Zionist lobby and its stooges in Congress and the mainstream media."

On 25 April 2013, Hart posted what he called his final entry on Israel, Zionism, the Palestinians and related subjects. After complaining at length about corrupted historical truths and lamenting that the Palestinians, wealthy Arab elites and Western supporters of both had not been willing or able to use their resources to defeat Zionism, Hart claimed that Israel would in the end triumph as the propaganda battle had been lost, and that the endgame to the Israeli-Palestinian conflict would probably be "final Zionist ethnic cleansing of Palestine, followed, quite possibly, by another great turning against the Jews, provoked by Zionism’s insufferable self-righteousness and contempt for international law". Hart stated that personal and professional difficulties left him unable to continue his writing and advocacy efforts.

== Books ==
Hart was the author of several books including a biography of Yasser Arafat, Terrorism or Freedom Fighters: Yasser Arafat and the PLO (1984). Later, he completed the trilogy Zionism: The Real Enemy of the Jews. In an article discussing his book, Hart stated that "until enough Americans are made aware of the truth of history, no American president will have the space to break the Zionist lobby's stranglehold on Congress."
