= Elections and Distributive Politics in Mubarak's Egypt =

2010 nonfiction book

Elections and Distributive Politics in Mubarak’s Egypt
- Author: Lisa Blaydes
- Publisher: Cambridge University Press
- Publication date: 2010
- ISBN: 978-0-511-97646-9 Ebook

Elections and Distributive Politics in Mubarak's Egypt is a nonfiction book by Lisa Blaydes. It was published in print in 2010 and electronically in 2011 by Cambridge University Press. The book analyzes elections during the Hosni Mubarak regime, arguing that these elections helped strengthen the political system by creating a façade to hide corruption, manage competition among the elite, and collect information about elite's loyalty and competence. The book was based on Blaydes' dissertation, Competition without Democracy: Elections and Distributive Politics in Mubarak's Egypt.

== Summary ==
Blaydes argues that the ruling National Democratic Party of Egypt utilizes elections to decide how to distribute resources among the 'rent-seeking elite'. This term refers to businessmen, tribal leaders, heads of influential families and senior bureaucratic appointees. Since Egypt has parliamentary immunity, seats are investments which the elite 'bid' to receive the prize, namely protection from criminal prosecution. In effect, this system legalizes corruption while creating a political class with a large financial motive to support the regime. For voters, elections come with their own rewards. Public sector employees often receive bonuses to vote for a particular candidate, a form of voter buying, which offer small rewards to poor voters.

== Reviews ==
Steven Heydemann (2012) describes the book as "a compelling account" which provides a relevant understanding of Egyptian politics even after the 2011 revolution. Jellissen (2012) wrote a glowing review, concluding that book offers up an excellent contribution to the broader literature on authoritarianism as well as to Middle Eastern areas studies. Sulley (2012) is a mostly positive review, though it argues that the work over relies on the Egyptian press, since Egypt does not have a free press, so even independent outlets are controlled by the regime. The review also challenges the notion of competitiveness in Egyptian elections and argues that the book does not delve deeper into the role of the USA and the IMF in backing the regime, despite claims of 'promoting democracy'.

Brownlee (2011) notes that this work contradicts previous findings on Egyptian clientelism, which find that elections were not competitive. Blaydes, by contrast, argued that during the 2005 elections, "Electoral manipulation takes place in a limited number of cases (usually aimed at the opposition Muslim Brotherhood), and, as such, the majority of the 444 electoral contests are genuinely competitive". Specifically, Blaydes argues that elections were competitive in races between official candidates of the NDP and independents associated with the NDP, since they provided an outlet for elite competition and export political mobilization onto the elite. Blaydes uses the fact that the rates of reelections in the 1987, 1990, 1995, 2000 and 2005 parliamentary elections ranged from 42 to 19%. Brownlee argues that reelection rates do not account for cases where a parliamentarian retired or chose to back a successor. Furthermore, protests by blue and white collar workers in 2006 dwarf what the regime was able to mobilize in voters in 2005. Brownlee concludes the review by writing that while it "poses intriguing hypotheses", the evidence is too limited.

== General references ==
- Brownlee, Jason (2011). "Elections and Distributive Politics in Mubarak's Egypt. By Lisa Blaydes. New York: Cambridge University Press, 2010. 288p. $81.45". Perspectives on Politics. 9 (4): 958–960. doi:10.1017/s1537592711003665. JSTOR 41623750.
- Greven, Rebecca Young (September 2012). "Book Review: Other Areas: Elections and Distributive Politics in Mubarak's Egypt". Political Studies Review. 10 (3): 466–466. doi:10.1111/j.1478-9302.2012.00285_1.x. ISSN 1478-9299.
- Heydemann, Steven (February 2012). "Lisa Blaydes, Elections and Distributive Politics in Mubarak's Egypt (New York: Cambridge University Press, 2011). Pp. 288. $90.00 cloth". International Journal of Middle East Studies. 44 (1): 196–198. doi:10.1017/S0020743811001504. ISSN 0020-7438. JSTOR 41623750.
- Jellissen, Susan M. (April 2012). "Book Review: Elections and Distributive Politics in Mubarak's Egypt". Comparative Political Studies. 45 (4): 535–539. doi:10.1177/0010414011423520. ISSN 0010-4140.
- Sulley, Consolata Raphael (September 2012). "Lisa Blaydes, Elections and Distributive Politics in Mubarak's Egypt". CEU Political Science Journal. 7 (3). Central European University: 367.

== Similar Works ==
- Abdel Naeem Mahmoud, Renia. (2018). Beyond Electoral Politics: Crony Capitalism, Collective Action and the Distribution of Public Spending in Egypt [PhD thesis]. University of Oxford.
- Kassem-Ewea, Maye Salah el-Din (1998). The Role of Non-Competitive Multi-Party Legislative Elections in Mubarak's Egypt (PDF) (Thesis). University of London.
- Kienle, Eberhard (2001). A Grand Delusion: Democracy and Economic Reform in Egypt. Bloomsbury Publishing. ISBN 9780857713032.
- Smierciak, Sarah (2021). Cronyism and Elite Capture in Egypt: From Businessmen Cabinet to Military Inc. Routledge. ISBN 9781000485318.
