= Egypt Arab Socialist Party =

Egypt Arab Socialist Party حزب مصر العربي الاشتراكي
- Chairperson: Wahid Al-Uksory (last)
- Founder: Anwar Sadat; Mamdouh Salem
- Founded: 1976
- Dissolved: 2012
- Merged into: Congress Party
- Headquarters: Cairo
- Ideology: Egyptian nationalism Statism; Infitah
- Political position: Centre (Note: Since 1976, there have been 3 political factions in Egypt: the Liberal Socialists Party (SPO) is right-wing, the Egypt Arab Socialist Party (ASU) is centre, and the National Progressive Unionist Rally Party (NUPO) is left-wing.)
- National affiliation: Arab Socialist Union (1976–1978)
- Colours: Black
- House of Representatives: 0 / 568

The Egypt Arab Socialist Party (Arabic: حزب مصر العربي الاشتراكي Hizb Misr Al-'Arabi Al-Ishtiraki) was a political party in Egypt. It was established as the centrist faction of the governing Arab Socialist Union (ASU) and became an independent party after ASU's dissolution.

== History and profile ==
The party was established in 1976 by Egyptian President Anwar Sadat and its head was Mamdouh Salem. He served as the prime minister of Egypt from 1975 to 1978.

The party generally pressed for preserving the gains of the Egyptian Revolution of 1952.

It started as a political organisation that was part of the single-ruling party at the time, the Arab Socialist Union (ASU). And It participated in Republican Egypt's first ever multi-faction election in 1976. It won a large majority of seats in that election becoming the largest political faction in Egypt. In 1977 It became a political party after the ASU was dissolved, and it kept being the largest party in Egypt until 1978.

In 1978, President Sadat announced the creation of his new political party, the National Democratic Party (NDP). Not long after that announcement, all prominent party members and all members of Parliament of the EASP joined the President's new party along with MPs from other parties. Only a very small faction of the party stayed and it continued to function as a minor party, barely having any presence in Egypt's political scene.

Later, the party nominated its head, Wahid Al-Uksory, to run for Egypt's first multi-candidate presidential election in 2005. It was part of the Democratic Alliance for Egypt during the 2011–12 parliamentary election.

In 2012, The EASP along with other parties, merged to become the Congress Party.

== Electoral history ==
=== Presidential elections ===
Election	Party candidate	Votes	%	Result
2005	Wahid Al-Uksory	11,881	0.17%	Lost ✗

=== People's Assembly of Egypt elections ===
Election	Seats	+/–	Position	Result
1976	295 / 360	▲295	▲1st	Supermajority government (As part of ASU)
1979	0 / 392	▼295	N/A	N/A
1984	0 / 458	Steady	N/A	N/A
1987	0 / 458	Steady	N/A	N/A
1990	0 / 454	Steady	N/A	N/A
1995	0 / 454	Steady	N/A	N/A
2000	0 / 454	Steady	N/A	N/A
2005	0 / 454	Steady	N/A	N/A
2010	0 / 518	Steady	N/A	N/A
2011-12	1 / 508	▲1	▲1st	As part of the Democratic Alliance for Egypt

== See also ==
- Islamic socialism
- List of Islamic political parties
