= Hazem Salah Abu Ismail =

Egyptian politician (born 1961)

- حازم صلاح أبو إسماعيل
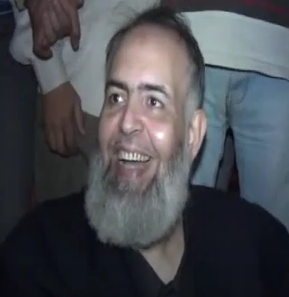

Leader of the Flag Party
- Incumbent
- Assumed office 13 February 2013
- Preceded by: Position established

Personal details
- Born: 16 June 1961 (age 65) Bohormos, Giza, Egypt
- Party: Flag Party
- Spouse: Dalia al-Morsi
- Children: 3
- Parent: Salah Abu Ismail (father)
- Education: Cairo University
- Occupation: Lawyer, politician

Hazem Salah Abu Ismail (Note: Arabic: حازم صلاح أبو إسماعيل; IPA: [ħæːzem sˤɑˈlɑːħ ˈæbu ʔesmæˈʕiːl]) (born 16 June 1961) is an Egyptian lawyer, Islamic preacher and politician who ran in the 2012 Egyptian presidential election and founded the Flag Party.

Abu Ismail was born in Giza in 1961 and graduated with a law degree from Cairo University in 1983. During his career as a lawyer, he took up several high-profile cases against Hosni Mubarak's regime, which included defending prominent members of the Muslim Brotherhood.

Abu Ismail ran in the parliamentary elections of 1995 and 2005, but lost both elections amidst accusations of electoral fraud. He then retreated from electoral politics, but remained politically active through his sermons that were highly critical of the regime. He supported the 25 January revolution and announced his candidacy for the 2012 presidential election on an Islamist platform. Although considered a frontrunner, he was disqualified from running over allegations that his mother held American citizenship. Following the election, he supported Mohamed Morsi's presidency while opposing some of his policies.

Abu Ismail opposed the 2013 coup d'état that overthrew Morsi and was arrested in its aftermath. He was subsequently tried and convicted of forging official documents regarding his mother's nationality, insulting the police and inciting violence around a court, and is currently serving several prison sentences. His trials have been denounced by supporters and human rights organisations as being politically motivated.

Abu Ismail's political positions stem from his Islamist beliefs. He has advocated for the gradual implementation of Islamic law, and has criticised the United States and the Egypt–Israel peace treaty while not pushing for war with Israel.

== Early life ==
Abu Ismail was born in Bohormos, Giza in 1961, the son of Salah Abu Ismail, a well-known Al-Azhar scholar and a member of the Muslim Brotherhood and the Egyptian parliament.

He graduated from the faculty of law at Cairo University in 1983, third in his class. He was deeply involved in student politics during his years in secondary school and the university.

== Legal career ==
Following his graduation, Abu Ismail worked as a lawyer, a profession he said kept him independent and away from "flattery and submissiveness." He joined the Egyptian lawyers guild, and was elected to its council in 2005.

Abu Ismail defended many prominent members of the Muslim Brotherhood, including Kharirat El-Shater, against military tribunals under the Hosni Mubarak regime. He also defended Suleiman Khater, who killed seven Israelis in the Sinai Peninsula, and took up a number of high-profile cases against the regime, including a case to stop exporting Nile water to Israel.

== Political career ==
=== Before the revolution ===
Abu Ismail stood as a candidate for the Muslim Brotherhood in the 1995 parliamentary election, but was eliminated in the second round. He ran again in the 2005 election against National Democratic Party candidate and former minister Amal Osman. He ultimately lost, but the election was widely criticised for being rigged in Osman's favour. Following the 2005 election, he retreated from electoral politics, boycotting the 2010 election.

Prior to the revolution, Abu Ismail gave weekly sermons at the Assad Bin El-Forat Mosque in Cairo. The sermons were highly politicised, strongly criticising the regime's human rights abuses and defending Muslim Brotherhood members facing military trials.

=== 25 January revolution ===
Abu Ismail was an early supporter of the January 25 Revolution that toppled the Mubarak regime and was a heavy critic of the Egyptian military, a position at odds with many Salafists, with whom he is usually associated. After Mubarak's ouster, he took part in a protest to bring forward the date of the presidential election, originally scheduled for 2013. Eventually, the election was held in 2012.

=== Presidential candidacy ===
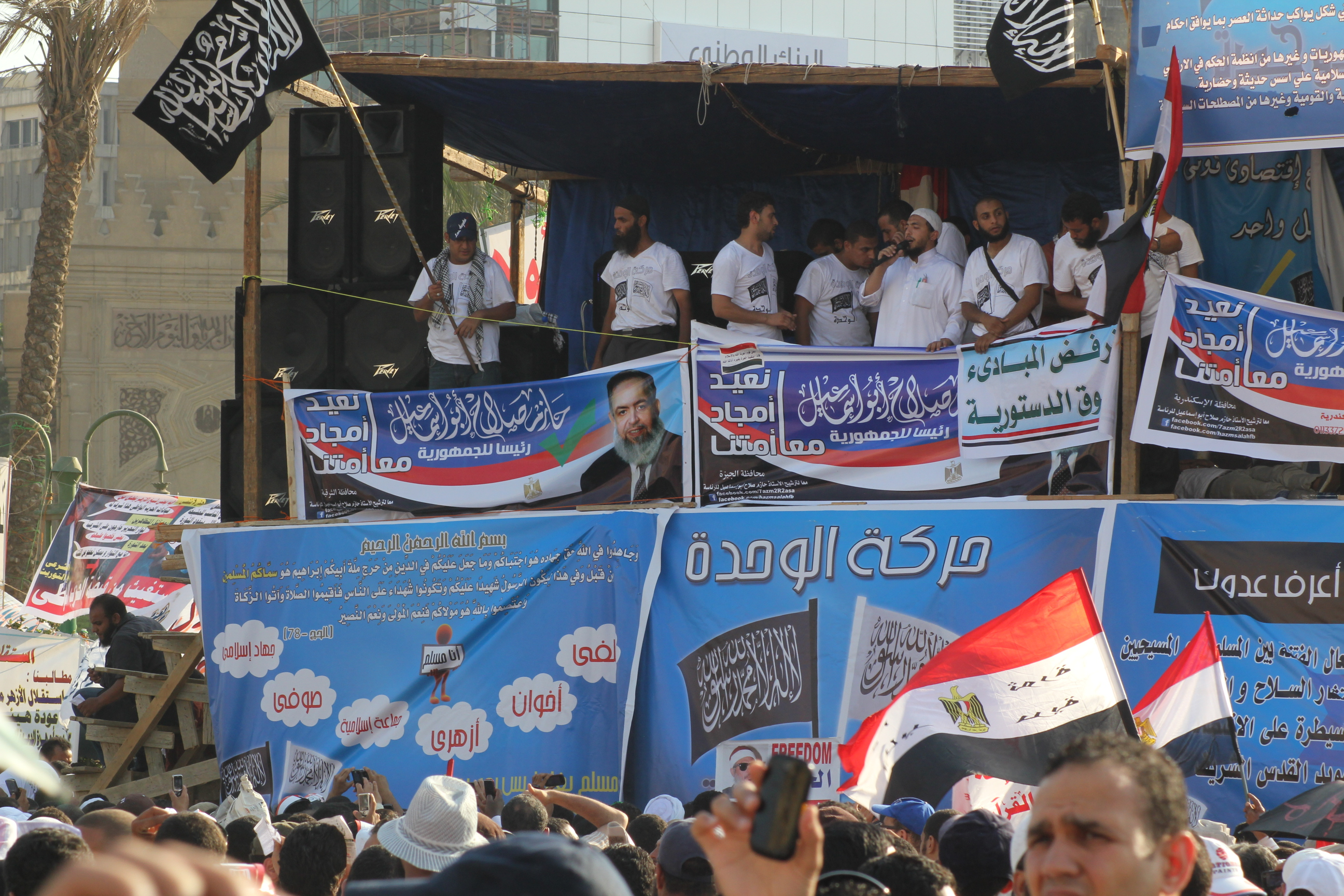
A protest in support of Abu Ismail's presidential candidacy

In May 2011, Abu Ismail announced his intention to run for the Egyptian presidency. In March 2012, he officially registered his candidacy after securing 150,000 signatures and the support of 58 members of parliament according to his campaign, far more than the required 30,000 signatures or 30 representatives.

Abu Ismail ran under the slogan "we will live in dignity," and appealed to voters of the Muslim Brotherhood and the Salafist al-Nour Party. By April, he had become one of the frontrunners, and enjoyed notable displays of popular support.

On 4 April, The New York Times reported that according to Californian government documents, Abu Ismail's deceased mother was a US citizen, which would make him ineligible for the presidency under the Egyptian constitution. Abu Ismail said that his mother only held a green card, and accused the authorities of spreading this claim to tarnish his image, saying that they only relied on travel documents but have not presented a passport.

On 5 April, the Ministry of Interior said that it had confirmed his mother's U.S. citizenship. Abu Ismail filed a case against the ministry at the State Council, which ruled that it found no proof of his mother's alleged dual citizenship. The electoral commission, whose decisions are final, nonetheless disqualified him on 14 April.

During and after the controversy, Abu Ismail's supporters protested against his disqualification, describing it as a plot by the military and the United States over fears that he didn't support Egyptian ties to Israel and would implement Islamic law. On 29 April, a supporter of Abu Ismail was killed and others injured in clashes between protesters and unidentified assailants, who the protesters claimed were government agents.

=== Flag Party ===
Abu Ismail founded the Raya Party (Flag Party) on 27 February 2013. He was reportedly in talks to form an alliance with the recently formed Homeland Party, but he instead formed the Nation Alliance in early March 2013.

Abu Ismail defended the legitimacy of Mohamed Morsi's presidency, and opposed calls for him to step down before his term ended. However, he was an opponent of some of Morsi's and the Muslim Brotherhood's policies and criticised then-defence minister Abdel Fattah el-Sisi, describing him as an "emotional actor" who sought popular approval.

== Arrest and trials ==
Abu Ismail denounced the military's overthrow of Mohammed Morsi as a coup d'état. He was arrested at his home on 5 July 2013, two days after the coup. On 14 July, Prosecutor General Hisham Barakat ordered Abu Ismail's assets to be frozen. He appeared in court on 18 November over accusations regarding his mother's citizenship. He threatened to cede the defense if there was no real justice at the court.

Abu Ismail was given two 1 year sentences on 20 January and 12 April 2014 for contempt of court. He was sentenced to 7 years imprisonment on 16 April on charges of forging official documents during his presidential candidacy, and to 1 year on 9 September for "insulting the police" over a video of him in December 2012 calling for an overhaul in the police system, in which he allegedly referred to the police as dogs. On 29 January 2017, he was sentenced to 5 years imprisonment on charges of inciting the besieging of Nasr City court in December 2012. The ruling was upheld by an appeals court in May 2019. Egypt Watch, an independent advocacy and research platform, has described Abu Ismail's trials and convictions as politically motivated.

=== Detention conditions ===
In September 2023, The New Arab reported that Abu Ismail had been denied visits from his family for six years, and that he was placed in solitary confinement, not allowed to communicate with other prisoners. In the same month, an Egyptian activist released what he claimed were leaked videos from Abu Ismail's cell in the Badr prison complex. The clips showed Abu Ismail using his blanket to close the cell's toilet, which was directly in front of the camera. The Egyptian Ministry of Interior said the videos were fabricated.

== Political positions ==
Abu Ismail has been described as a Salafist, ultraconservative, and a populist.

=== Religious policy ===
Abu Ismail has stated that he would not do anything religiously forbidden or "turn against Allah." He said that while he does not support the quick application of strict Islamic codes, Muslim rulers should work towards applying elements of the Sharia that are "widely-accepted," such as prohibiting alcohol. In an interview, he said that he shared the same goal of establishing an Islamic state as al-Qaeda, but that their approach was mistaken. He has also suggested allocating different beaches for Muslims and foreign tourists.

Abu Ismail said that the jizya "demonstrates the honor of Islam," as it exempted non-Muslims from fighting wars against their religion in return for a small fee. However, he said that he would not implement the jizya, and that he had no objection to the idea of a Christian vice president.

=== Economic policy ===
Abu Ismail said that the Egyptian economy had been previously forced into overdependence on tourism to make the country subservient to foreign interests. He pledged to achieve an eightfold increase in the income from tourism nonetheless. He said that he supported archaeological and medical tourism, and pointed to Malaysia as a Muslim country with a large tourism industry.

=== Foreign policy ===
Abu Ismail has spoken against the United States and Israel and accused them of working to subvert the presidential election for their own benefit. He has described himself as an enemy of the Egypt–Israel peace treaty, while maintaining that he didn't intend to wage war or engage in an economic confrontation against Israel.

Abu Ismail has spoken of Iran as a successful model of independence from the United States, while simultaneously pointing to his doctrinal differences with the Shia.

== Personal life ==
Abu Ismail is married to Dalia al-Morsi and is a father of three sons. In May 2020, his son al-Baraa was arrested.
