= Essam Shiha =

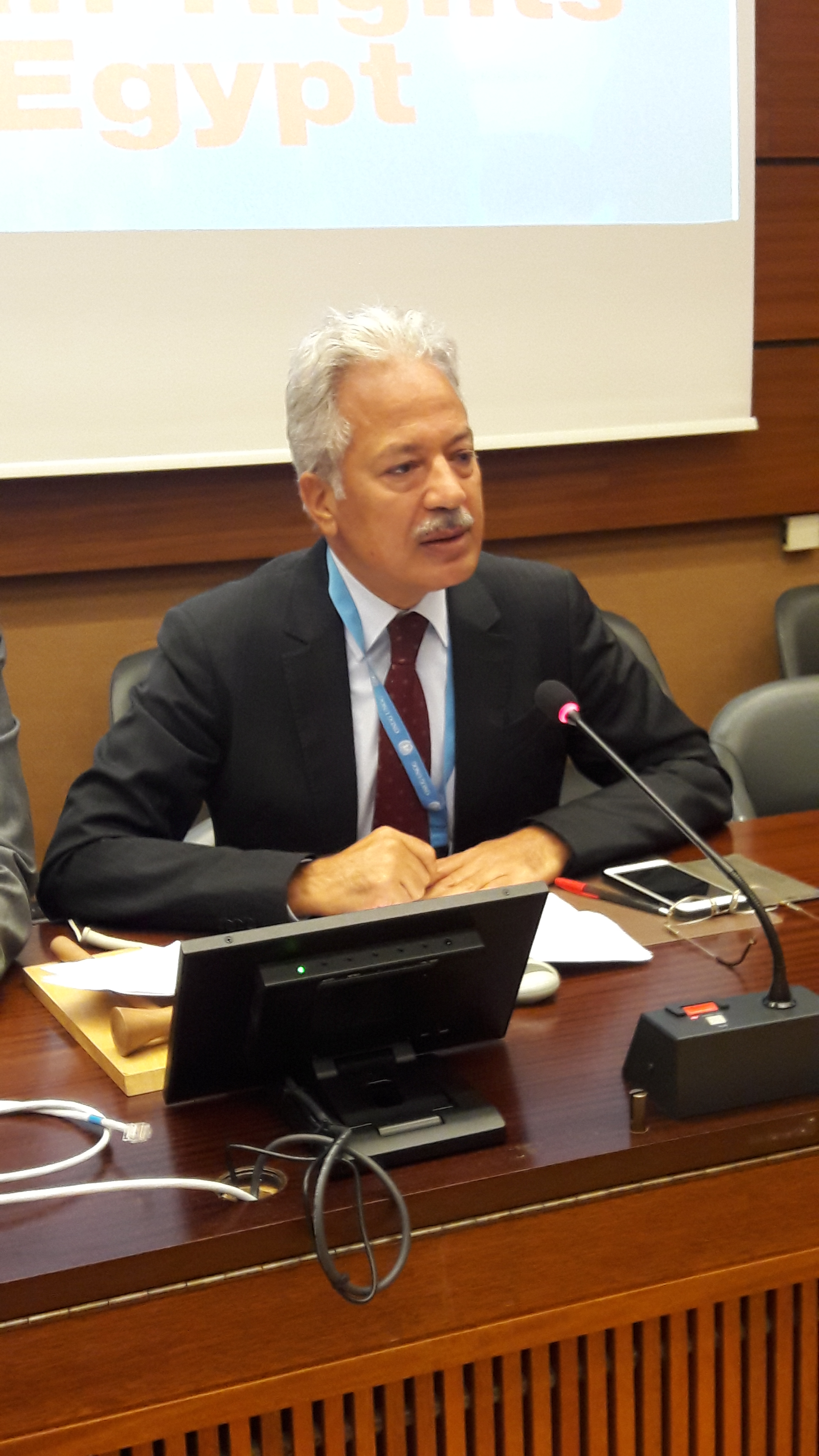
- Essam Shiha at the United Nations Human Rights Council

Personal details
- Political party: New Wafd Party

Essam Shiha is an Egyptian lawyer, politician and human rights activist. Shiha is a member of the National Council for Human Rights, president of the Egyptian Organization for Human Rights and former member of supreme committee of The Wafd Party

Shiha was one of the protegees of one of the party's historical leader Fouad Serageddin and for decades has been an influential leading member of the party. Shiha led a reformist faction of the Wafd that opposed El-Sayyid el-Badawi's leadership of the party which led to his suspension for a few years. However Shiha was reinstated to his old post in the party after Bahaa El-Din Abu Shoka replaced el Badawi as party leader.

Shiha is also an ardent defender of human rights and basic freedoms, and occupied the post of Secretary General of the Egyptian Organization for Human Rights, one of Egypt's oldest and largest human rights associations; and after the death of EOHR's president Hafez Abu Seada Shiha was unanimously elected by the board of trustees to replace him as president.

In October 2021 the Egyptian House of Representatives announced the new composition of Egypt's National human rights institution the National Council for Human Rights and Essam Shiha was among the principal new appointees. As a member of NCHR Shiha pledged to resume his efforts to promote and defend human rights and basic freedoms in Egypt.
