= Egyptian Wafd Party =

Political party in Egypt

Egyptian Wafd Party حزب الوفد المصري Egyptian Delegation Party
- Leader: Abdel-Sanad Yamama
- Chairperson: El-Sayyid el-Badawi
- Secretary-General: Monir Fakhry Abdel Nour
- Vice Chairman: Khaled Kandil
- Founder: Fouad Serageddin
- Founded: 4 February 1978; 48 years ago
- Preceded by: Wafd Party
- Headquarters: El-Dokki, Giza, Egypt
- Newspaper: Al-Wafd
- Ideology: National liberalism; Liberal conservatism; Economic liberalism; Conservative liberalism
- Political position: Centre-right
- National affiliation: National Unified List for Egypt (since 2020)
- Colors: Green
- Slogan: "Justice is above power, and the nation is above the government" الحق فوق القوة والأمة فوق الحكومة
- Anthem: "Arise O' Egyptian!" قوم يا مصري
- Senate: 2 / 300
- House of Representatives: 12 / 596

Party flag

Website
- alwafd.news (Al-Wafd, in Arabic)

The New Wafd Party (Arabic: حزب الوفد الجديد, lit. 'New Delegation Party'), officially the Egyptian Wafd Party (Arabic: حزب الوفد المصري), and also known as the Al-Wafd Party, is a nationalist liberal party in Egypt.

It is the extension of one of the oldest and historically most active political parties in Egypt, the Wafd Party, which was dismantled after the 1952 Revolution. The New Wafd was established in 1978, but banned only months later. It was revived after President Anwar Sadat's assassination in 1981.

In Egypt's legislative and presidential elections in November and December 2005, the party won 6 out of 454 seats in the People's Assembly, and its presidential candidate Numan Gumaa received 2.9 per cent of the total votes cast for president.

Following the 2011 revolution the party joined the National Democratic Alliance for Egypt electoral bloc, which was dominated by the Muslim Brotherhood's Freedom and Justice Party.

As the date neared for fielding candidate lists, Wafd left the alliance and competed in the elections independently. In the subsequent parliamentary elections, the party came third with 9.2% of the vote, and was the most successful non-Islamist party.

Wafd Party is now headquartered in Dokki, Giza Province in Egypt.

El-Sayyid el-Badawi is the current party chairman after winning the Wafd's internal elections in 2026, replacing Abdel-Sanad Yamama.

== Ideology and goals ==
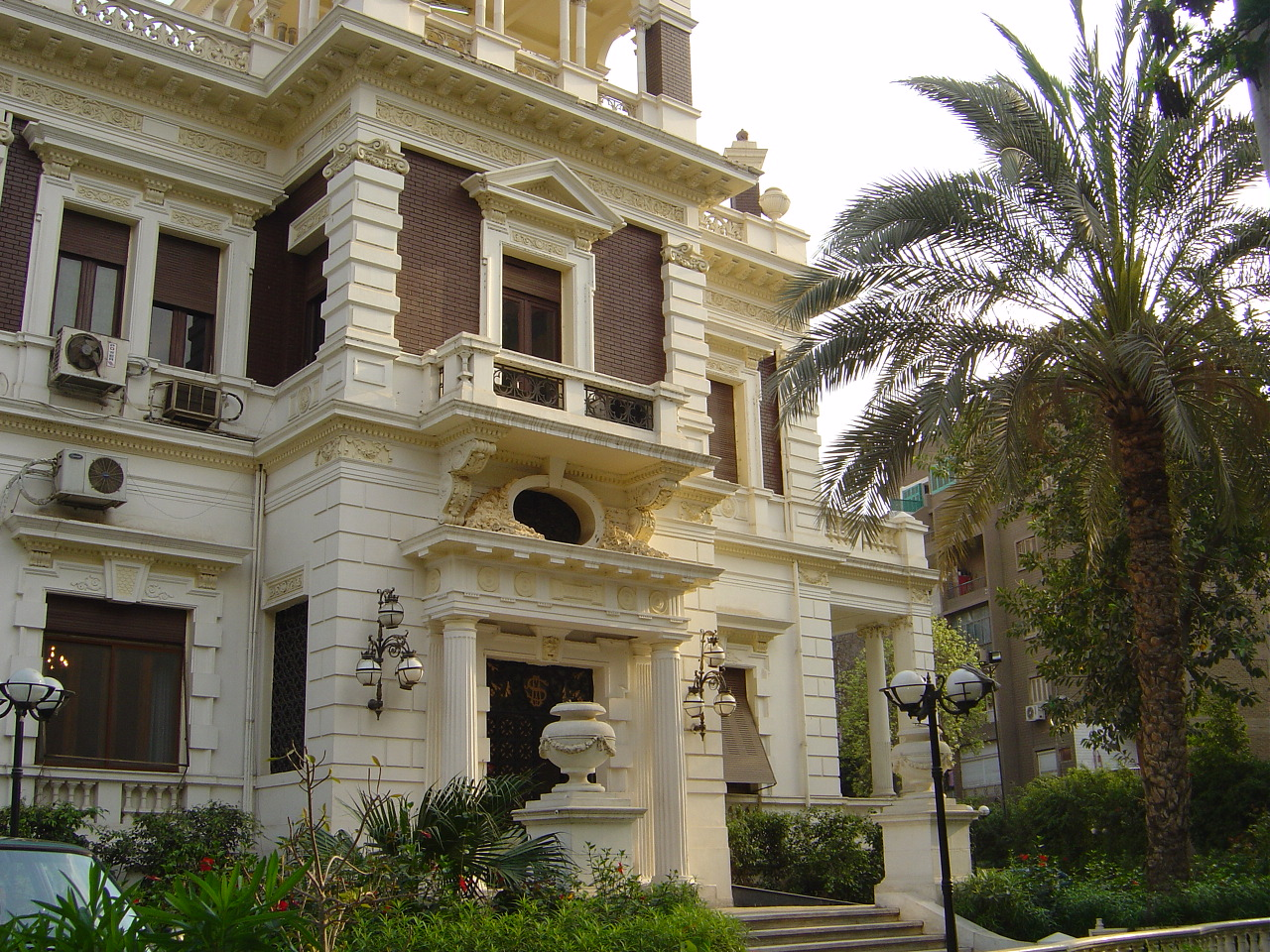
The party's headquarters in El-Dokki, Giza.

The New Wafd has tried to place itself at the ideological center between the main historic traditions in Egypt of Arab socialism and private capitalism. It has been critical of the government's encouragement of foreign private investment, advocating a more balanced approach to the relationship between private and public sectors.

The party presses for introducing political, economic, and social reforms, promoting democracy, ensuring basic freedoms and human rights, and maintaining national unity.

The party also calls for abolishing the emergency law, solving the unemployment and housing problems, upgrading the health services and developing the education system.

=== Controversy ===
In an interview with The Washington Times in July 2011, former Wafd Party vice-chairman Ahmed Ezz el-Arab dismissed The Holocaust as a "lie" (while accepting that the Nazis killed "hundreds of thousands" of Jews, but not 6 million), and the Diary of Anne Frank as a "forgery". Moreover, he claimed that the September 11 attacks were in reality perpetrated by Mossad, the CIA and America's "military–industrial complex", and that Osama bin Laden was an "American agent".

== Prominent party figures ==
- Fuad Serageddin Pasha – the party's first chairman
- Bahaa El-Din Abu Shoka – member of parliament, senator; current chairman of the party, and chairman of the legislative committee in parliament and leader of the party's current parliamentary bloc
- Khaled Kandil – current vice chairman of the party, senator
- Numan Gumaa – former chairman and 2005 presidential candidate
- Monir Fakhri Abdel Nour – long-time serving Coptic parliament member, politician and former party vice chairman
- Muhammed Elwan – one of the founders and long-serving chairman's assistant
- Essam Shiha – member of the supreme committee of the party
- Ahmed Gamal El Segini – member of parliament, current chairman of the committee of local governance
- Hilmi Murad – one of the founding vice presidents

== History ==
=== After 1973 ===
After the end of October War with Israel, and the signing of the Camp David Accords, Egyptian President Anwar Sadat started to accept the return of the multi-party system to the political life in Egypt, after Egypt had been under one-party rule for over 25 years, therefore, Sadat established the Egyptian Arab Socialist Party, where he became its president. In 1976 the Liberal Party was established, which represented the Liberal wing, followed by the Unionist Party, which represented the left wing. Later on Sadat established the National Democratic party. After then there were plans to revive the Wafd Party, led by the efforts of young ambitious Egyptian political figures and Fouad Serag el Deen Pasha.

=== Early years and establishment ===
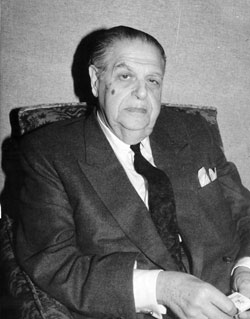
Fouad Serageddin Pasha, the party's founder and leader from 1978 till 2000

In January 1978 Fouad Serageddin requested to allow New Wafd Party to engage into the Egyptian political life freely, which was met by disagreement from the Egyptian authorities and the President. The Egyptian authorities started to spread false news about the corruption of the party, and that New Wafd Party seeks the return of the pre-1952 revolution status. However, New Wafd party was accepted to be established on 4 February 1978, by the Egyptian Partys' Committee. Even though New Wafd party was accepted and could stand legally, the party froze its membership with its own discretion to avoid clashes with the Egyptian President and Authorities, which inevitably took place, which included the detainment of Fouad Serag el Deen, the party's chairman at then, by a decision of the president in September 1981, which included many Egyptian political figures and some founders of New Wafd Party.

Following the assassination of Sadat and the ascension of Hosni Mubarak to presidency, change in Egyptian political life was needed. As a result, Mubarak decided to free all those detained by Anwar Sadat's decisions. Consequently, New Wafd party took the chance its chance for revival, and decided to unfreeze it status, which was rejected by the Egyptian Lawsuits authority, however, New Wafd party challenged such decision and the party was back to political life in 1984.

=== 1984 elections ===
In 1984 Wafd formed an alliance with the Muslim Brotherhood ahead of parliamentary elections, but the results were disappointing as it won only 15% of the vote.

=== 2005–2006 turmoil ===
Early in December 2005 the party appeared to be in crisis following the parliamentary elections, when party chairman Numan Gumaa dismissed prominent party leader and vice chairman Monir Fakhri Abdel Nour following the poor performance the party showed during the elections.

Abdel Nour was also the leader of the opposition bloc in the outgoing parliament before losing his seat in the first stage of elections. Abdel Nour told the media before his dismissal, that the only way the party could improve would be by "changing its leadership". He also continued that there was much support within the party for such a change.

After a poor showing in the 2005 Egyptian presidential elections, the Wafd Party split into two camps, with one group demanding that Gumaa leave his post as chairman. That demand became even more pronounced after the party also did poorly in the parliamentary elections.

Later in December 2005 the party's higher political board reverted Gumaa's decisions on firing Abdel Nour as well as other members. The higher board also held elections for its membership and amended its internal by-laws and rules, especially those that give the party's chairman vast authorities in an aim to trim the chairman's political powers, all of which Gumaa has agreed to support.

On 18 January 2006 the supreme committee for the party ousted its chairman Numan Gumaa from the party and from the presidency of the board of al-Wafd newspaper. The committee attributed its decision to what it called Gumaa's tyrannical behaviour and abuse of authority.

It also appointed his deputy Mahmoud Abaza as an interim chairman for a period of 60 days after which the General Assembly of the party would be invited for an emergency meeting to choose a new chairman.

However, Gumaa contended that this decision contradicted the party's statutes and that he was the legitimate chairman who can be dismissed only by a decision of the party's General Assembly. He responded by filing a complaint with Egypt's Prosecutor General, who ruled that Gumaa should be allowed access to party's headquarters. Abaza filed an urgent lawsuit asking that the Prosecutor General's ruling be overturned.

The party's newspaper Al-Wafd was suspended for thirteen days from 27 January until 8 February 2006 after Gumaa asked Al-Ahram publishing house to stop printing the paper and fired its editor and some journalists, complaining of their allegiance to Abaza's group.

On 10 February 2006, the party's General Assembly agreed to dismiss Gumaa from the Wafd presidency and appointed Mustafa El-Tawil (a member of al-Wafd supreme committee) as an interim president till the next elections in July 2006. Gumaa argued the decision was due to an earlier ruling by Giza's court of first instance to stop the General Assembly meeting.

On 1 April 2006, Gumaa and his supporters occupied the party's headquarters to reclaim control and opened fire on supporters of the rival faction who responded by throwing stones. Twenty three people were injured and fire broke out in the building but was brought under control. Egyptian authorities arrested Gumaa and some of his supporters.

=== 2010 party elections ===
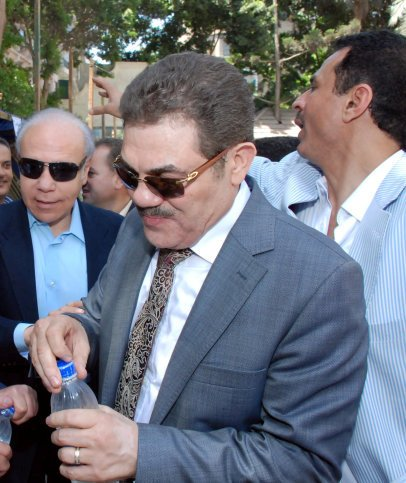
El-Sayyid El-Badawi Shehata, party leader from 2010 till 2018

In May 2010, the party's deputy chairman Fouad Badrawi, grandson of Wafd's late leader Fouad Serageddin announced that he was withdrawing his name from the nominations for party presidency to allow El-Sayyid el-Badawi, a member of the party's supreme authority and the party's former secretary-general, to run instead in the party elections scheduled by the end of the month. In a rare occurrence in Egyptian partisan life, the elections were conducted in a transparent, peaceful manner and characterized by integrity. At its end, it was announced that El-Badawi would be the new party chairman, with the outgoing president standing beside him.

Since his election, El-Badawi has met with many prominent figures in Egyptian life, ranging from politicians, current members of parliament, Muslim and Coptic religious figures and even actors, actresses and football players.

To many observers, Wafd merged as a much stronger party after this election, which would be counted that would once again attract liberals who were losing grip in the current political map to Islamists and other extremists.

=== Role after 2011 revolution ===
After the 2011 Egyptian revolution forced President Hosni Mubarak to announce that he would step down in the coming elections, the government invited opposition parties to participate in dialogue. The party's secretary-general accepted on condition that protesters would not be attacked.

Representatives of the Al-Wafd Party joined anti-Mubarak protesters in Tahrir Square and vowed not to have a dialogue with government officials until Mubarak relinquished his office.

=== 2011–12 parliamentary election ===
Following the 2011 Egyptian revolution, on 13 June 2011 the Wafd Party announced its alliance (the National Democratic Alliance for Egypt) with the Freedom and Justice Party, the political wing of the Islamist Muslim Brotherhood, to present a joint list of candidates for the 2011 parliamentary election. Executive members of Wafd have criticized the cooperation of the secular party with the Islamists. As the date neared for fielding candidate lists, the Wafd decided to participate in the elections independently, and left the Democratic Alliance for Egypt.

In the subsequent parliamentary election, the New Wafd Party won 9.2% of the vote, and 38 seats in the 508-seat parliament. It was the third-most successful party, after the Islamist Freedom & Justice Party with 213 seats, and the more conservative Islamist Al-Nour Party with 107 seats. It had a slim lead over the other main secularist grouping, the Egyptian Bloc.

=== 2015–2020 ===
==== Elections ====
The Wafd Party successfully contested the 2015 parliamentary elections, winning 36 seats, making it the third largest party in parliament. At the time it was led by El-Sayyid el-Badawi, and ran as part of the For the Love of Egypt electoral alliance.

==== Tensions ====
El-Badawi removed various members from the party in 2015, including Badrawi and Essam Shiha, who were leading the Wafd Reform Front, a faction of the party that called for El-Badawi's resignation. Members of the Reform Front accused El-Badawi of "manipulating and squandering the party’s money."

==== Policies ====
The Wafd Party has largely supported the Egyptian Government since the formation of the current parliament. It has strongly backed the economic reform programme embarked on by President Sisi, believing it to be the key to Egypt's successful economic recovery from the 2011 and 2013 revolutions.

In the international arena, the Wafd Party has strongly supported efforts to strengthen ties with other Arab countries, and especially form links with the African continent, in order to regain Egypt's leading and influential position in the African and Arab World, as a strong regional power. Being Egypt's oldest party, and having been set up 100 years ago, the party enjoys a powerful reputation among neighbouring countries, and often sends foreign delegations abroad to campaign for Egypt's interests.

==== 2018 party election ====
In March 2018 Bahaa El-Din Abu Shoka won the internal party elections, becoming chairman of the Wafd Party. He ran against Hossam al-Khouli, the "deputy head of the party", Yasser Hassan, "assistant chairman", and Alaa Shawali, who is the grandson of party leader Saad Zaghloul.

=== 2020–2025 ===
The party joined the National Unified List for Egypt before the 2020 Egyptian parliamentary election.

Nine members of the party were removed in February 2021; they opposed the party cooperating with the Nation's Future Party.

In March 2022 Abdel-Sanad Yamama won party elections and became the chairman of the Wafd Party. He was the party's candidate in the 2023 Egyptian presidential election.

The party had two seats allocated to it as part of the National Unified List for Egypt ahead of the 2025 Egyptian Senate election, which led to the "High Committee" of the party asking him to step aside; Yamama instead called for a vote of confidence, to take place on 27 July. The party won nine elected seats in the 2025 Egyptian parliamentary election.

=== 2026–present ===
The party is expected to hold a leadership election on 30 January 2026. Candidates include Hani Serrieddin and Eid Heikal; El-Sayyid el-Badawi and Bahaa El-Din Abu Shoka registered their candidacies on 5 January. Husseini El-Sharkawy was left out of the race for failing to complete nomination papers, while Yasser Hassan withdrew previously. Abu Shoka left the leadership election on 15 January 2026 and resigned from the party. Other candidates remaining in the race include Hamdy Qotta, and Essam El-Sabbahi. El-Badawi won the election, defeating Serrieddin by eight votes.

== Leaders ==
Leader	Took office	Left office
Fouad Serageddin	?	August 2000
Numan Gumaa	September 2000	?
El-Sayyid el-Badawi	May 2010	n/a
El-Sayyid el-Badawi	April 2014	2018
Bahaa El-Din Abu Shoka	March 2018	2022
Abdel-Sanad Yamama	March 2022	2026
El-Sayyid el-Badawi	January 2026	Present

== Electoral history ==
=== Presidential elections ===
Election	Party candidate	Votes	%	Result
2005	Numan Gumaa	208,891	2.93%	Lost ✗
2023	Abdel-Sanad Yamama	822,606	1.86%	Lost ✗

=== Shura Council elections ===
Election	Seats	+/–
2012	14 / 270	▲14

=== People's Assembly of Egypt elections ===
Election	Party leader	Votes	%	Seats	+/–	Position
1984	Fouad Serageddin	778,131	15.1%	58 / 458	▲58	▲2nd
1987	Fouad Serageddin	746,023	10.9%	35 / 458	▼23	▼3rd
1990	Fouad Serageddin	Boycotted		0 / 454	▼35	
1995	Fouad Serageddin			6 / 454	▲6	▲2nd
2000	Numan Gumaa			7 / 454	▲1	2nd
2005	Mounir Fakhry Abdel Nour		1.3%	6 / 444	▼1	2nd
2010	El-Sayyid el-Badawi		1.1%	6 / 514	Steady	2nd
2011–2012	El-Sayyid el-Badawi	2,480,391	9.2%	38 / 508	▲32	▼3rd

=== House of Representatives elections ===
Election	Party leader	Votes	%	Seats	+/–	Position
2015	El-Sayyid el-Badawi			36 / 596	▼2	3rd
2020	Bahaa El-Din Abu Shoka			25 / 596	▼11	3rd
2025	Abdel-Sanad Yamama			12 / 596	▼13	
