= Mounir Fakhry Abdel Nour =

Egyptian businessman and politician (born 1945)

Monir Fakhry Abdel Nour
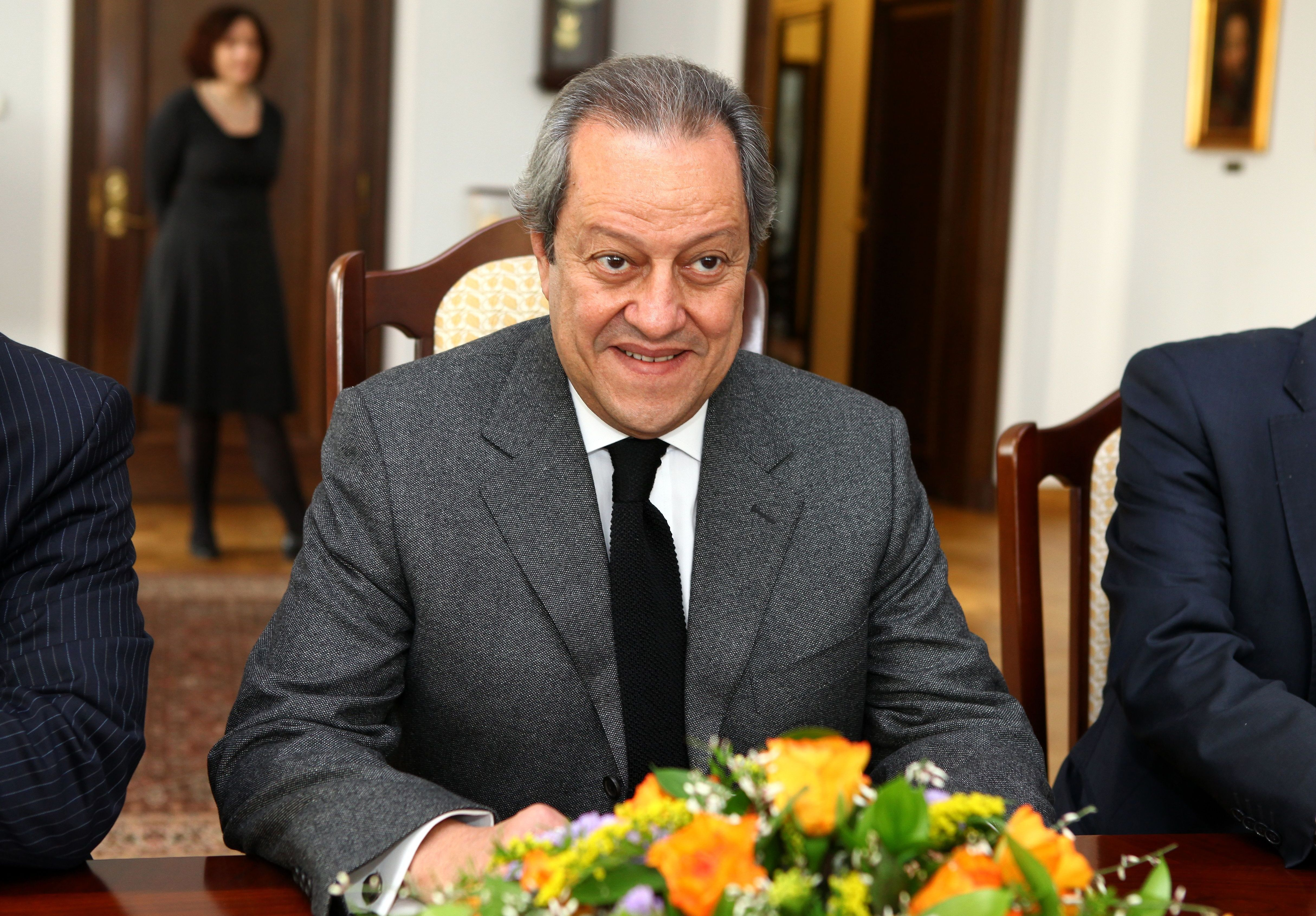

Minister of Industry, Trade and Investment
- In office 16 July 2013 – 19 September 2015
- Prime Minister: Hazem Al Beblawi; Ibrahim Mahlab
- Preceded by: Hatem Saleh
- Succeeded by: Tareq Qabil

Personal details
- Born: 21 August 1945 (age 81)
- Party: Wafd Party
- Education: Cairo University; American University in Cairo
- Religion: Coptic Orthodox Church

Mounir Fakhry Abdel Nour (Arabic: منير فخري عبد النور; born 21 August 1945) is an Egyptian businessman and politician.

== Early life and education ==
Abdel Nour was born into a Coptic Christian family on 21 August 1945. His father, Amin Fakhry Abdel Nour (1912 – 2012), was a Wafdist politician.

He graduated from a French high school in Cairo. He received a bachelor's degree from Cairo University's Faculty of Economics and Political Science. He holds a master's degree from the American University in Cairo (AUC) with a thesis entitled "private foreign investment as a source of economic development."

== Career ==
Abdel Nour is a businessman. He began his career as representative in Egypt and the Middle East for the French bank Banque de l'Union Européenne then joined American Express International Banking Corporation as vice president in Egypt. He later founded Egyptian Finance Company. In 1983 he founded the Egyptian French Company for Agro-Industries (Vitrac Company) He was board member of the Cairo and Alexandria stock exchange, the Federation of Egyptian Industries, the center for economic studies of developing countries at Cairo university.

Abdel Nour then joined politics. He run for office in the 1995 elections, but lost. He won a seat in the 2000 general elections. and was elected head of the opposition in Parliament. Later he was elected secretary-general of the Wafd Party. After 25 January revolution he was appointed minister of tourism in the cabinet led by then prime minister Ahmed Shafiq in February 2011. Abdel Nour succeeded Zoheir Garranah in the post. He remained in his post in the cabinets headed by Essam Sharaf followed by Kamal Ganzouri until 2 August 2012.

He refused to participate in the government of the Muslim Brotherhood headed by Hisham Kandil and joined the opposition. He participated in the founding of the "National Salvation Front" on 23 November 2012 and was later chosen as its Secretary General. In this capacity he was among the organizers of the 30 June 2013 uprising that ended the rule of the Muslim Brotherhood.

In February 2013 he joined the cabinet headed by Ibrahim Mahlab as Minister of Trade, Industry and Investment and will retain the portfolio of Trade and Industry until 18 September 2015. On 16 July 2013, he was appointed as the minister of Industry and Foreign Trade in the interim cabinet headed by prime minister Hazem Al Beblawi.
