= Bahaa El-Din Abu Shoka =

Egyptian lawyer and politician

- بهاء الدين أبو شقة

Chairman of the Wafd Party
- In office April 2018 – March 2022
- Preceded by: El-Sayyid el-Badawi
- Succeeded by: Abdel-Sanad Yamama

Personal details
- Party: New Wafd Party
- Education: Faculty of Law, Cairo University
- Occupation: Chairman

Mohamed Bahaa El-Din Abu Shoka is an Egyptian lawyer and politician. He is a professor of public law, and the former president of the New Wafd Party.

== Career ==
He is the founder of Abou-Shoka Advocates, a Cairo law practice, and was a member of the Shura Council twice.

In August 2010, he spoke out against boycotting the Egyptian parliamentary election, saying that it would be "like committing political suicide".

He was announced as shadow minister of legal affairs in Al Wafd's shadow cabinet.

After Hosni Mubarak stepped down from power in February 2011, Mubarak hired Abu Shoka as one of his defence team.

In May 2012 Abu Shoka questioned the secretive judicial decision to lift a travel ban on foreign NGO workers accused of raising US funds without appropriate government authorization. In mid-June 2012, he was named as a member of the revamped Constituent Assembly of Egypt. Around that time he criticised the constitutionality of the law passed which attempted to bar Ahmed Shafik from standing in the 2012 presidential election.

Abu Shoka was appointed to the House of Representatives by President Abdel Fattah el-Sisi in 2015, one of twenty members of parliament appointed by the President of the Republic. He served as head of the Legislative Committee of the Egyptian Parliament. In 2018 he was voted leader of the Wafd Party, replacing El-Sayyid el-Badawi. He has vowed to transform the Wafd Party into a key player in the Egyptian political scene. Abu Shoka was appointed second deputy speaker of the Egyptian Senate in 2020, alongside Phoebe Fawzy. Abu Shoka ran against Abdel-Sanad Yamama in 2022 for party leadership and lost.

He entered the race for the 2026 party leadership election on 5 January 2026, though he withdrew on 15 January. El-Badawi won the party election.
