= Numan Gumaa =

Egyptian politician

Numan Gumaa (Arabic: نعمان جمعة) (1937–2014) was an Egyptian attorney and politician.

== Career ==
Gumaa was educated in France and was a law professor at the American University in Cairo.

Gumaa was elected chairman of the liberal New Wafd Party on 1 September 2000, succeeding Fouad Serageddin. He was nominated by his party for the 2005 Egyptian presidential election and came in third place.
