= 1990 Egyptian parliamentary dissolution referendum =

- 11 October 1990

Results
Choice	Votes	%
Yes	8,829,606	94.34%
No	530,050	5.66%
Valid votes	9,359,656	98.22%
Invalid or blank votes	169,486	1.78%
Total votes	9,529,142	100.00%
Registered voters/turnout	16,273,616	58.56%

A referendum on an early dissolution of Parliament was held in Egypt on 11 October 1990. The referendum followed the Supreme Constitutional Court ruling that the 1987 elections were unconstitutional as the 1986 electoral law discriminated against independent candidates. The court ruled that any legislation passed after 2 June 1990 would not be valid. In September president Hosni Mubarak announced that a referendum would take place to decide whether Parliament should be dissolved early.

The opposition boycotted the referendum, as their demands for repeal of emergency laws and judicial supervision of polls were not met by the authoritarian Mubarak government.

The proposal was approved by 94% of voters, with a turnout of 59%. After its approval early elections were held on 29 November.

== Results ==
Choice	Votes	%
For	8,829,606	94.34
Against	530,050	5.66
Total	9,359,656	100.00
Valid votes	9,359,656	98.22
Invalid/blank votes	169,486	1.78
Total votes	9,529,142	100.00
Registered voters/turnout	16,273,616	58.56
Source: Direct Democracy
