= 1976 Egyptian parliamentary election =

- 28 October 1976 (first round); 4 November 1976 (second round)
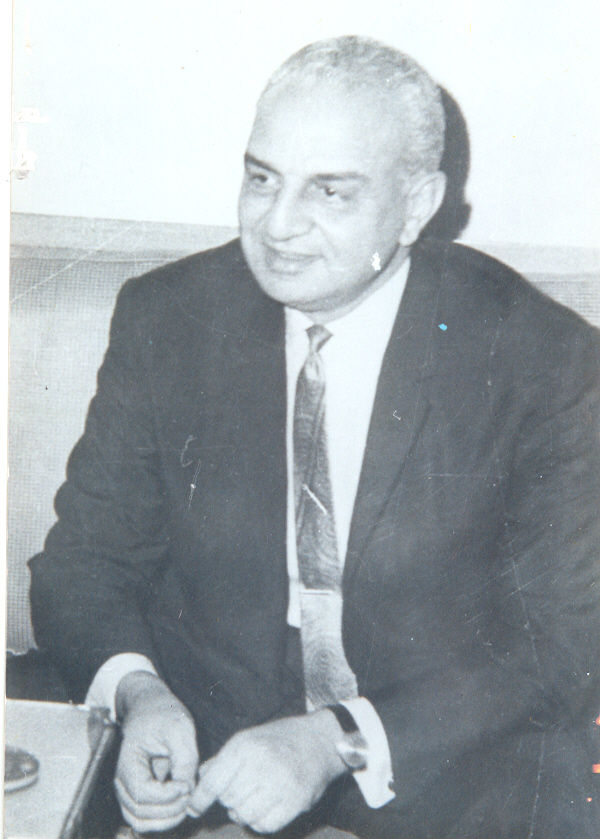

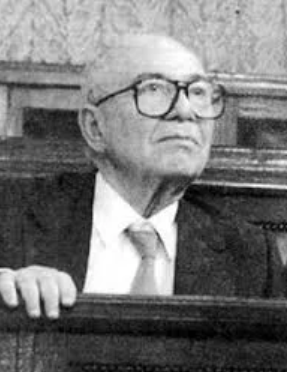
	First party	Second party	Third party
Leader	Mamdouh Salem	Mustafa Kamel Murad	Khaled Mohieddin
Party	Arab Socialist	Liberal Socialist	Tagammu
Seats won	295	15	3
Prime Minister before election
Mamdouh Salem
ASU
Subsequent Prime Minister
Mamdouh Salem
Arab Socialist Organisation

Parliamentary elections were held in Egypt on 28 October 1976, with a second round in four constituencies on 4 November. While the Arab Socialist Union remained the sole legal party in the country, as in previous elections, these elections were unique in having three distinct political factions of the party compete against each other (the right-wing Socialist Liberal Organisation, the centrist Arab Socialist Organisation and the left-wing National Progressive Unionist Party), along with 208 independents. This electoral experiment would lead, in 1979, to Egypt's first multi-party elections since 1950.

Two candidates were elected from each of the 175 constituencies, with a second round of voting required if one or both of the candidates failed to win over 50% of the vote in the first round, or neither of the candidates with over 50% were classed as a worker or farmer (each constituency had to have at least one farmer or worker representing it). Following the election, a further ten members were appointed by the President.

The result was a victory for the Arab Socialist Organisation, which won 295 of the 360 seats. Voter turnout was just 39.77%.

== Results ==
Party	Votes	%	Seats
Arab Socialist Organisation			295
Liberal Socialist Organisation			15
National Progressive Unionist Rally Organisation			3
Independents			47
Total			360
Total votes	3,803,973	–	
Registered voters/turnout	9,564,482	39.77	
Source: IPU
