= Khaled Kandil =

Egyptian senator (born 1963)

- خالد قنديل
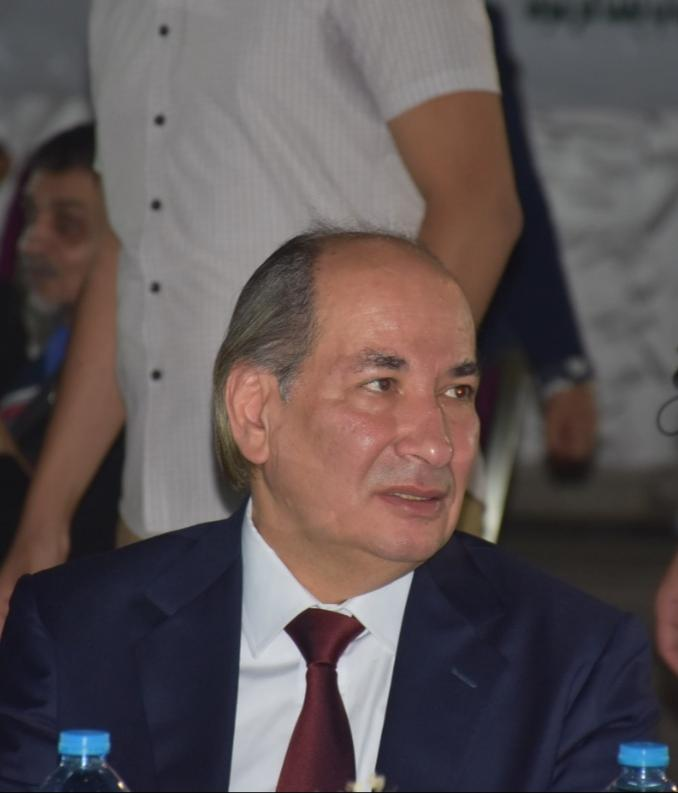

Senator
- Incumbent
- Assumed office October 2020

Personal details
- Born: Khaled Mohamed Abdel-Mon'em Kandil; 20 November 1963 (age 62)
- Education: Cairo University
- Profession: Pharmacist

Dr. Khaled Kandil (born 20 November 1963) is an Egyptian senator and Vice President of the Al-Wafd Party. He is also the founder of Hali Pharm and Tiba Pharma for the export, trade and distribution of medicines.

== About ==
Dr. Khaled Kandil received a bachelor's degree from the Faculty of Pharmacy, Cairo University in 1986, a clinical pathology diploma from Cairo University in 1989, a master's degree in microbiology from Alexandria University, a diploma in non-governmental organizations management from the Faculty of Economics and Political Science, Cairo University, in addition to a bachelor's degree in law from Cairo University in 2002. He works in the field of medicine as the founder of Hali Pharm Company and Tiba Pharma for the export, trade and distribution of medicines.

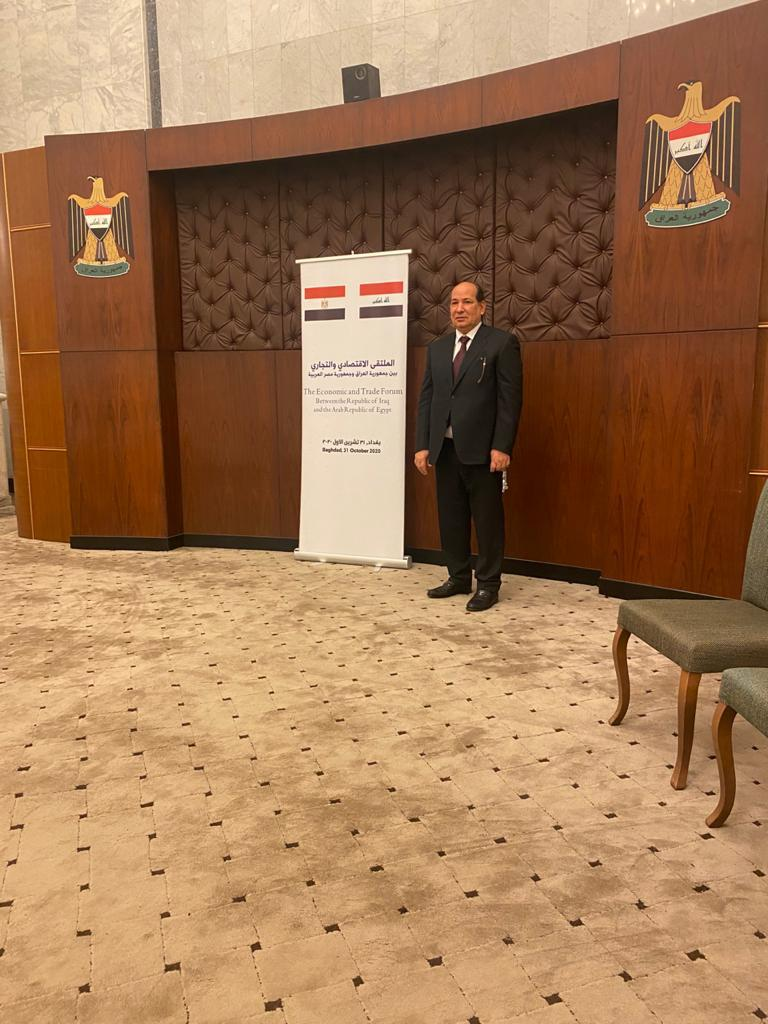
Egyptian Senator Khaled Kandil in Republic of Iraq during The Economic and Trade Forum between Egypt and Iraq

Dr. Kandil writes for Egyptian newspapers and websites such as Al-Ahram, Al-Watan, Sada Al-Balad and others.

== Party activity ==
On 20 November 2018, Dr. Kandil joined the Supreme Authority of the Egyptian New Wafd Party after winning the elections for the party's Supreme Authority in the same month. He took over the presidency of the party's Supreme Committee for Economic Affairs, and in February 2020 Kandil became deputy head of the New Wafd Party.

== Senate membership ==
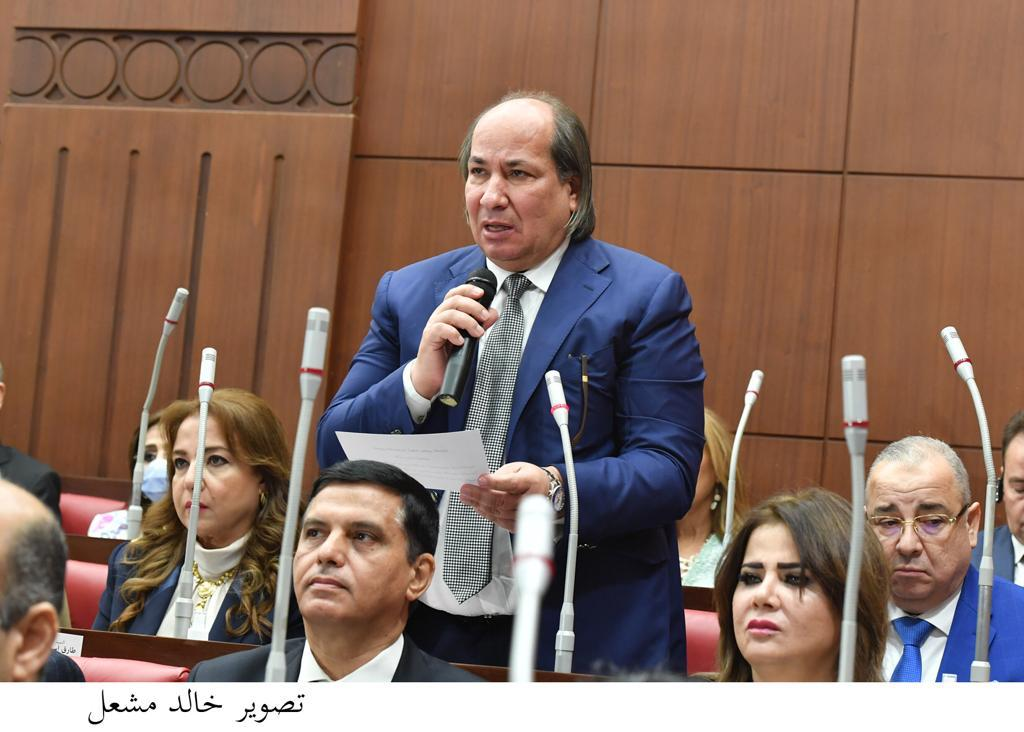
Dr. Khaled Kandil is sworn in as a Senator of the Egyptian Senate

On 14 October 2020, Egyptian President Abdel Fattah el-Sisi issued a decree appointing Dr. Kandil as a member of the Senate among 100 others according to the constitution, and on 18 October 2020, he was sworn in as a member of the Egyptian Senate.

== Charitable contributions ==
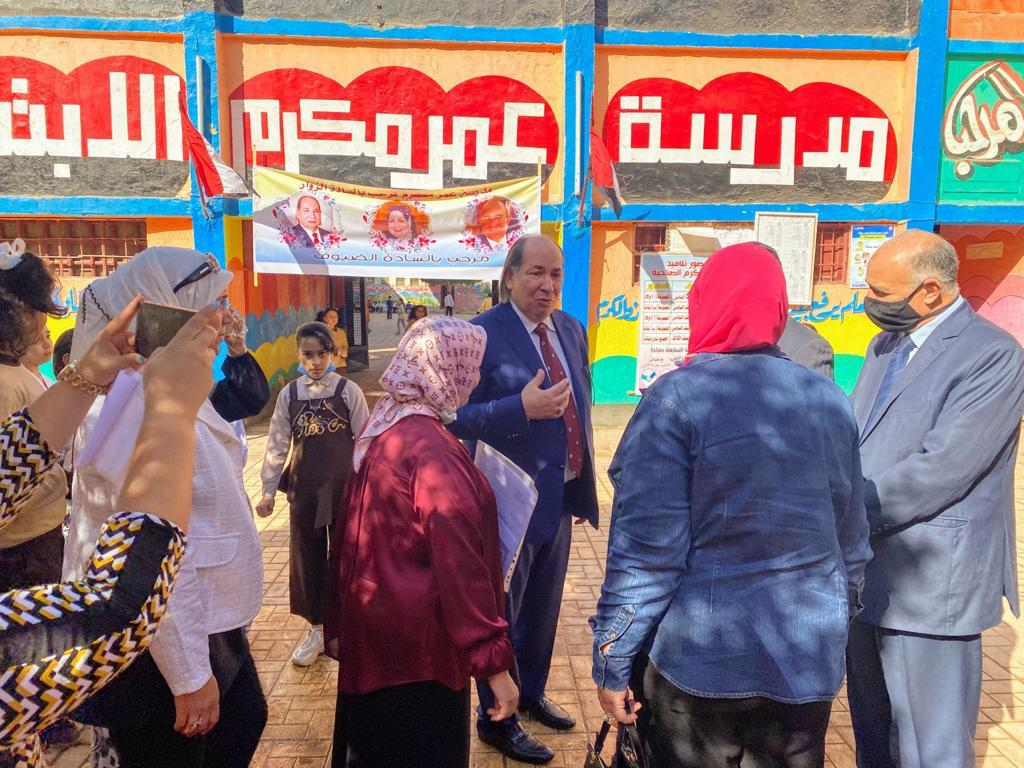
Senator Khaled Kandil in Omar Makram Primary School

On 5 November 2020, Senator Kandil decided to donate an amount of 150,000 pounds as a personal contribution to pay school fees for nearly 350 students in El-Beheira, whose circumstances stumbled and prevented them from fulfilling their educational requirements.
