= Abdel-Sanad Yamama =

Egyptian politician and lawyer

- عبد السند يمامة
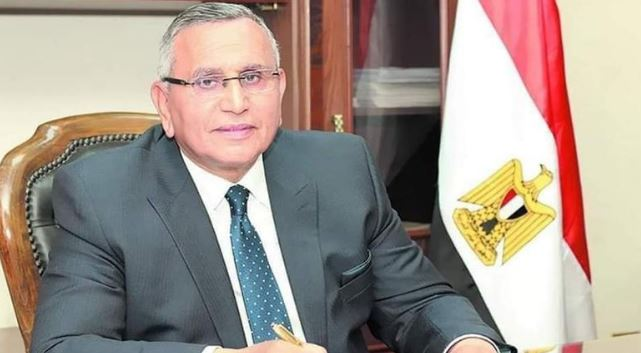
- Yamama in 2025

Chairman of the Wafd Party
- In office March 2022 – January 2026
- Preceded by: Bahaa El-Din Abu Shoka
- Succeeded by: El-Sayyid el-Badawi

Personal details
- Born: 1951 or 1952
- Party: Egyptian Wafd Party (New Wafd Party)
- Education: Faculty of Law, Cairo University (B.A., 1947); University of Nancy, France (Ph.D., 1988)
- Occupation: Politician; lawyer; professor of international law
- Known for: Liberal political leadership; 2023 presidential candidate; electoral program emphasizing economic, legislative, educational reform and Nile rights

Abdel-Sanad Yamama (Arabic: عبد السند يمامة; born 1951 or 1952) is an Egyptian politician, lawyer and professor of international law who served as the leader of the Egyptian Wafd Party from 2022 until 2026.

== Career ==
He was elected the head of the party in 2022, defeating his sole opponent and predecessor, Bahaa El-Din Abu Shoka.

Yamama was his party's candidate in the 2023 Egyptian presidential election. Yamama had four planks in his electoral program: reforming the economy, legislature, education and securing the country's Nile water rights. He came in last in the election.
