= Ahmed Gamal El Segini =

Egyptian engineer, businessman and politician

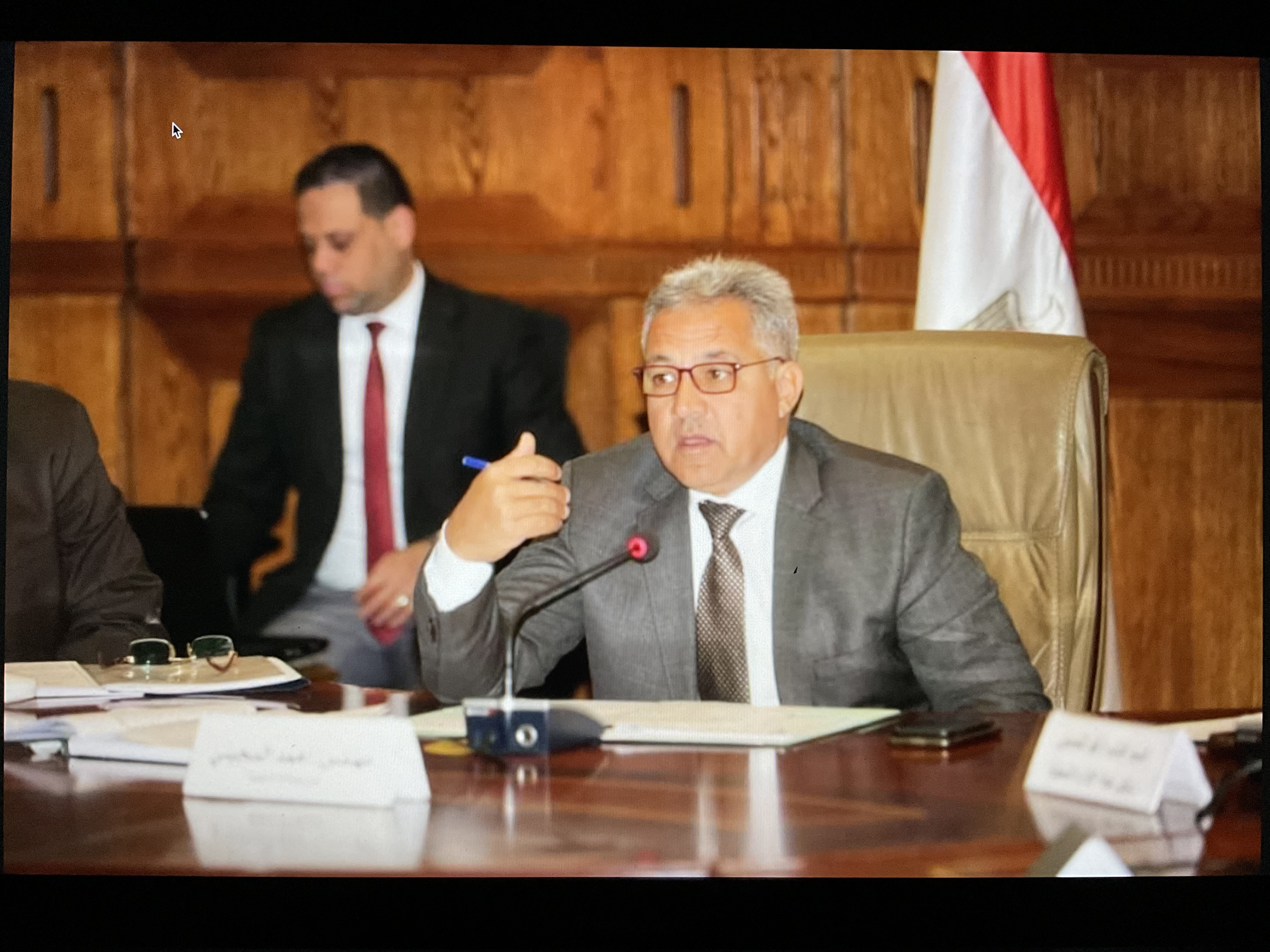

Ahmed Gamal Hafez El Segini (Arabic: أحمد جمال حافظ السجيني) is an Egyptian engineer, businessman, member of parliament and politician. El Segini is a member of the Wafd party one of Egypt's oldest political parties and he is one of its parliamentarians in Egypt's House of representatives. El Segini is also the chairman of parliament's local government committee. El Segini ran for office in Egypt's Egyptian parliamentary election representing Wafd on For the Love of Egypt electoral list which ardently supported the administration of President Abd El-Fattah El-Sisi. The list swept the elections with a landslide and El Segini was elected as a member of Egypt's house of representatives. Later El Segini was elected to lead the parliamentary committee on local government which is currently drafting the local government legislation that happens to be a prerequisite to holding the long-awaited municipal elections which haven't been held since even before the Egyptian revolution of 2011. In 2018 El Segini resigned from the Wafd Party and joined Nation's Future Party which currently holds the majority of seats in Egypt's parliament.

Ahmed Gamal Hafez Al Segini belongs to one of Egypt's influential families, the Segini family, and among his relatives are, Abdel Raouf Al Segini, the ninth Grand Imam of al-Azhar, renowned Egyptian sculptor Gamal El Segini, Egyptian sculptor Zainab Al Segini, former deputy of the minister of interior General Ashraf Al Segini.
