= Phoebe Fawzy =

Egyptian politician

- فيبي فوزي

Second Deputy Speaker of the Senate (Egypt)
- Incumbent
- Assumed office 18 October 2020

Personal details
- Party: Republican People's Party

Phoebe Fawzy Girgis is a journalist, women's activist and politician who serves as Second Deputy Speaker of the Egyptian Senate. Winning office on the Republican People's Party ticket at the 2020 Egyptian Senate elections, she is the first Coptic woman to serve in the parliament.

Girgis is from the Suez Canal city of Ismailia. Her father was a university professor. In 1983, she earned a degree in media and mass communications from Cairo University. She developed a career in media journalism, and became the youngest editor-in-chief on Egyptian TV at the time. She is also an Arabic-English translator. She became a news director at Canal TV.
