= 2005 Egyptian parliamentary election =

- 9 November – 7 December 2005

444 of the 454 seats in the People's Assembly 223 seats needed for a majority
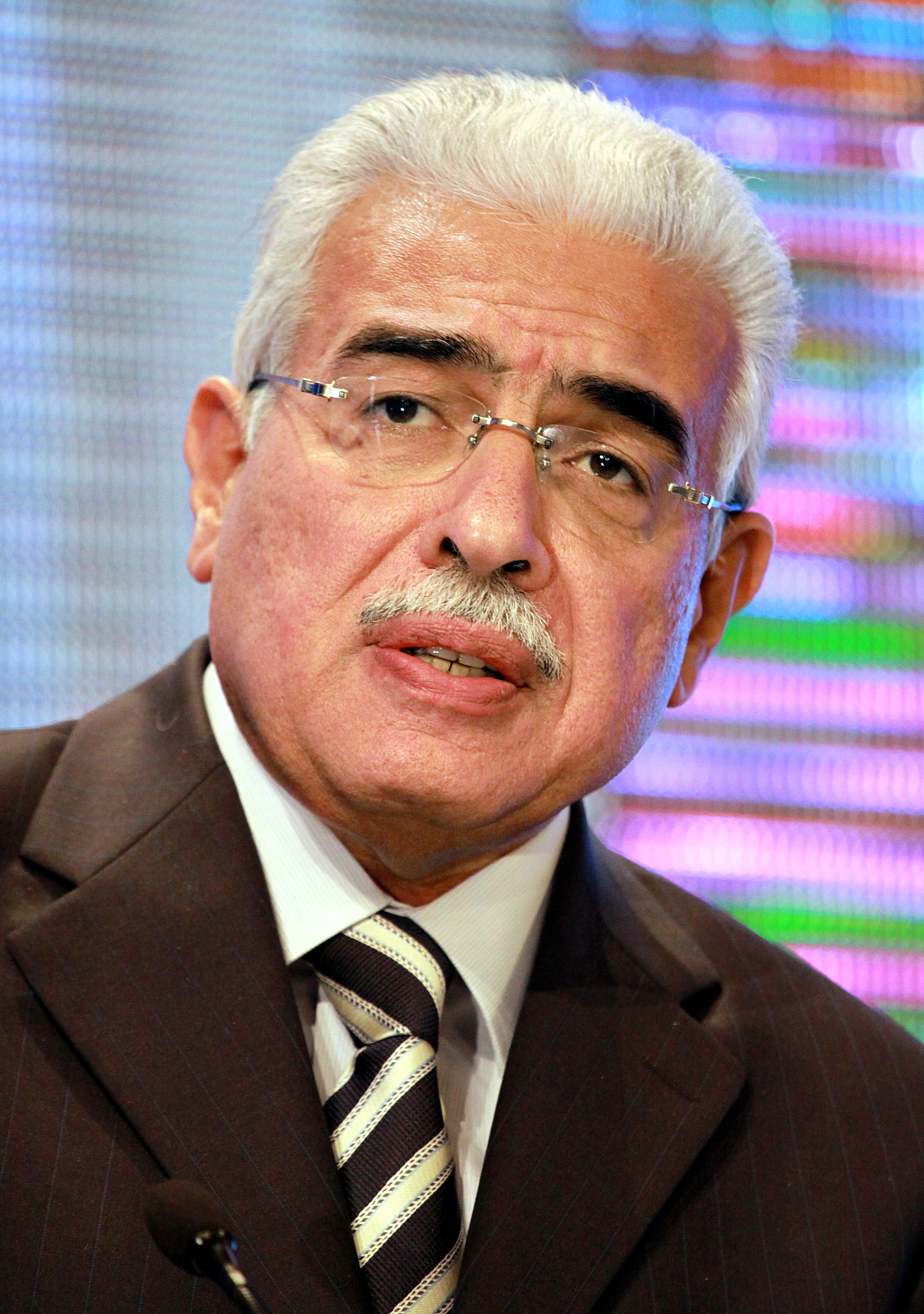

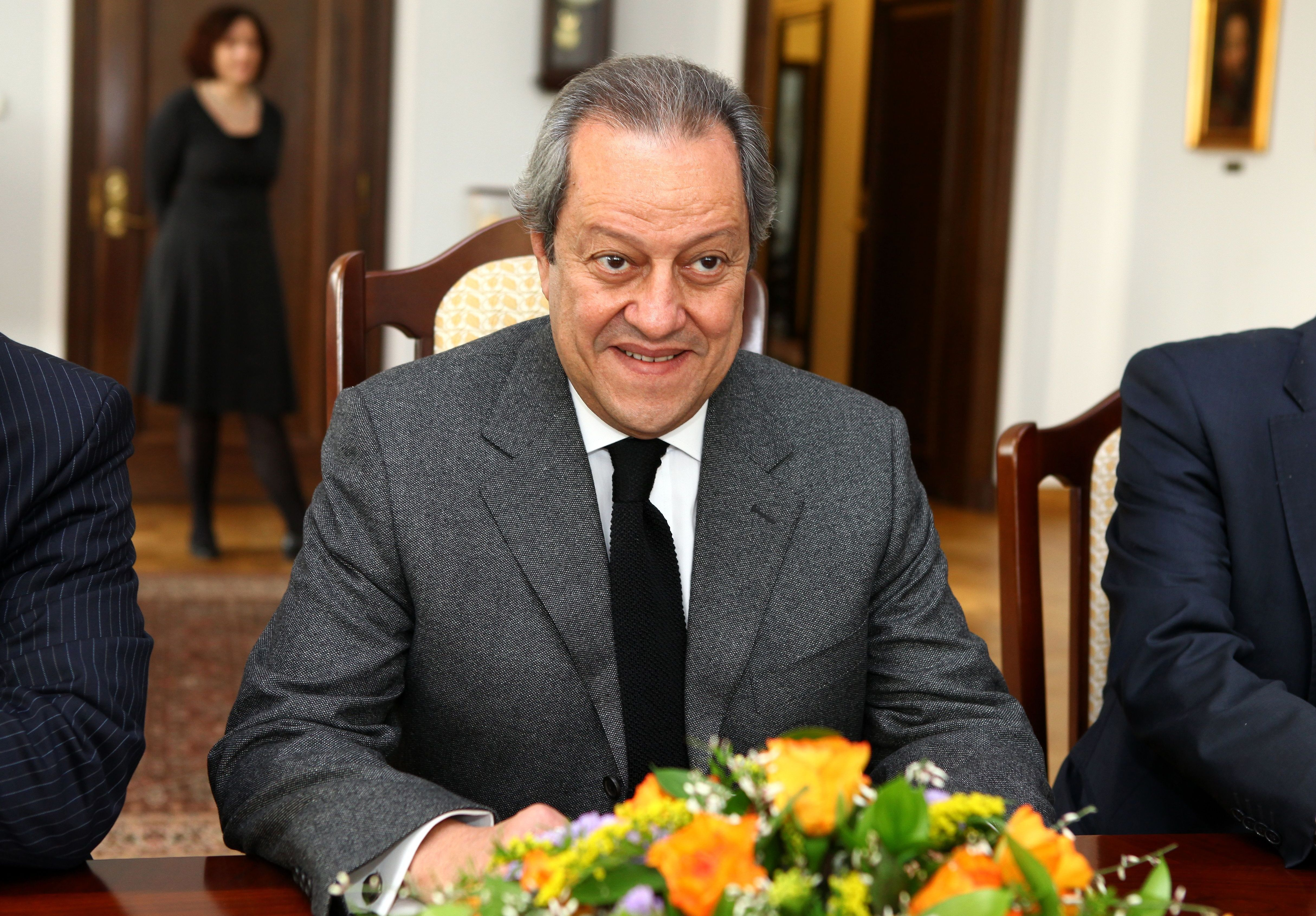
	First party	Second party
Leader	Ahmed Nazif	Mounir Fakhry Abdel Nour
Party	NDP	New Wafd
Seats won	324	6
Prime Minister before election
Atef Ebeid
NDP
Subsequent Prime Minister
Ahmed Nazif
NDP

Parliamentary elections were held by the authoritarian Hosni Mubarak regime in Egypt in three-stage elections in November and December 2005 to elect 444 of the 454 members of the People's Assembly. The elections formed the Eighth Assembly since the adoption of the 1971 Constitution. A total of 5,267 candidates competed in 222 constituencies for the Assembly's 444 elected seats.

The elections were married by electoral violence, as 12 citizens died, with hundreds injured or arrested.

They came only two months after the first multi-candidate presidential elections in Egypt's history, the previous voting procedure being by referendum. Although the ruling National Democratic Party (NDP) maintained its majority and control of the Assembly with 311 seats (72%), unprecedented gains were made by the Muslim Brotherhood who took 88 seats, while the rest of the opposition took 24 seats. Ten further seats are appointed by the president, while 12 were still undecided at the end of the final round awaiting court rulings.

Further importance is attached to these elections as a party must achieve 5% of the seats in the Assembly to field a candidate in the next Egyptian presidential elections in 2011.

== Electoral system ==
The election process ran in the three stages from November 7 to December 9, 2005 using single member plurality, with over 32 million registered voters in the 222 constituencies. Official registration for the candidates began on October 12, 2005.

The role of the police is restricted to maintaining peace and order at the polling stations without interference in the voting process or entering the voting stations.

The first stage was held on Wednesday November 9, with run-off elections on Tuesday November 15 with 10.7 million registered voters covering 8 Egyptian governorates: Cairo, Giza, al-Minufiyah, Bani Suwayf, Asyut, al-Minya, Matruh and al-Wadi al-Jadid

The second stage was held on Sunday November 20, with run-off elections on Saturday November 26 with 10.5 million registered voters covering 9 Egyptian governorates: Alexandria, al-Buhayrah, al-Isma'iliyah, Bur Sa'id, as-Suways, al-Qalyubiyah, al-Gharbiyah, al-Fayyum and Qina.

The third stage was held on December 1, with run-off elections on Wednesday December 7 with 10.6 million registered voters covering 9 Egyptian governorates: ad-Daqahliyah, ash-Sharqiyah, Kafr ash Shaykh, Dimyat, Suhaj, Aswan, al-Bahr al-Ahmar, South Sinai and North Sinai.

== Contesting parties ==
The 2000 parliamentary election resulted in the following seat distribution in the Seventh Assembly:

- National Democratic Party (NDP) – 417
- New Wafd Party – 6
- National Progressive Unionist Rally Party – 5
- Arab Democratic Nasserist Party – 1
- Liberal Party – 1
- Independents – 14
- Non-Elected Members – 10

Initially the NDP scored only 40% of the seats, but many independents switched their political affiliation back to NDP giving it its soaring majority.

== Campaign ==
Officially, the campaign period starts immediately after the announcement of the final list of candidates and ends one day before election day. In case of run-offs, it restarts the day following the results day to end the day before election day. Campaign expenditures are limited to not more than £E70,000, with restrictions of any foreign financial assistance or endorsements. Restrictions are also put on using public utilities (transportation, buildings, public sector companies, as well as companies with government-owned shares).

== Conduct ==
The official monitors of the elections are the judiciary and the governmental National Council for Human Rights (NCHR). Over 30 human rights organizations, civil society groups and NGOs pledged to monitor the elections. The judiciary asked the civil society organizations to form a "National Authority for monitoring elections" that would monitor the elections. Also this authority would replace the wooden ballot boxes with transparent ones (this was done this year), put surveillance cameras inside the polling stations that would provide constant monitoring of the election process (currently under study and is done partially by the media) and to air the vote count live on state television.

Mubarak's regime attempted to tightly control the parliamentary elections in favour of his NDP, where a range of violations were recorded and many people were killed. One human rights organisation observed how police security forces closed 100 polling stations in four Governorates (Al-Sharqia, Al-Daqahlia, Damiatta, Kafr El Sheikh), where they also prevented supporters of opposition candidates from entering stations that remained open, while allowing NDP supporters in (Al-Bahrian School, Abu Hamaad Constituency, Al-Sharqia Governorate, Rafah poll station (second Constituency), North Sinai Governorate. In the second phase run-off elections, 26 polling stations were closed down in five Governorates (Alexandria, Port Said, Fayoum, Al-Behira and Qena).

In the second and third rounds, lines of police officers in riot gear blockaded numerous polling stations in Muslim Brotherhood strongholds, where supporters fought back, hurling stones and molotov cocktails. In one day, security forces killed eight people, while over the course of the elections hundreds of voters were wounded and more than 1000 arrested, mainly supporters of the Brotherhood. By the end of the elections the overall death toll stood at 13.

== Results ==
Party	Votes	%	Seats	+/–
National Democratic Party			324	–29
New Wafd Party			6	–1
Dignity Party			2	New
El-Ghad Party			2	New
National Progressive Unionist Rally Party			2	–4
Muslim Brotherhood independents			88	+71
Independents			8	–47
Presidential appointees			10	0
Vacant			12	–
Total			454	0
Valid votes	8,488,358	96.56		
Invalid/blank votes	302,350	3.44		
Total votes	8,790,708	100.00		
Registered voters/turnout	31,253,417	28.13		
Source: IRI, IFES

On 12 December 2005 President Mubarak appointed ten members of the Assembly. Of the appointed, five are men, five are women and four of them are Copts. The appointed members were:

- Mohamed Dakrouri, Advisor to the President
- Ahmed Omar Hashem, former chairman of Al-Azhar University
- Edward Ghali El-Dahabi, lawyer
- Ramzi El-Shaer, former president of Zagazig University and professor of constitutional law
- Iskandar Ghattas, assistant to the Justice Minister
- Zeinab Radwan, former dean of Cairo University's faculty of Arab and Islamic Studies (Became Deputy Speaker)
- Georgette Sobhi, member of National Council for Women
- Ibrahim Habib, chairman of the Real Estate Registration Authority (Notary Public)
- Siadah Ilhami, sociologist
- Sanaa El-Banna, chairman of the Petrochemical Holding Company
