= Al-Wafd =

Daily newspaper published by the Wafd party in Giza, Egypt

Al-Wafd الوفد
- Type: Daily
- Format: Broadsheet
- Owner: Wafd Party
- Publisher: Wafd Party
- Founded: 1984; 42 years ago
- Political alignment: Opposition (Centre-right, National liberalism, Egyptian nationalism)
- Headquarters: Dokki, Giza, Egypt
- Website: Al Wafd

Al-Wafd (Arabic: الوفد meaning the Mission in English) is the daily newspaper published by the Wafd party in Giza, Egypt.

== History and profile ==
Al-Wafd was launched in 1984. As the house organ of the liberal-democratic neo-Wafd party, the paper is considered an opposition paper, although both party and paper have oscillated between support and opposition for the regime.

It is one of the highest circulated papers among those dailies owned by a political party in the country. The paper sold more than half a million copies in the 1990s. The circulation of the daily in 2000 was 600,000 copies.

Mohamed Ali Ibrahim was named as the editor-in-chief of the paper in 2005. Then Abbas Al Tarabili served as the editor-in-chief until February 2009. During the Egyptian revolution in 2011 Osama Heikal was the editor-in-chief. He was appointed information minister in July 2011.

The paper has also an online version, called Al Wafd Gate.

== Controversy ==
Abbas Al Tarabili, then chief editor of the daily, was fired in February 2009 due to low circulation rates that were between 9,000 and 10,000.

On 4 September 2013, the paper portrayed Barack Obama as Satan due to his support for opposition forces in Syria.

== See also ==
- List of newspapers in Egypt
