= 2010 Egyptian parliamentary election =

- 29 November 2010

508 of the 518 seats in the People's Assembly
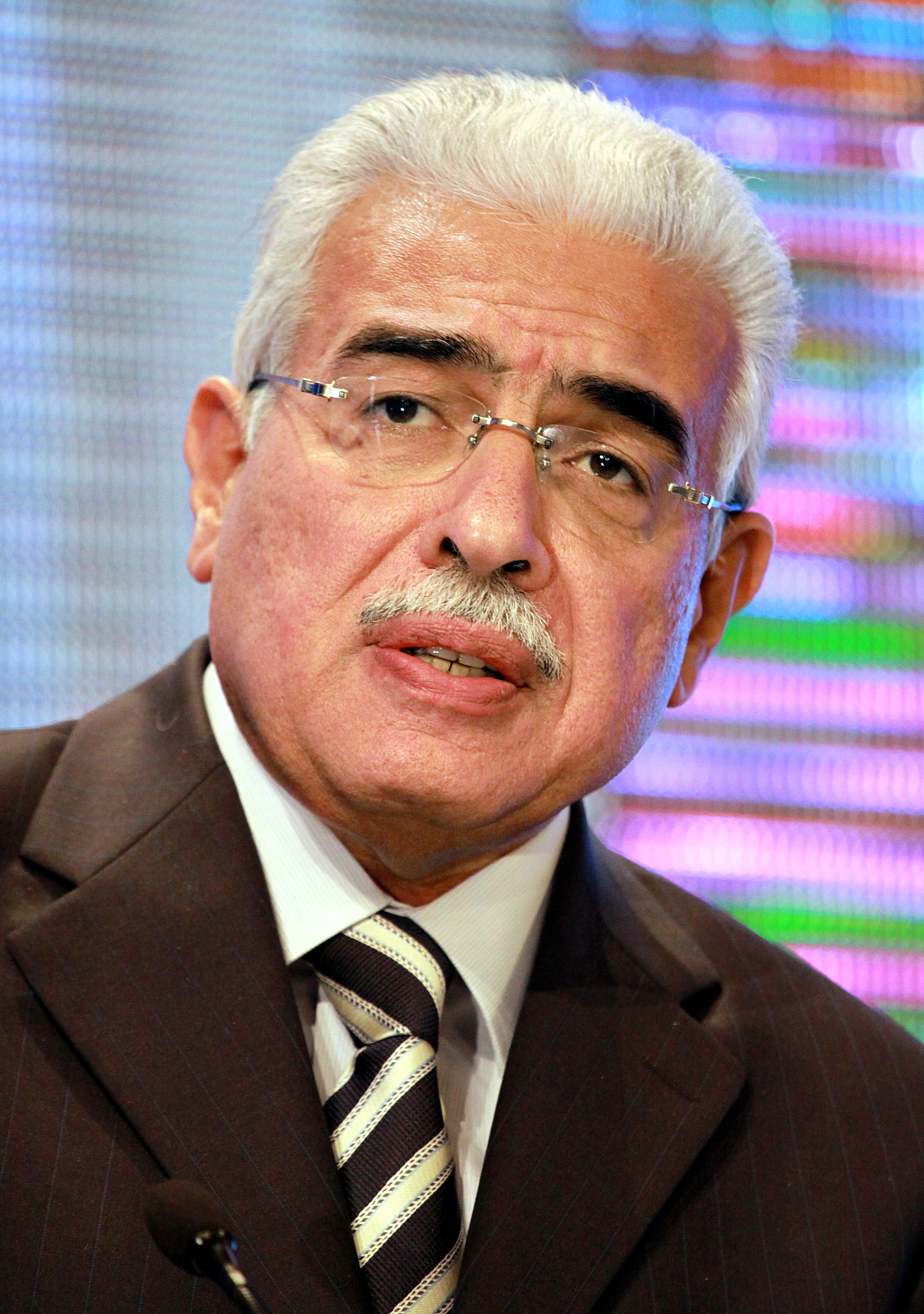

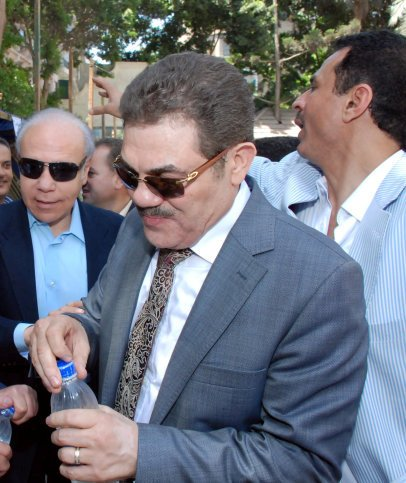
| | First party | Second party |
|---|---|---|
| Leader | Ahmed Nazif | El-Sayyid el-Badawi |
| Party | NDP | New Wafd |
| Last election | 324 | 6 |
| Seats won | 424 | 6 |
| Seat change | ▲100 | Steady |
Prime Minister before election
Ahmed Nazif
NDP
Elected Prime Minister
Ahmed Shafik
Independent

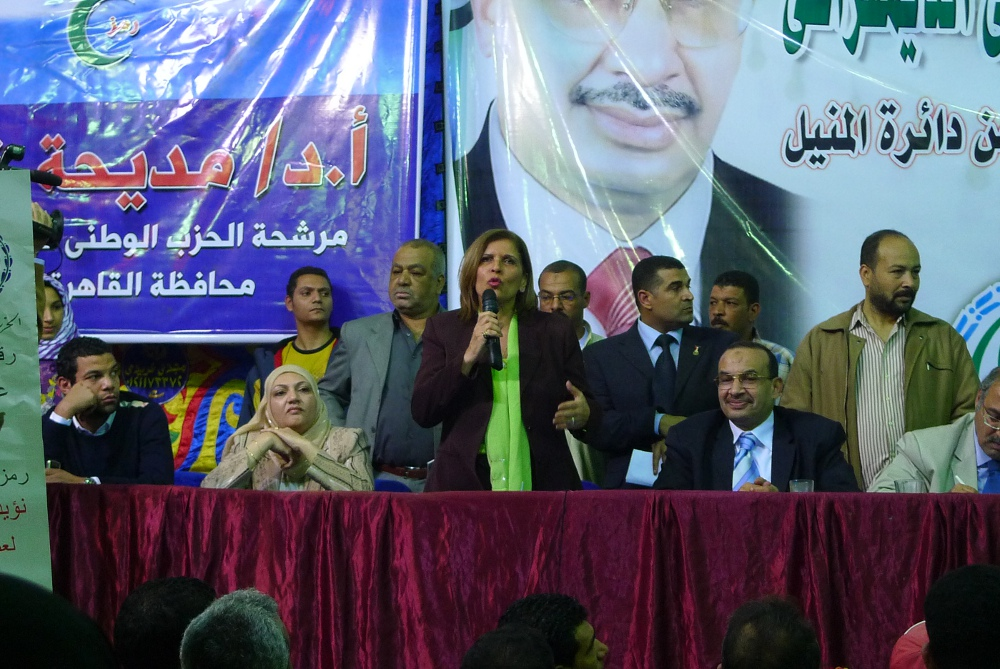
Mediha Khattab, a woman running for a NDP female quota seat, delivers a speech at a rally in the Old Cairo neighborhood.

Parliamentary elections were held in Egypt in 2010. The first stage was held on 28 November 2010 and the second round was held on 5 December 2010.

The election was scheduled in two stages to form the Ninth Assembly since the adoption of the 1971 Constitution. 444 ordinary seats were contested with 64 additional seats reserved for women, while the president appointed 10 members, making a total of 518 seats.

Human rights groups said the election was the "most fraudulent ever" in Egypt's history. It is considered to have been a factor in the Egyptian Revolution that occurred shortly afterwards in early 2011.

== Background ==
This election follows the Muslim Brotherhood completing the five-year parliamentary term in which it held on as the largest-ever minority bloc.

== Electoral system ==
The election process will run in the three stages single member plurality, with millions of registered voters in the 222 constituencies.

Most of the political parties in Egypt have been advocating for a Party-list while the NPD insisted on the Single member plurality.

The election is the first election were 64 additional seats reserved for women.

== Campaign ==
Nomination for the poll commenced on 3 November.

The Muslim Brotherhood said it would compete in the elections despite calls for a boycott. Mohammed Badie, the new chief of the party, said they would contest 30 percent of the seats. It was also termed the "best-organised counterweight to Mubarak's National Democratic Party."

A former adviser to the Muslim Brotherhood, Abdel Hamid al-Ghazaly, said that while the party had brokered a deal with the governing National Democratic Party during the 2005 parliamentary election, no such deal would be agreed to this year. He also said Egyptians voted Brotherhood in 2005 to show their dissatisfaction with the ruling regime. "They weren’t necessarily fond of us. [But] we have no political life whatsoever, thanks to the regime. We can’t even be compared with the most backward countries of the world. Participation in this year’s parliamentary election is the only hope for the Muslim Brothers to get out of the predicament they are in." A Tagammu party member, Abul Ez al-Hariri, also suggested the deals that the opposition parties signed resulted in a loss of credibility and consequent inability to play an effective role in politics. "They have become advocates of the regime."

Opposition groups and civil society activists issued a list of demands:

- Amendment of Article 76 of the Constitution to make it easier for party and independent candidates to get on the presidential ballot.
- Amendment of Article 77 to establish term limits for the presidency, which were removed from the Constitution in 1981.
- Amendment of Article 88 to restore full judicial supervision of elections. This would help tame election fraud and vote rigging, which are common in Egyptian elections.
- Amendment of Law 177 of 2005 in order to facilitate the formation of new political parties.
- Amendment of Article 179: Amendments in 2007 to Article 179 included an "anti-terrorism" measure, which allows for arbitrary arrest, searches and wiretapping without warrant, and transfer of any civilian court case of the president’s choosing to military tribunals. Unlike the Emergency law, it is a permanent measure and not a temporary measure requiring parliamentary approval.

In the Spring 2010, Mohamed ElBaradei began circulating a petition in the runup to the election calling for 7 specific reforms:

1. End the state of emergency.
2. Ensure full judicial supervision of elections.
3. Provide for domestic and international monitoring of elections.
4. Ensure that all candidates have sufficient access to the media, particularly during the presidential election campaign.
5. Allow Egyptians abroad to vote through embassies and consulates.
6. Work toward a political system built on democracy and social justice.
7. Provide the right to nomination for political office without obstacles, in accordance with Egypt’s obligations under the International Convention on Civil and Political Rights; limit the president to two terms.
8. Allow voting by national identification card. These measures will require amending articles 76, 77, and 88 of the Constitution as soon as possible.

== Boycotts ==
Mohamed ElBaradei, a potential presidential candidate, called for a boycott of the election.

The El-Ghad Party became the second party to boycott the elections. The New Wafd Party ignored boycott calls saying in its party paper that it would run in the elections.

The Muslim Brotherhood, however, disavowed boycott calls from other opposition allies, which the party leadership said the decision was made by consensus. Some people lauded the decision as the "most effective way to counter Egypt's gerrymandered electoral system," and that there was a "practical advantage" by gaining seats in parliament. Some party members, however, said the decision not to boycott was a mistake, while others said it was a "missed opportunity" and reflective of "internal strife [that] indicates the dearth of creative strategic thinkers."

The Muslim Brotherhood and the Wafd party called for a boycott of the runoff election.

== Conduct ==
The election was criticised as being a "sham."

=== State of Emergency ===
President Mubarak promised in 2005 that he would put in place a counter terrorism law that would eliminate the need for the state of emergency that has been in place continuously since Sadat’s assassination in 1981. In 2010, he then renewed the state of emergency. The Egyptian government has long claimed that such powers are used only against suspected terrorists and drug dealers but in fact they have also been used against nonviolent political opponents of the regime.

=== Candidate ban ===
The ruling National Democratic Party (NDP)'s recent decision to ban three of its parliamentary candidates from standing in 2010 parliamentary election has kicked up a storm of speculation.

The three candidates to be banned are Daker Abdel Lah, who had been running for the professional seats in Manshiet Nasser and Gamaliya; Islam Medhat, who had been running for the professional seats in the Abdeen and Moski constituencies; and Ayman Taha, who had been running for seats reserved for workers in the Bolak Abu al-Eila constituency.

=== Monitoring ===
The election would not to be under the supervision of any national court or international monitors. The General-Secretary of the Policy Committee in the National Democratic Party Gamal Mubarak said: "This issue is governed by the law and the constitution which made it possible for civil society organizations to monitor the elections". The Secretary of Education in the NDP, Mohamed Kamal, said that the party welcomes the supervision of national organisations, but refuses international monitoring. He also claimed that the abolition of judicial supervision of elections does not affect the integrity of the elections. But there are concerns by the opposition that the persistence of the regime in power, who was not prepared to give up power under any circumstance was a major obstacle in the way of democracy. Abdel Moneim Sayyid, chairman of Al-Ahram and a member of the Policy Committee of the National Party, said that "the regime will not relinquish its grip on power even if it means holding fraudulent elections."

معظم دول العالم لا يوجد فيها إشراف قضائي على الانتخابات ومع ذلك تكون نزيهة وحيادية
"Most of the world has no judicial supervision on elections, however, those elections are fair and impartial."

The Committee to Protect Journalists expressed concern about the deterioration of press freedom in lead up to the election. Reporters without Borders also placed Egypt in the bottom 35 of 175 countries regarding press freedom. While, local journalists said the government has cracked down harder on the press.

Egypt also criticised an American request to send international observers.

=== State control ===
Over a month before the elections, the National Telecommunications Regulatory Authority said the private media would have to obtain licences from the Ministry of Information and the Supreme Press Council to send out SMS. For opposition this was a hindrance to mobilise supporters, and that this "clampdown on mass communication" sought to prevent coordination for the election. On 19 October, Egypt suspended the licenses of 12 more channels, after a previous ban on 5 stations. The Information Minister, Annas el-Fiqi, said the ban was for "corrective measures" to protect viewers from the offending channels. This was seen as a further crackdown on the media and the Muslim Brotherhood.

=== Arrests ===
Several Muslim Brotherhood members were arrested while putting up posters for a female candidate signalling an "attempt to silence the Islamic group." The Interior Ministry alleged that the arrests for violations against the ban on religious slogans from being part of any election campaign. On 19 November, Mena el-Bussal, an independent but Brotherhood-affiliated candidate, led a rally that was disrupted by police. Several hundred members and supporters of the Muslim Brotherhood were arrested.

=== Violence ===
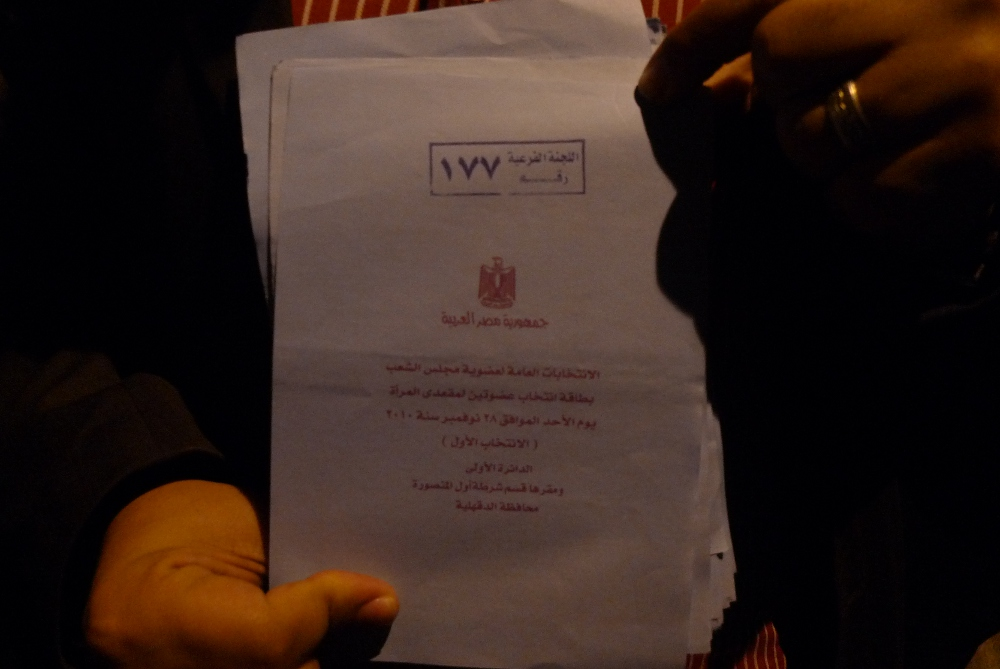
A supporter of the Muslim Brotherhood at a protest on election night in Mansoura displays the official government stamp on ballots that he said were removed from a polling station earlier in the day by a monitor from another political party to demonstrate how easy it was to manipulate the electoral process. The stamp appeared to indicate which box the ballot had been removed from.

Nine people were killed in election day violence.

=== Fraud allegations ===
Police forcefully dispersed more than 1,000 people seeking to observe the vote-counting process in Mahalla. The following day, protests continued in Egypt.

Allegations of fraud on election day including vote buying, illegal campaigning at polling stations, exclusion of opposition supporters, especially those supporting the Muslim Brotherhood, and discarded votes are surfacing after 28 November 2010 election.

== Results ==
Early results from the first stage showed the MB had not made any gains to its one-fifth position, with the ruling NDP consolidating its two-thirds majority in parliament. The MB and other rights groups accused the NDP of "fraud and thuggery" to win. Essam Elerian, a MB spokesman, said that though the party "lost seats and a much deserved representation in the parliament...we won people's love and support and a media battle that exposed [irregularities in] the elections." He also called the "clear vote-rigging an obvious election scandal by all measures." The United States expressed concern about the election.

After its accusations of government fraud and vote buying during Sunday's first round of the parliamentary elections, Egypt's largest opposition group, the Muslim Brotherhood, has decided not to take part in this weekend's runoff poll. The decision comes one day after the Higher Elections Committee announced the first round's official results in which the Islamist group failed to win a single seat, but still had 27 candidates to compete in the runoff. The ruling National Democratic Party won nearly 95% of the 221 seats settled in the first round. Most of the remaining undecided seats will be contested by NDP candidates against each other, guaranteeing President Hosni Mubarak's party an absolute majority.

| Party | Seats | +/– |
|---|---|---|
| National Democratic Party | 424 | +100 |
| New Wafd Party | 6 | 0 |
| National Progressive Unionist Rally Party | 5 | +3 |
| Democratic Generation Party | 1 | New |
| Democratic Peace Party | 1 | New |
| El-Ghad Party | 1 | –1 |
| Social Justice Party | 1 | New |
| Muslim Brotherhood independents | 1 | –87 |
| Independents | 65 | +57 |
| Presidential appointees | 10 | 0 |
| Vacant | 3 | – |
| Total | 518 | +64 |
Source: Ahram Online

== Aftermath ==
The failure to achieve the 5% threshold by the major opposition parties endangered their involvement in the presidential elections due in 2011. The amendment of article 76 of the Constitution, which allowed multi-candidate presidential elections, but imposed draconian rules on party nominees, is thought to be in need of alteration to remove the 5% restriction. Without such an alteration, the 2011 presidential elections will be little more than a modified version of the single-candidate poll it has been for the past 5 decades or so.

=== 2011 Egyptian protests ===
In 2011, following sentiment during the 2010–2011 Tunisian uprising, Egyptians also took to the streets to protest similar conditions such as police brutality, the state of emergency laws in place for decades, unemployment, a desire to raise the minimum wage, lack of housing, food inflation, corruption, lack of freedom of speech, and poor living conditions. There were also rumours that the President Mubarak's son had fled the country.

Just over a month after having been formed Mubarak asked for the government's resignation on 28 January 2011 saying he would call for a new government the next day.

After Mubarak's resignation following 18 days of on-going protests, Egypt's military council dissolved parliament, a key demand of the protesters.

== See also ==
- Democracy in the Middle East
- 2005 Egyptian parliamentary election
