= 2005 Egyptian presidential election =

- 7 September 2005
- Registered: 31,826,284
- Turnout: 22.95%
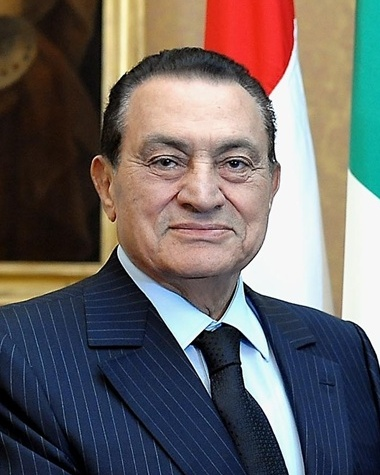

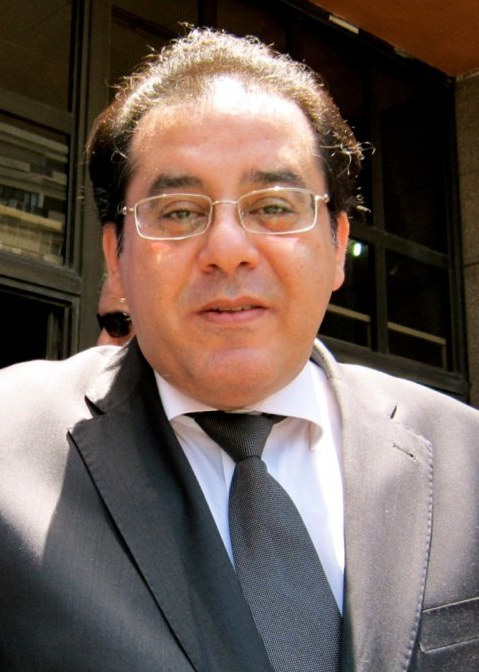
Candidate	Hosni Mubarak	Ayman Nour
Party	NDP	El-Ghad Party
Popular vote	6,316,714	540,405
Percentage	88.57%	7.58%
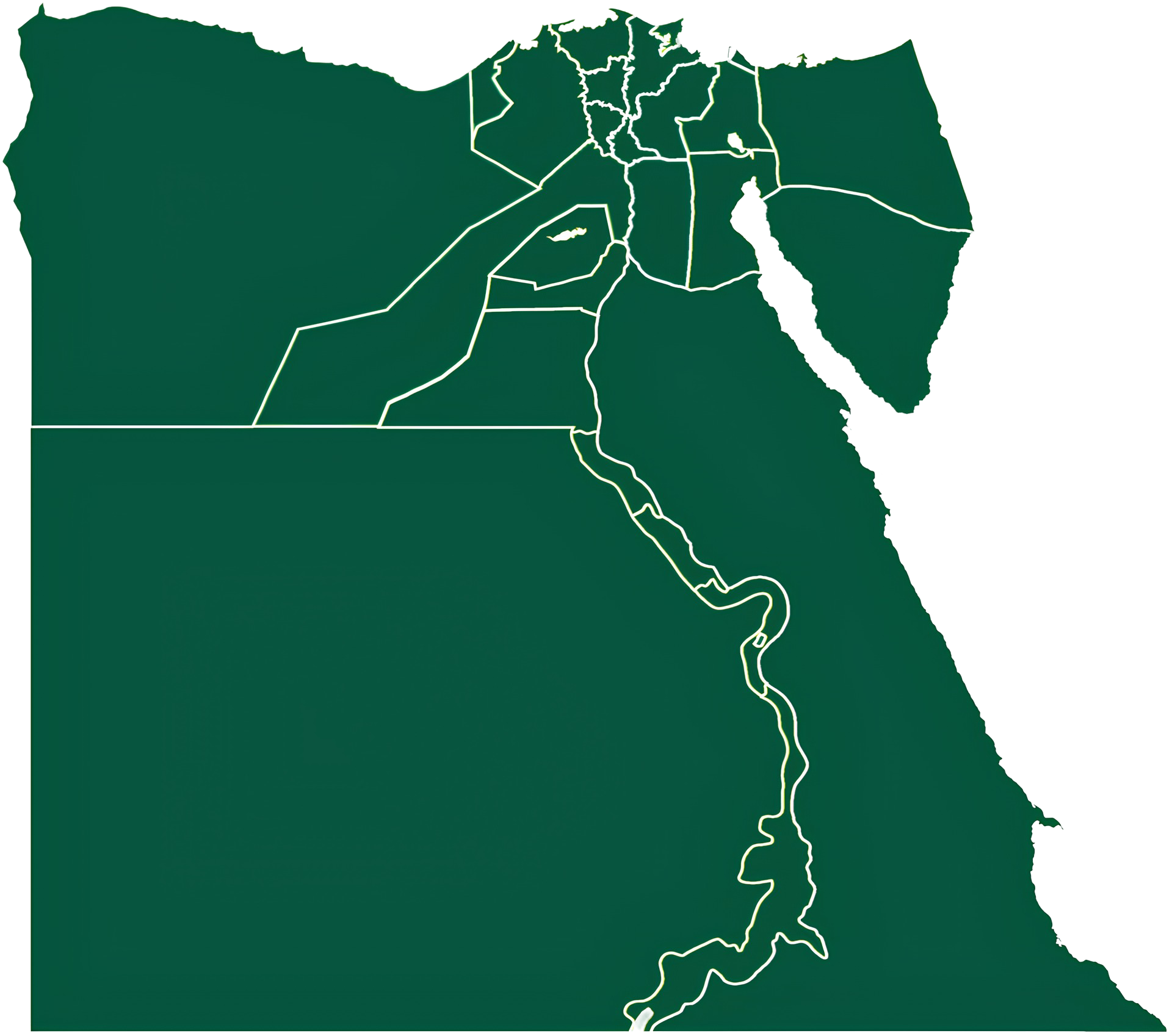
- Results by governorate Mubarak: >80%
President before election
Hosni Mubarak
NDP
Elected President
Hosni Mubarak
NDP

Presidential elections were held by the authoritarian Hosni Mubarak regime in Egypt on September 7, 2005, the first to feature more than one candidate. Incumbent president Hosni Mubarak was re-elected for a fifth consecutive six-year term in office, with official results showing he won 88.6% of the vote. The elections were marred by widespread reports of voter intimidation, payments to Mubarak voters, and pressure on poll workers to instruct voters to vote for Mubarak.

Most major opposition parties boycotted the elections due to concerns about the willingness of the authoritarian regime to conduct the elections fairly.

The opposition said the results were forged. Mubarak's main opponent, Ayman Nour, of the El-Ghad Party, is estimated to have received 7.3% of the vote and Numan Gumaa received 2.8%, however, Nour claimed that prior polling results showed over 30%. Criticism of the election process has centred on the process of selecting the eligible candidates, and on alleged election-law violations during voting.

Mubarak was sworn in for his new term on September 27.

== Candidates ==
The election was the first-ever multi-party election in the history of Hosni Mubarak's rule. Ten parties were set to take part; the leading candidates were:

- Hosni Mubarak of the National Democratic Party
- Numan Gumaa of the New Wafd Party
- Ayman Nour of the El-Ghad Party

Also contending were:

- Osama Shaltut of the Solidarity Party
- Ibrahim Turk of the Democratic Union Party
- Ahmad al-Sabahi of the Umma Party
- Rifaat al-Agrudi of the National Conciliation Party
- Fawzi Ghaza of the Egypt 2000 Party
- Mamduh Qinawi of the Constitutional Party
- Wahid al-Uqsuri of the Egypt Arab Socialist Party (disqualified on September 3)

== Change from referendum on Mubarak's rule ==
Before the 2005 election, Egyptians had only been able to approve or reject a candidate appointed by parliament, which was dominated by Hosni Mubarak's NDP. Mubarak had been re-elected four times during his 24-year rule by such a referendum. Mubarak won the 1999 referendum with almost 94% of the vote, though turnout was probably around 10%.

Under United States pressure, Egypt agreed to allow multi-party elections for the first time.

A constitutional amendment approved in a referendum in May 2005 opened the way for multi-candidate presidential elections.

== 2005 presidential election process ==
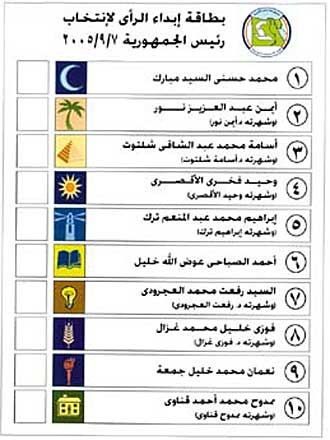
Ballot paper.

Under Egyptian election law, all Egyptians over age eighteen are required to vote. However, out of a population of approximately 77,500,000 (the largest in the Arab world), only about 32 million voters were registered (approximately 40% of the total population).

Under the election law, parties proposed candidates for the election, which were reviewed by the Presidential Election Commission. Of the 30 proposed candidates, only 10 were allowed to participate in the presidential election by the Presidential Election Commission. One prominent candidate not allowed to run was Talaat Sadat, the nephew of former President Anwar Sadat, who appealed his disqualification unsuccessfully.

Egypt's largest Islamic group, the Muslim Brotherhood, was not permitted to field a candidate for the election because the organization is banned by the government, which prohibits political parties with a stated religious agenda. The Brotherhood did not back any of the other candidates, but they encouraged Egyptians to go to the polls and vote for anyone other than Mubarak.

The election campaign kicked off on August 17, 2005, and lasted until September 4, 2005. While many believed Hosni Mubarak's re-election a foregone conclusion, he campaigned seriously, trying to win votes across Egypt.

9,865 polling places were open until 10:00 p.m. Wednesday, September 7, so that voters could cast their ballots. Full results were not expected until at least Thursday September 8.

The election was overseen by Egyptian judges. No international monitors were allowed to oversee the election.

According to a late August report by the Cairo Institute for Human Rights Studies, media coverage was biased in favour of Hosni Mubarak.

If no candidate had received 50% of the vote, the top two candidates would have contested a second election scheduled for September 17.

== Criticisms of the 2005 presidential election arrangements ==
Some of the main legal opposition parties, including the leftist Tagammu Party and the Nasserist Party, boycotted the election, saying it was unlikely to be free or fair. Those opposing the election said the electoral reforms had not gone far enough because the election regulations severely restricted independent candidates and overwhelmingly favoured the NDP.

Secondly, the Muslim Brotherhood, believed to be the most popular opposition group in Egypt, was excluded from running in the elections because Mubarak's government had made it officially illegal and barred from major political processes. Supporters of the Brotherhood and other opposition parties stated that this undermined the credibility of the election.

In addition, there appeared to be official harassment of the leading opposition candidate Nour, who was stripped of his parliamentary immunity and arrested in January 2005, on what many observers regarded as trumped-up charges. He was imprisoned for a short time that year before public and international outcry resulted in his release before trial.

The New Wafd Party and the Tomorrow (Ghad) Party contested the election even though they had opposed the May 2005 constitutional referendum, and their respective candidates, Numan Gumaa and Ayman Nour, drew significant support—Nour won 12% and Gumaa won 5–7%.

== Conduct ==
At 10:00 a.m. on September 7, two hours after the start of the election, Egypt's Presidential Election Commission unexpectedly stated that it would allow civil society groups to monitor the election. However, in many cases they were not allowed into polling places and were beaten and interrogated, especially in Southern Egypt.

These citizen monitors were in addition to the Egyptian judges who have been allowed to independently monitor the elections.

Allegations of election law violations surfaced during the voting. News media reported that Mubarak's National Democratic Party transported voters to the polls by bus, and allegedly did not allow voters to mark their choices behind a curtain, an essential requirement of a secret ballot. Polling stations in Cairo were plastered with Mubarak posters and members of the NDP hovered over voters, taking ballots from voters and handing them to polling station officials.

Ayman Nour of the El-Ghad Party, one of the most prominent opposition candidates, along with others, has accused the government of not using truly indelible ink on the hands of voters, allowing voters favoring Hosni Mubarak to remove stamps indicating they had voted and return to vote again. Indelible ink was used only in major boxes, while non-permanent ink was used in many other boxes. There were rumors of certain voters that had no ink at all which would make voter fraud even less difficult. Nour also alleged that there was widespread vote-buying, a charge supported by the Egyptian Organisation for Human Rights, though not otherwise corroborated.

The Egyptian Organisation for Human Rights, while supporting Nour's claims, has stated that the irregularities were insufficient to require a rerun of the election.

== Results ==
The Mubarak government initially stated that turnout was high, though numbers varied. Surprisingly, on September 9, the government released results and turnout figures that were low and may have been accurate, as low in some places as 19%. On September 8, however, an election official and Mubarak's campaign both stated that it was around 30%.

Both on election day and afterwards, election monitoring groups stated that turnout was low, reportedly because ordinary Egyptians thought the outcome a foregone conclusion. On September 8, anonymous sources stated turnout in Alexandria, the second-largest city in Egypt, was 17%, and turnout in Ismaïlia (a city of about 750,000) was about 24%, with Mubarak taking more than 80% of the vote.

Wael Namara, a spokesman for Ayman Nour of the El-Ghad Party, estimated turnout to be between 10 and 15% in the countryside and from 3 to 5% in the cities. In previous elections, voter turnout has run at less than 10 percent. Voter turnout in the May 2005 referendum that allowed the presidential election was officially reported as 54%, but judges monitoring the elections said it was more like 3%.

Media reports on September 8, based on anonymous statements from election commission officials, stated that preliminary results showed President Hosni Mubarak winning 78–80% of the vote and Ayman Nour winning 12%. Gumaa was reported as receiving 5-7%. Late reports from September 8 placed Mubarak's numbers at approximately 72%, based once again on anonymous sources.

The official result, that Mubarak won the election with 88.6% of the vote, was announced on September 9, 2005. Detailed results, with results and voting breakdowns by province for 15 of the 26 provinces (not including the largest provinces), were published in Al-Ahram, a state newspaper. The same source states that Nour won 6.2% in the 15 provinces, 20% in the Nile delta province of Buheira, and 16% in Alexandria.

Candidate	Party	Votes	%
Hosni Mubarak	National Democratic Party	6,316,784	88.57
Ayman Nour	El-Ghad Party	540,405	7.58
Numan Gumaa	New Wafd Party	208,891	2.93
Osama Shaltout	Solidarity Party	29,857	0.42
Wahid al-Uqsuri	Egyptian Arab Socialist Party	11,881	0.17
Ibrahim Turk	Democratic Union Party	5,831	0.08
Mamduh Qinawi	Free Social Constitutional Party	5,481	0.08
Ahmad al-Sabahi	Umma Party	4,393	0.06
Fawzi Ghazal	Egypt 2000 Party	4,222	0.06
Rifaat al-Agrudi	National Conciliation Party	4,106	0.06
Total		7,131,851	100.00
Valid votes		7,131,851	97.63
Invalid/blank votes		173,185	2.37
Total votes		7,305,036	100.00
Registered voters/turnout		31,826,284	22.95
Source: IFES

== Aftermath ==
=== Nour demands rerun ===
Following widespread reports of election law violations, Nour immediately demanded a rerun of the election. However, the Presidential Election Commission rejected his request as baseless on September 8, 2005, a decision that cannot be appealed. Nour's campaign manager, Wael Nawara, noted the Nour camp's surprise that the Presidential Election Commission would reject Nour's claims "despite the coverage from the media and the repetitive nature of these complaints."

=== International reactions ===
Saudi Foreign Minister Prince Saud al-Faisal stated that the elections show that Mubarak has democratic intentions and that elections can take place there without harming stability: "The poll that took place in Egypt refutes the case made by those who claim Egypt is unstable and question its march toward the future."

United States State Department spokesman Sean McCormack said that the United States saw this election as a "historic departure" and the debate during the election process would "enrich the Egyptian political dialogue, certainly for years to come." McCormack also stated that "the Egyptian security services showed discipline in ensuring safety and security" and praised the "relative calm" of Election Day. However, McCormack criticized the lack of international monitors and the late decision to allow monitors, as well as the lack of media access that prevented opposition candidates from getting their message out. As for election day itself, he stated that "there were reports of some irregularities at polling places in terms of campaign posters or t-shirts being seen at the actual polling place and a variety of other issues." The United States expressed its hope that "the Egyptian Government and the Egyptian people can build upon this positive first step in holding this multi-candidate presidential election and build on the positive experiences, the positive actions in this election, as they look towards parliamentary elections in the fall time and look to addressing some of those issues that I mentioned that were less positive."

=== Protests by Kefaya movement ===
On September 7, men in plainclothes broke up a Cairo protest by the Kefaya movement calling for Egyptians to boycott the elections, beating some of the protesters. Media sources state that as many as three thousand Kifaya protesters illegally marched on central Cairo, possibly the largest crowd ever drawn by that protest movement, while armed soldiers and police watched.

=== More protests ===
A larger protest of around 10,000 people was organized by Kifaya on September 10, 2005, to contest the election results and the mass rigging activities and cheating that occurred on the election day. It was reported by independent observers, reporters and candidate representatives that the NDP (Mubarak's Party) used government resources to change the election results. In some cases, citizens were beaten or forced to vote for Mubarak. In other cases, the boxes were already filled with marked ballots. However, the most explicit action that provoked the protest was allowing pro-Mubarak voters only to vote without being previously registered in the voter lists, giving Mubarak between 20 and 30 extra illegal points in the results.
