= Liberal Socialists Party =

Liberal Socialists Party Hizb al-Ahrar al-Ishtirakin حزب الأحرار الاشتراكيين
- Chairperson: Helmy Ahmed Salim
- Founded: 1976
- Dissolved: 2011
- Headquarters: Cairo
- Newspaper: Al Ahrar; Al Haquiqa; Al Nour
- Ideology: Conservatism; Economic liberalism Egyptian nationalism
- Political position: Right-wing (Note: Since 1976, there have been 3 political factions in Egypt: the Liberal Socialists Party (SPO) is right-wing, the Egypt Arab Socialist Party (ASU) is centre, and the National Progressive Unionist Rally Party (NUPO) is left-wing.)
- Religion: Sunni Islam
- National affiliation: Arab Socialist Union (1976–1978)
- Colours: Green black

The Liberal Socialists Party (Arabic: حزب الأحرار الاشتراكيين, Ḥizb al-ʾAḥrār al-Ištirākiyyīn) or Socialist Liberal Organization was a political party in Egypt. It was established as the right-wing faction of the governing Arab Socialist Union (ASU) and became an independent party after ASU's dissolution.

== History and profile ==
The party was established in 1976. Its leader was Mustafa Kamel Murad. He led the party until his death in 1998.

In the 2000 parliamentary elections, the party won 1 out of 444 seats in the Majlis al-Sha'ab. However, at the following elections in 2005, it failed to win any seats. It was part of the National Democratic Alliance for Egypt during the 2011-2012 parliamentary elections.

There were official media outlets of the Liberal Socialist Party, including Al Ahrar and Al Nour.

== Platform ==
- Sharia is a main source of legislation.
- Freedom of expression and thought.
- Election the President and Vice-President through free elections.
- Enhancing role of the private sector.
- Ensuring basic rights of labourers and peasants.
- Freedom of the press.
- Independence of the judiciary.
- Development of education.

== Electoral history ==
=== People's Assembly of Egypt elections ===
Election	Votes	%	Seats	+/–	Position
1976	as part of ASU		15 / 360	▲15	▲2nd
1979			2 / 392	▼13	▼3rd
1984	33,448	0.7%	0 / 458	▼2	▼5th
1987	1,163,525	17% as part of the Islamic alliance	60 / 458	▲60	▲2nd
1990	Boycotted		0 / 454	▼60	
1995			1 / 454	▲1	▲6th
2000			1 / 454	Steady	▲5th
2005			0 / 518	▼1	

== See also ==
- Liberalism in Egypt
