= El-Sayyid el-Badawi =

Egyptian businessman and politician

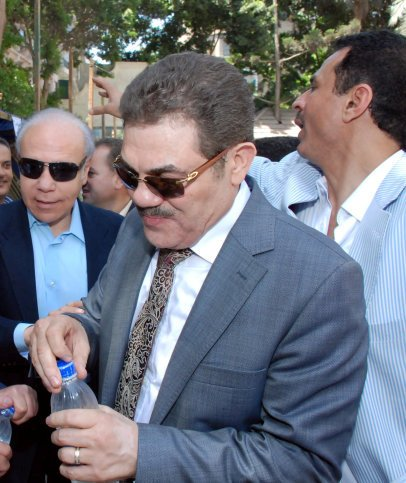

Chairperson of the New Wafd Party
- Incumbent
- Assumed office 30 January 2026
- Preceded by: Abdel-Sanad Yamama

Chairperson of the New Wafd Party
- In office 28 May 2010 – 30 March 2018
- Preceded by: Mahmoud Abaza
- Succeeded by: Bahaa El-Din Abu Shoka

Personal details
- Born: El-Sayyid el-Badawi Shehata; 1950 (age 75–76) Tanta, Egypt
- Party: Al-Wafd Party

El-Sayyid el-Badawi Shehata (Egyptian Arabic: السيد البدوى شحاتة, IPA: [esˈsæjjed elˈbædæwi ʃeˈħæːtæ]; born 1950) is an Egyptian businessman who has served as president of Al-Wafd Party since January 2026; he previously served in the position from 2010 until 2018. He is the head of the Board of Directors of Al-Hayah Egyptian television network.

== Early life ==
Badawi was born in 1950 and grew up in Tanta governorate. He graduated from the Faculty of Pharmacy of the University of Alexandria in 1973.

== Career ==
Badawi started his political career in the 1980s and joined Wafd Party in 1980 where he was elected as secretary general of the party in 2000.

Badawi was elected party president in May 2010. He was re-elected as president of the party in 2014 and was succeeded in 2018 by Bahaa El-Din Abu Shoka, after serving the maximum two terms.

He is one of the candidates running in the 2026 party leadership election, which will take place on 30 January. El-Badawi won the election, defeating his closest rival, Hani Serrieddin.
