= Fouad Serageddin =

Egyptian politician (1910–2000)

- فؤاد سراج الدين باش
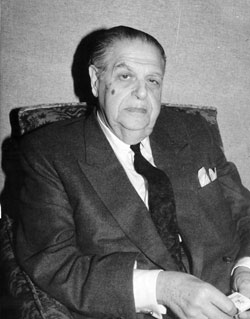

Minister of the Interior
- In office 12 January 1950 – 27 January 1952
- Monarch: King Farouk
- Prime Minister: Mostafa El-Nahas
- Preceded by: Hussein Sirri Pasha
- Succeeded by: Ahmed Mortada Al-Maraghi
- In office 2 June 1943 – 8 October 1944
- Monarch: King Farouk
- Prime Minister: Mostafa El-Nahas
- Preceded by: Mostafa El-Nahas
- Succeeded by: Ahmad Maher Pasha

Minister of Finance
- In office 11 November 1950 – 27 January 1952
- Monarch: King Farouk
- Prime Minister: Mostafa El-Nahas
- Preceded by: Mohamed Zaki Abdel-Motaal
- Succeeded by: Mohamed Zaki Abdel-Motaal

Minister of Transport
- In office 25 July 1949 – 3 November 1949
- Monarch: King Farouk
- Prime Minister: Hussein Sirri Pasha
- Preceded by: Riyadh Abdul Aziz Saif Al-Nasr Bek
- Succeeded by: Mohammed Ali Namazi

Minister of Social Affairs
- In office 2 June 1943 – 8 October 1944
- Monarch: King Farouk
- Prime Minister: Mostafa El-Nahas
- Preceded by: Abdul Hamid Abdul Haq
- Succeeded by: Mohammed Hussein Heikal

Minister of Agriculture
- In office 26 May 1942 – 2 June 1943
- Monarch: King Farouk
- Prime Minister: Mostafa El-Nahas
- Preceded by: Abd al-Salam Fahmi Muhammad Juma Pasha
- Succeeded by: Ahmed Abdel Ghaffar Pasha

Personal details
- Born: 2 November 1910
- Died: 9 August 2000 (aged 89)
- Party: Wafd Party
- Other political affiliations: New Wafd Party

Fouad Serageddin Pasha (Note: Due to the lack of standardization of transcribing written and regionally pronounced Arabic, his name has been romanized in various ways, including: Fuad Siraj al-Din, Fuad Sirag al-Din, Fu'ad Sirag al-Din, Fuad Serag ad-Din, Fu'ad Siraj al-Din, Fuad Serag al-Din, Fuad Serag Eddin, and Fuad Serageddine.) (2 November 1910 – 9 August 2000) was an Egyptian liberal politician and leader of the Egyptian Wafd Party, as well as Secretary of the original Wafd Party from June 1948 until the parties dissolution in January 1953.

== Early life and career ==
Serageddin was born in the village Kafr al-Garayda in Gharbiyya on 2 November 1910 (Note: Goldschmidt Jr puts his birth date as 2 November 1910, but suggests it could be as early as 1906. 1906 was the year of birth Serageddin himself stated when he ran in 1936, due to the requirement that deputies to parliament must be at least thirty years old. In 1946, his political rivals tried to prove that he was born in 1910 when he ran for senate, due to the age requirement of Egyptian senators being forty, but were not successful. Later on, Serageddin put his year of birth as 1910.) to a family of landowners. His father studied in the French school in Tanta and was a member of parliament in 1924, 1925, and 1931. He graduated from Wassiya primary school in 1922 and the Sa'diya secondary school in 1926. Later, he attended law school in Cairo University. He graduated in 1931 and went to work in the Niyaba, leaving briefly following the death of his father in 1934 to manage the family estates. During his post-graduate career, he was briefly an apprentice to Hassan Allam. He first ran in the 1936 parliamentary elections representing his hometown district as a Wafd candidate with the help of leading Wafdist Makram Ebeid. He became a financial advisor to the wife of the leader of the party, Mustafa al-Nahhas, and received his first ministerial position following the Wafdist victory in the 1942 elections. (Note: Both Reid (1980) and Quraishi (1967) state that he became Minister of Agriculture on 31 March 1942, but Younan Labib Rizk's "The History of the Egyptian Ministries 1878-1953", which contains the exact details of the cabinets of this time, puts it on 26 May 1942.) Following Ebeid's falling out with al-Nahhas, Ebeid would accuse Serageddin of corruption, a charge he denied. He would also serve as interior minister in Nahhas' government. He sponsored a law giving Egyptian trade unions legal recognition for the first time and was elected honorary president of Wafd friendly unions in Cairo and Alexandria. In September 1944, King Farouk was infuriated to see banners with his name and al-Nahhas and ordered them removed, which the director of public security complied without consulting Serageddin, who fired him. Shortly afterwards, al-Nahhas' government was dismissed. Out of power, he managed his estates, successfully ran for senate in 1946 and served on the board of directors of the Egyptian Coca Cola Company. He helped organize Wafdist protesters during the 1946 Egyptian protests. He later became secretary of the Wafd party in June 1948. He served as minister of communication in Hussein Sirri Pasha's government in 1949.

== Late Wafd career ==
In 1950, the Wafd won its last election. The Wafd was traditionally a liberal nationalist party, but a leftist wing known as the 'Wafdist Vanguard' emerged during its later years. The idea of socialism was growing in popularity in this time. Serageddin represented a conservative counter to the rise of leftists in the party. While he announced that all of the Wafdists deputies were "socialists", he also privately told the US ambassador in late 1951 "I own 8000 feddans. Do you think I want Egypt to go communist?". In this government, he served as the minister of the interior, finance as well as acting minister of education. Following the abrogation of the 1936 Anglo-Egyptian treaty in 1951, student demonstrations and militant attacks against British forces on the Suez Canal grew in strength. Privately, he tried to quiet the guerrillas to maintain order and continue negotiations with the United Kingdom. As minister of the interior, he unsuccessfully tried to ban student demonstrations. On 25 January 1952, he ordered the Egyptian police at Ismailia to resist British forces. The resulting battle of Ismailia infuriated the Egyptian masses, leading to a riots in Cairo known as the Cairo fire. The Wafd government was dismissed the next day.

== Trial ==
Serageddin was placed under house arrest in mid-March 1952 under the government of Ahmed Naguib el-Hilaly, later released on a court order under the government of Hussein Sirri Pasha in July. During the 1952 Egyptian revolution, Serageddin was on holiday in France. He was arrested but released in December 1952 then arrested again on 20 January 1953 and released a month later. (Note: Gordon (1992) puts this date as 19 January and the date of his release on early August for health reasons.) In the early negotiations between the Free Officers and the Wafd, Serageddin suggested a progressive tax system on land instead of more radical land reform - a proposal which did not satisfy the revolutionary officers. On 16 September 1952, he resigned from the party amid calls from the officers for 'party purification', before all political parties were banned in 1953. (Note: Terry (1982) puts this date as 12 September.) An official trial against him, with Abdel Baghdadi, Anwar Sadat and Hasan Ibrahim as judges, started on 8 December 1953 following his arrest on 21 September. The charges were manipulating the cotton market, allowing the king to transfer funds abroad illegally, conspiring to block the legal case regarding arms racketeering in the 1948 Palestine war, accepting a £E 5000 bribe, insufficiently planning the abrogation of the treaty with Britain and negligence during the Cairo riots. The trial lasted eight weeks; testifying against him were Naguib el-Hilaly, Husayn Sirri, 'Ali Mahir, Muhammad Husayn Haykal, and Makram Ebeid. In the trial, he defended himself by taking credit for opening the arms racketeering legal case – though in fact he tried to obstruct the case – and denied accusations of corruption. He was sentenced to fifteen years but released under house arrest in late 1955 or early 1956, briefly rearrested in 1961 and 1967. His cousins were in contact with the US embassy during this period. In 1975 some of his land was restored to him and his family.

== Return to politics ==
In 1976, President Anwar Sadat decided to move away from the one-party system that had dominated Egypt since the abolition of the multi-party system in 1953. The laws for the formation of new parties stated that they must be approved by the Central Committee – an old body of the Arab Socialist Union – at least twenty deputies in the People's Assembly, half its founders being farmers and workers, and must not have existed during the time of the monarchy, among other rules. In the spring of 1977, Serageddin planned his return to politics. On 23 August 1977 – the fiftieth anniversary of the death of Wafd party founder Saad Zaghloul and the twelfth anniversary of the death of his successor Mostafa el-Nahas – he delivered an hours-long speech at the bar association, lasting from nine in the evening to one in the morning the next day. In this speech, he attacked the 1952 revolution while defending the 1919 revolution, which was led by the Wafd party and brought them to power, and defending the Wafd's record in office. The official program of the Neo-Wafd party was published in November 1977. However, this new party, like all other parties in Egyptian politics until the 2011 Egyptian revolution, was never able to genuinely challenge the system. The Neo-Wafd party never earned enough seats in parliament to govern. He was arrested in the September arrests of 1981, but shortly released under President Hosni Mubarak. Serageddin proved a skillful political operator given the limits imposed on a divided and decimated opposition, and made the Al-Wafd newspaper an instant success through its Asfoura (Sparrow) column exposés of corruption and mismanagement.

== Works ==
- Serageddin, Fouad (1977). لماذا الحزب الجديد [Why the New Party?] (in Arabic). Dar Shorouq.
