= 1990 Egyptian parliamentary election =

- 29 November 1990 (first round); 6 December 1990 (second round)

All 454 seats in the People's Assembly 228 seats needed for a majority

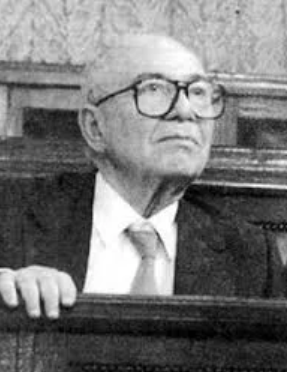
	First party	Second party
Leader	Atef Sedki	Khaled Mohieddin
Party	NDP	Tagammu
Seats won	348	6
Prime Minister before election
Atef Sedki
NDP
Subsequent Prime Minister
Atef Sedki
NDP

Early parliamentary elections were held in Egypt on 29 November 1990, with a second round for 261 seats on 6 December. They followed a referendum in October on the early dissolution of Parliament due to issues surrounding the legality of the 1987 elections. However, the elections were boycotted by the Socialist Labour Party (SLP), the Liberal Socialists Party (LSP), the Muslim Brotherhood and the New Wafd Party, which claimed that the reformed Electoral Law would fail to ensure free elections.

The result was a victory for the ruling National Democratic Party (NDP), which won 348 of the 444 elected seats. However, a further 56 of the 83 independent candidates were affiliated with the NDP, whilst 14 were affiliated with the New Wafd Party, 8 with the SLP and one with the LSP. Voter turnout was reported to be 44.2%, but was estimated to be only 20-30%.

== Results ==
Party	Votes	%	Seats	+/–
National Democratic Party			348	–11
National Progressive Unionist Rally Party			6	+6
Egyptian Green Party			0	New
Umma Party			0	0
Independents			83	+75
Presidential appointees			10	0
Vacant			7	–
Total			454	–4
Valid votes	6,902,982	95.17		
Invalid/blank votes	350,186	4.83		
Total votes	7,253,168	100.00		
Registered voters/turnout	16,326,229	44.43		
Source: IPU, Nohlen et al.
