= 1995 Egyptian parliamentary election =

- 29 November 1995 (first round); 6 December 1995 (second round)

All 454 seats in the People's Assembly 228 seats needed for a majority
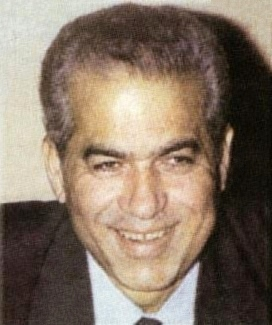

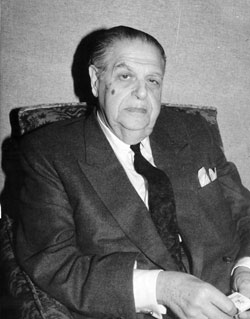
	First party	Second party
Leader	Kamal Ganzouri	Fouad Serageddin
Party	NDP	New Wafd
Seats won	318	6
Prime Minister before election
Atef Sedki
NDP
Subsequent Prime Minister
Kamal Ganzouri
NDP

Parliamentary elections were held in Egypt on 29 November 1995, with a second round for 168 seats on 6 December. The result was a victory for the ruling National Democratic Party (NDP), which won 318 seats. Following the election, 99 of the 112 independents also joined the NDP. Voter turnout was reported to be 47.99%.

In the lead-up to the election, the Hosni Mubarak regime arrested over 1,000 Muslim Brotherhood activists. 25 people were killed during the election campaign.

The elections were characterized by widespread irregularities. International election monitors were not allowed to monitor the elections.

== Results ==
Party	Votes	%	Seats	+/–
National Democratic Party			318	–30
New Wafd Party			6	New
National Progressive Unionist Rally Party			5	–1
Arab Democratic Nasserist Party			1	New
Socialist Labour Party			1	New
Liberal Socialists Party			1	New
Independents			112	+29
Presidential appointees			10	0
Total			454	0
Valid votes	9,812,942	97.43		
Invalid/blank votes	259,075	2.57		
Total votes	10,072,017	100.00		
Registered voters/turnout	20,987,453	47.99		
Source: IPU
