= 2000 Egyptian parliamentary election =

- 18 October–8 November 2000

All 454 seats in the People's Assembly 227 seats needed for a majority
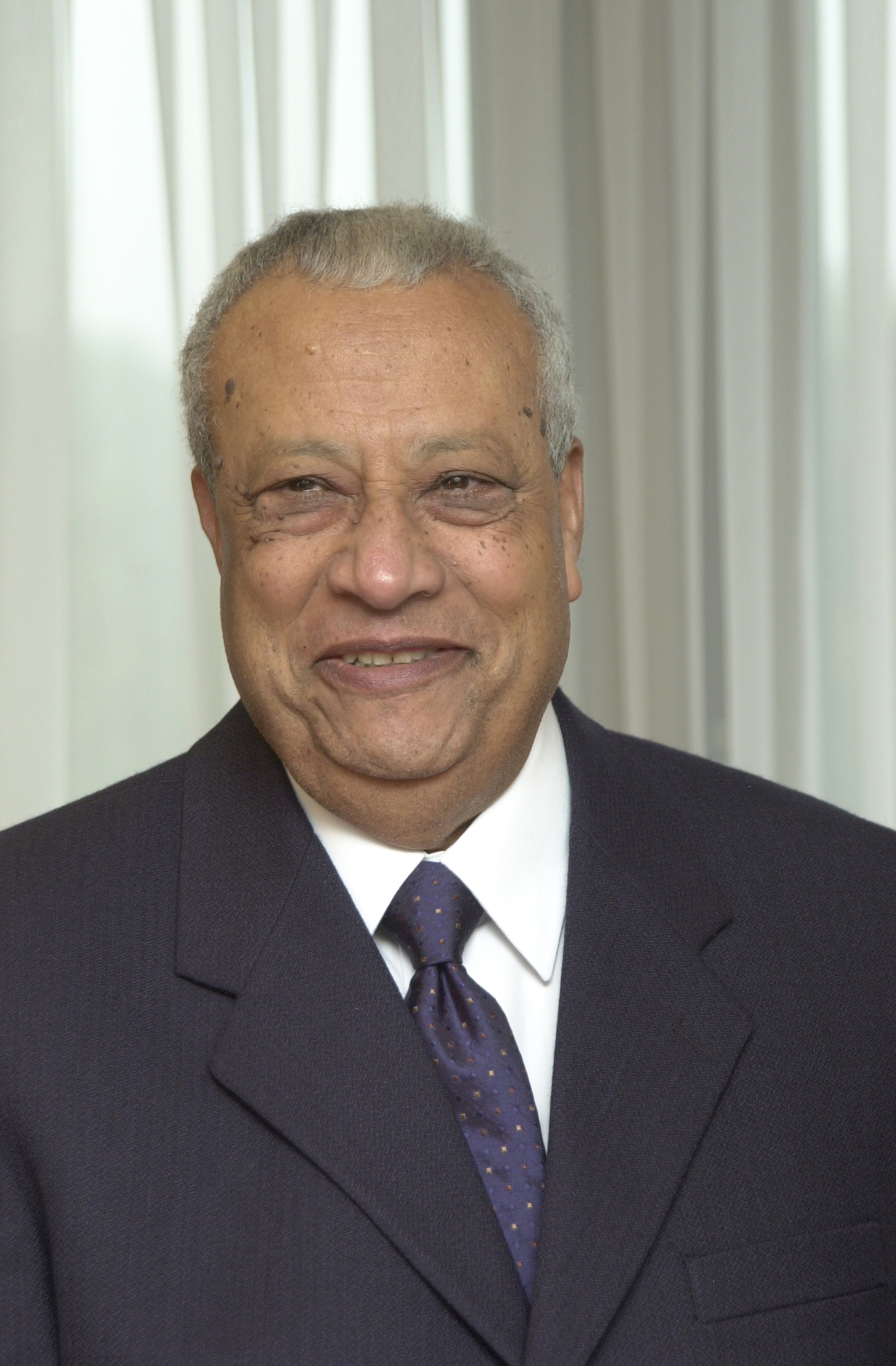

	First party	Second party
Leader	Atef Ebeid	Numan Gumaa
Party	NDP	New Wafd
Seats won	353	7
Prime Minister before election
Kamal Ganzouri
NDP
Subsequent Prime Minister
Atef Ebeid
NDP

Parliamentary elections were held in Egypt in three stages between 18 October and 8 November 2000. The result was a victory for the ruling National Democratic Party (NDP), which won 353 of the 454 seats, with 35 of the 72 independents elected joining the NDP after the elections. The banned Muslim Brotherhood came in a distant second, with 17 of its candidates elected running as independents. The remaining opposition parties won 16 seats.

The election was broken into stages after a July ruling by the Supreme Constitutional Court that judges must monitor all polling stations. The first stage on 18 October was held in 150 seats in northern Egypt, the second stage took place on 28 October for 134 seats in eastern and southern Egypt, and the third stage on 8 November involved the 156 seats in central Egypt, including Cairo. Two seats in Alexandria were left vacant after the results were annulled by a court.

== Results ==
Seventeen of the 72 independents were members of the Muslim Brotherhood.

Party	Seats	+/–
National Democratic Party	353	35
New Wafd Party	7	+1
National Progressive Unionist Rally Party	6	+1
Arab Democratic Nasserist Party	3	+2
Liberal Socialists Party	1	0
Independents	72	–40
Presidential appointees	10	0
Vacant	2	–
Total	454	0
Source: IPU, Zargar
