= List of prime ministers of Egypt =

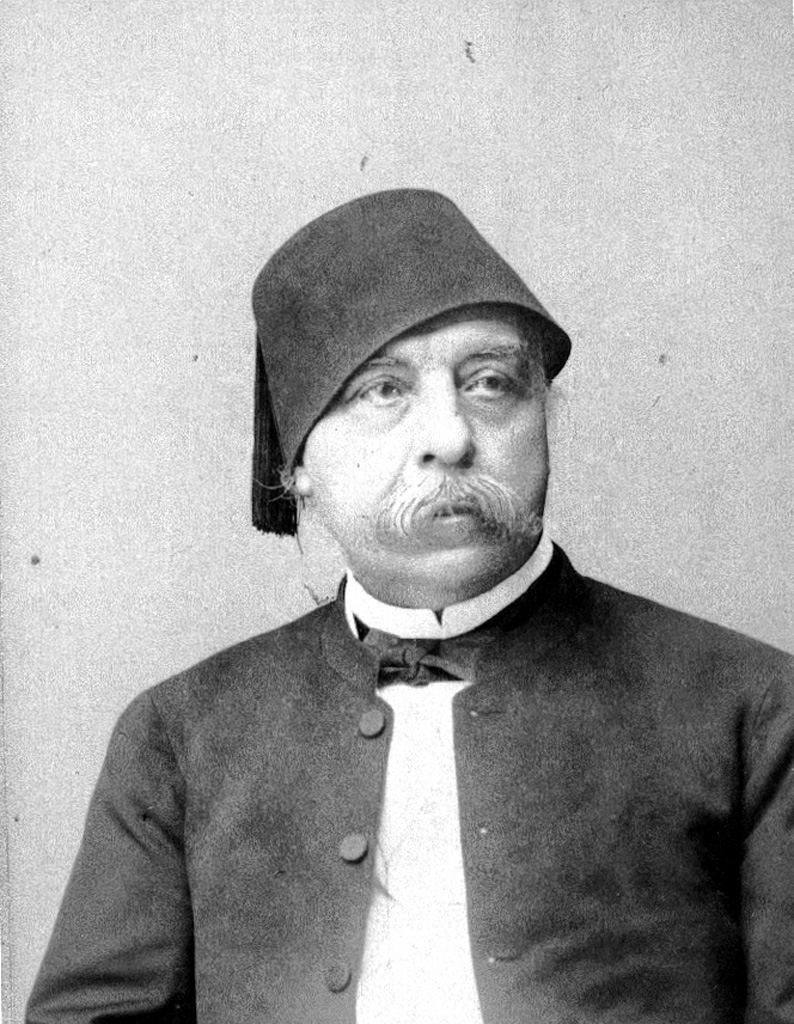
Nubar Pasha was the first and longest serving prime minister of the Khedivate of Egypt.

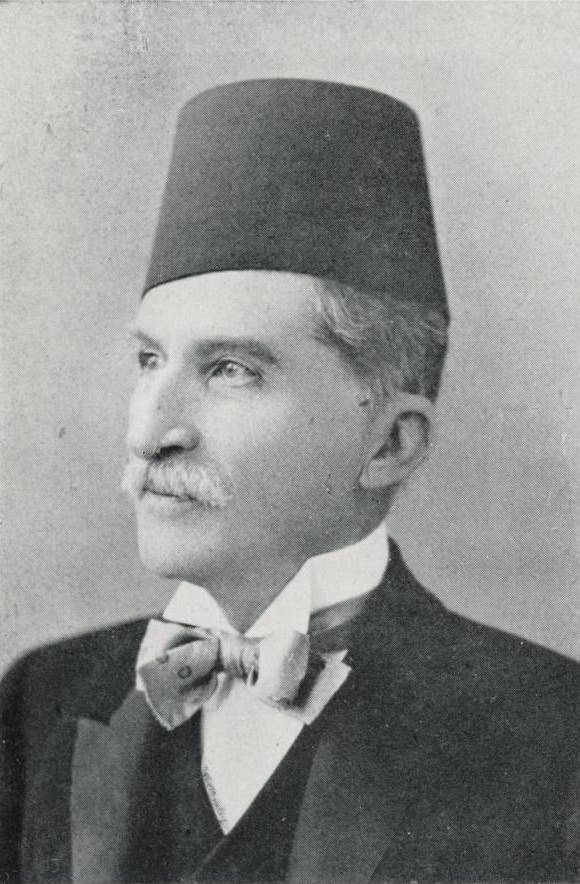
Mustafa Fahmi is the longest serving prime minister in one cabinet.

Atef Sedky is the longest serving prime minister of the Egyptian republic.

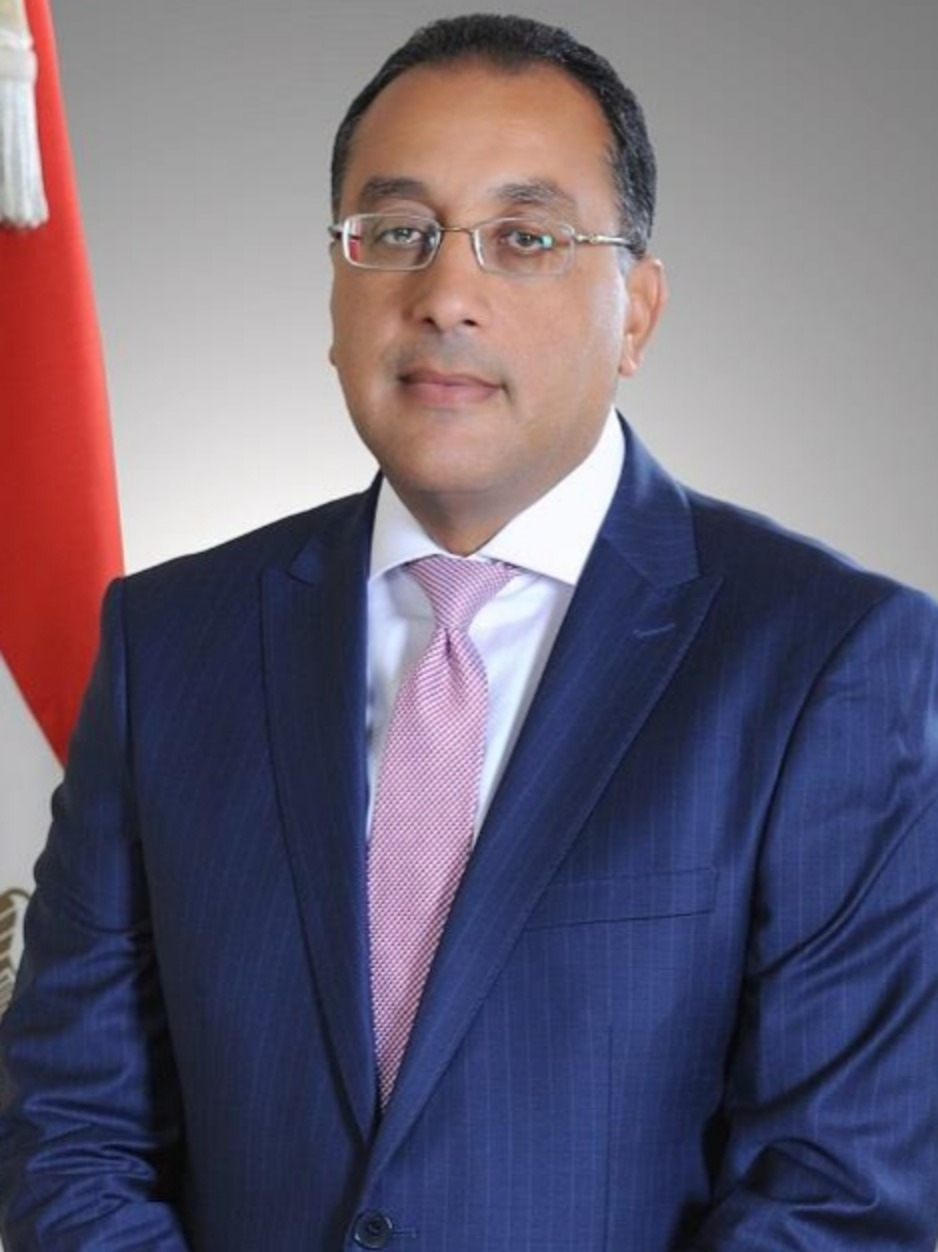
Mostafa Madbouly is the current prime minister.

The office of Prime Minister of Egypt was established in 1878, together with the Cabinet of Egypt, after Khedive Isma'il Pasha agreed to turn his powers over to a cabinet of ministers. Nubar Pasha was thus the first Prime Minister of Egypt in the modern sense.

Egypt has a long history with a prime minister-type position existing in its governance. During the Old, Middle, and New Kingdom phases of Ancient Egypt, it was common practice for the Pharaoh to appoint a second in command officer whose position is translated to as Vizier. Under various Islamic empires, Egypt had Viziers, a political office similar in authority and structure (in terms of being second in command to the head of state) to that of a prime minister. This pattern of having a prime minister/vizier position in government was only broken for an extended period of time during Roman and Sasanian governance of Egypt, in which Egypt was directly ruled by appointed Governors.

In Egyptian Arabic, the official term for Prime Minister more directly translates to 'President of the Ministers'. This is not to be confused with President of Egypt, which is a separate post.

The current Prime Minister of Egypt is Mostafa Madbouly, took office since 7 June 2018.

== List of officeholders ==
No.	Portrait	Name (Birth–Death)	Term of office			Political party	Elected	Cabinet(s)	Head of state (Reign/Term)	Ref.
No.	Portrait	Name (Birth–Death)	Took office	Left office	Time in office	Political party	Elected	Cabinet(s)	Head of state (Reign/Term)	Ref.
• Khedivate of Egypt (1878–1914) •
1		Nubar Pasha نوبار باشا (1824–1899)	28 August 1878	23 February 1879	179 days	Independent	—	N. Pasha I	Isma'il Pasha (1863–1879)	
—		Khedive Isma'il Pasha إسماعيل باشا (1830–1895)	23 February 1879	10 March 1879	15 days	Independent	—	N. Pasha I	Isma'il Pasha (1863–1879)	
2		Tewfik Pasha محمد توفيق باشا (1852–1892)	10 March 1879	7 April 1879	28 days	Independent	—	T. Pasha I	Isma'il Pasha (1863–1879)	
3		Mohamed Sherif Pasha محمد شريف باشا (1826–1887)	7 April 1879	18 August 1879	133 days	Independent	—	M. S. Pasha I	Isma'il Pasha (1863–1879)	
3		Mohamed Sherif Pasha محمد شريف باشا (1826–1887)	7 April 1879	18 August 1879	133 days	Independent	—	M. S. Pasha II	Isma'il Pasha (1863–1879)	
—		Khedive Tewfik Pasha محمد توفيق باشا (1852–1892)	18 August 1879	21 September 1879	34 days	Independent	—	T. Pasha II	Tewfik Pasha (1879–1892)	
4		Riyad Pasha رياض باشا (1836–1911)	21 September 1879	10 September 1881	1 year, 354 days	Independent	—	R. Pasha I	Tewfik Pasha (1879–1892)	
(3)		Mohamed Sherif Pasha محمد شريف باشا (1826–1887)	14 September 1881	4 February 1882	143 days	Independent	—	M. S. Pasha III	Tewfik Pasha (1879–1892)	
5		Mahmoud Sami Elbaroudi محمود سامي البارودي (1838–1904)	4 February 1882	26 May 1882	111 days	Independent	—	Elbaroudi	Tewfik Pasha (1879–1892)	
6		Isma'il Raghib Pasha إسماعيل راغب باشا (1819–1884)	18 June 1882	21 August 1882	64 days	Independent	—	I. R. Pasha	Tewfik Pasha (1879–1892)	
—		Ahmed Urabi أحمد عرابي (1841–1911); In rebellion	1 July 1882	13 September 1882 (deposed)	74 days	Military	—		Tewfik Pasha (1879–1892)	
(3)		Mohamed Sherif Pasha محمد شريف باشا (1826–1887)	21 August 1882	7 January 1884	1 year, 139 days	Independent	—	M. S. Pasha IV	Tewfik Pasha (1879–1892)	
(1)		Nubar Pasha نوبار باشا (1824–1899)	10 January 1884	9 June 1888	4 years, 151 days	Independent	1883	N. Pasha II	Tewfik Pasha (1879–1892)	
(4)		Riyad Pasha رياض باشا (1836–1911)	9 June 1888	12 May 1891	2 years, 337 days	Independent	—	R. Pasha II	Tewfik Pasha (1879–1892)	
(4)		Riyad Pasha رياض باشا (1836–1911)	9 June 1888	12 May 1891	2 years, 337 days	Independent	1889	R. Pasha II	Tewfik Pasha (1879–1892)	
7		Mustafa Fahmi Pasha مصطفى فهمي باشا (1840–1914)	12 May 1891	15 January 1893	1 year, 248 days	Independent	—		Tewfik Pasha (1879–1892)	
8		Hussein Fakhry Pasha حسين فخري باشا (1843–1910)	15 January 1893	17 January 1893	2 days	Independent	—		Abbas Helmi II (1892–1914)	
(4)		Riyad Pasha رياض باشا (1836–1911)	17 January 1893	16 April 1894	1 year, 89 days	Independent	—		Abbas Helmi II (1892–1914)	
(1)		Nubar Pasha نوبار باشا (1824–1899)	16 April 1894	12 November 1895	1 year, 210 days	Independent	—		Abbas Helmi II (1892–1914)	
(7)		Mustafa Fahmi Pasha مصطفى فهمي باشا (1840–1914)	12 November 1895	12 November 1908	13 years	Independent	1895		Abbas Helmi II (1892–1914)	
(7)		Mustafa Fahmi Pasha مصطفى فهمي باشا (1840–1914)	12 November 1895	12 November 1908	13 years	Independent	1901		Abbas Helmi II (1892–1914)	
9		Boutros Ghali بطرس غالي (1846–1910)	12 November 1908	21 February 1910 X	1 year, 101 days	Independent	—		Abbas Helmi II (1892–1914)	
10		Mohamed Said Pasha محمد سعيد باشا (1863–1928)	22 February 1910	5 April 1914	4 years, 42 days	Independent	—		Abbas Helmi II (1892–1914)	
11		Hussein Roshdy Pasha حسين رشدي باشا (1863–1928)	5 April 1914	19 December 1914	258 days	Independent	1913		Abbas Helmi II (1892–1914)	
• Sultanate of Egypt (1914–1922) •
(11)		Hussein Roshdy Pasha حسين رشدي باشا (1863–1928)	19 December 1914	12 April 1919	4 years, 114 days	Independent	—		Hussein Kamel (1914–1917)	
(10)		Mohamed Said Pasha محمد سعيد باشا (1863–1928)	21 May 1919	19 November 1919	182 days	Independent	—		Fuad I (1917–1936)	
12		Youssef Wahba Pasha يوسف باشا وهبة (1852–1934)	19 November 1919	20 May 1920	183 days	Independent	—		Fuad I (1917–1936)	
13		Mohamed Tawfik Naseem Pasha محمد توفيق نسيم باشا (1874–1938)	20 May 1920	16 March 1921	300 days	Independent	—		Fuad I (1917–1936)	
14		Adly Yakan Pasha عدلي يكن باشا (1864–1933)	16 March 1921	1 March 1922	350 days	Independent	—		Fuad I (1917–1936)	
• Kingdom of Egypt (1922–1953) •
15		Abdel Khalek Sarwat Pasha عبد الخالق ثروت باشا (1873–1928)	1 March 1922	30 November 1922	274 days	Independent	—		Fuad I (1917–1936)	
(13)		Mohamed Tawfik Naseem Pasha محمد توفيق نسيم باشا (1874–1938)	30 November 1922	15 March 1923	105 days	Independent	—		Fuad I (1917–1936)	
16		Yahya Ibrahim Pasha يحى إبراهيم (1861–1936)	15 March 1923	26 January 1924	317 days	Independent	—		Fuad I (1917–1936)	
17		Saad Zaghloul Pasha سعد زغلول (1857–1927)	26 January 1924	24 November 1924	303 days	Wafd Party	1923–1924		Fuad I (1917–1936)	
18		Ahmed Zeiwar Pasha أحمد زيوار باشا (1864–1945)	24 November 1924	7 June 1926	1 year, 195 days	Ittihad Party	—		Fuad I (1917–1936)	
18		Ahmed Zeiwar Pasha أحمد زيوار باشا (1864–1945)	24 November 1924	7 June 1926	1 year, 195 days	Ittihad Party	1925		Fuad I (1917–1936)	
(14)		Adly Yakan Pasha عدلي يكن باشا (1864–1933)	7 June 1926	26 April 1927	323 days	Liberal Constitutional Party	1926		Fuad I (1917–1936)	
(15)		Abdel Khalek Sarwat Pasha عبد الخالق ثروت باشا (1873–1928)	26 April 1927	16 March 1928	325 days	Liberal Constitutional Party	—		Fuad I (1917–1936)	
19		Mostafa el-Nahas Pasha مصطفى النحاس باشا (1879–1965)	16 March 1928	27 June 1928	103 days	Wafd Party	—		Fuad I (1917–1936)	
20		Mohamed Mahmoud Pasha محمد محمود باشا (1877–1941)	27 June 1928	4 October 1929	1 year, 99 days	Liberal Constitutional Party	—		Fuad I (1917–1936)	
(14)		Adly Yakan Pasha عدلي يكن باشا (1864–1933)	4 October 1929	1 January 1930	89 days	Independent	1929		Fuad I (1917–1936)	
(19)		Mostafa el-Nahas Pasha مصطفى النحاس باشا (1879–1965)	1 January 1930	20 June 1930	170 days	Wafd Party	—		Fuad I (1917–1936)	
21		Ismail Sidky Pasha إسماعيل صدقي (1875–1950)	20 June 1930	22 September 1933	3 years, 94 days	People's Party	—		Fuad I (1917–1936)	
21		Ismail Sidky Pasha إسماعيل صدقي (1875–1950)	20 June 1930	22 September 1933	3 years, 94 days	People's Party	1931		Fuad I (1917–1936)	
22		Abdel Fattah Yahya Pasha يحيى إبراهيم باشا (1876–1951)	22 September 1933	15 November 1934	1 year, 54 days	Independent	—		Fuad I (1917–1936)	
(13)		Mohamed Tawfik Naseem Pasha محمد توفيق نسيم باشا (1874–1938)	15 November 1934	30 January 1936	1 year, 76 days	Independent	—		Fuad I (1917–1936)	
23		Aly Maher Pasha علي ماهر باشا (1882–1960)	30 January 1936	9 May 1936	100 days	Independent	—		Fuad I (1917–1936)	
(19)		Mostafa el-Nahas Pasha مصطفى النحاس باشا (1879–1965)	9 May 1936	29 December 1937	1 year, 234 days	Wafd Party	1936		Farouk I (1936–1952)	
(20)		Mohamed Mahmoud Pasha محمد محمود باشا (1877–1941)	29 December 1937	18 August 1939	1 year, 232 days	Liberal Constitutional Party	—		Farouk I (1936–1952)	
(20)		Mohamed Mahmoud Pasha محمد محمود باشا (1877–1941)	29 December 1937	18 August 1939	1 year, 232 days	Liberal Constitutional Party	1938		Farouk I (1936–1952)	
(23)		Aly Maher Pasha علي ماهر باشا (1882–1960)	18 August 1939	28 June 1940	315 days	Independent	—		Farouk I (1936–1952)	
24		Hassan Sabry Pasha حسن صبرى باشا (1879–1940)	28 June 1940	15 November 1940 #	140 days	Independent	—		Farouk I (1936–1952)	
25		Hussein Sirri Pasha حسين سري باشا (1894–1960)	15 November 1940	6 February 1942 (dismissed)	1 year, 83 days	Independent	—		Farouk I (1936–1952)	
(19)		Mostafa El-Nahas Pasha مصطفى النحاس باشا (1879–1965)	6 February 1942	10 October 1944	2 years, 247 days	Wafd Party	—		Farouk I (1936–1952)	
(19)		Mostafa El-Nahas Pasha مصطفى النحاس باشا (1879–1965)	6 February 1942	10 October 1944	2 years, 247 days	Wafd Party	1942		Farouk I (1936–1952)	
26		Ahmad Maher Pasha أحمد ماهر باشا (1888–1945)	10 October 1944	24 February 1945 X	137 days	Saadist Institutional Party	—		Farouk I (1936–1952)	
26		Ahmad Maher Pasha أحمد ماهر باشا (1888–1945)	10 October 1944	24 February 1945 X	137 days	Saadist Institutional Party	1945		Farouk I (1936–1952)	
27		Mahmoud El Nokrashy Pasha محمود فهمي النقراشي باشا (1888–1948)	26 February 1945	17 February 1946	356 days	Saadist Institutional Party	—		Farouk I (1936–1952)	
(21)		Ismail Sidky Pasha إسماعيل صدقي (1875–1950)	17 February 1946	9 December 1946	295 days	Independent	—		Farouk I (1936–1952)	
(27)		Mahmoud El Nokrashy Pasha محمود فهمي النقراشي باشا (1888–1948)	9 December 1946	28 December 1948 X	2 years, 19 days	Saadist Institutional Party	—		Farouk I (1936–1952)	
28		Ibrahim Abdel Hady Pasha إبراهيم عبد الهادى باشا (1896–1981)	28 December 1948	26 July 1949	210 days	Saadist Institutional Party	—		Farouk I (1936–1952)	
(25)		Hussein Sirri Pasha حسين سري باشا (1894–1960)	26 July 1949	12 January 1950	170 days	Independent	—		Farouk I (1936–1952)	
(19)		Mostafa El-Nahas Pasha مصطفى النحاس باشا (1879–1965)	12 January 1950	27 January 1952	2 years, 15 days	Wafd Party	1950		Farouk I (1936–1952)	
(23)		Aly Maher Pasha علي ماهر باشا (1882–1960)	27 January 1952	2 March 1952	35 days	Independent	—		Farouk I (1936–1952)	
29		Ahmed Naguib el-Hilaly Pasha أحمد نجيب الهلالى (1891–1958)	2 March 1952	2 July 1952	122 days	Independent	—		Farouk I (1936–1952)	
(25)		Hussein Sirri Pasha حسين سري باشا (1894–1960)	2 July 1952	22 July 1952	20 days	Independent	—		Farouk I (1936–1952)	
(29)		Ahmed Naguib el-Hilaly Pasha أحمد نجيب الهلالى (1891–1958)	22 July 1952	23 July 1952 (deposed)	1 day	Independent	—		Farouk I (1936–1952)	
(23)		Aly Maher Pasha علي ماهر باشا (1882–1960)	23 July 1952	7 September 1952	46 days	Independent	—		Fuad II (Note: Ruled as a minor, under a Council of Regency.) (1952–1953)	
30		Mohamed Naguib محمد نجيب (1901–1984)	7 September 1952	18 June 1953	284 days	Military / Liberation Rally	—		Fuad II (1952–1953)	
• Republic of Egypt (1953–1958) •
(30)		Mohamed Naguib محمد نجيب (1901–1984)	18 June 1953	25 February 1954	252 days	Military / Liberation Rally	—	Naguib II	Mohamed Naguib (1953–1954)	
31		Gamal Abdel Nasser جمال عبد الناصر (1918–1970)	25 February 1954	8 March 1954	11 days	Military / Liberation Rally	—	Nasser I	Mohamed Naguib (1953–1954)	
(30)		Mohamed Naguib محمد نجيب (1901–1984)	8 March 1954	18 April 1954	41 days	Military / Liberation Rally	—	Naguib III	Mohamed Naguib (1953–1954)	
(31)		Gamal Abdel Nasser جمال عبد الناصر (1918–1970)	18 April 1954	22 February 1958	3 years, 310 days	Military / Liberation Rally (until 1957)	—	Nasser II	Gamal Abdel Nasser (1954–1970)	
(31)		Gamal Abdel Nasser جمال عبد الناصر (1918–1970)	18 April 1954	22 February 1958	3 years, 310 days	Military / Liberation Rally (until 1957)	—	Nasser IV	Gamal Abdel Nasser (1954–1970)	
(31)		Gamal Abdel Nasser جمال عبد الناصر (1918–1970)	18 April 1954	22 February 1958	3 years, 310 days	National Union	1957	Nasser IV	Gamal Abdel Nasser (1954–1970)	
• United Arab Republic (1958–1971) •
(31)		Gamal Abdel Nasser جمال عبد الناصر (1918–1970)	22 February 1958	29 September 1962	4 years, 219 days	National Union	—		Gamal Abdel Nasser (1954–1970)	
32		Ali Sabri على صبرى (1920–1991)	29 September 1962	3 October 1965	3 years, 4 days	National Union (until 1 December 1962)	—		Gamal Abdel Nasser (1954–1970)	
32		Ali Sabri على صبرى (1920–1991)	29 September 1962	3 October 1965	3 years, 4 days	Arab Socialist Union	1964		Gamal Abdel Nasser (1954–1970)	
33		Zakaria Mohieddin زكريا محيى الدين (1918–2012)	3 October 1965	10 September 1966	342 days	Arab Socialist Union	—		Gamal Abdel Nasser (1954–1970)	
34		Mohamed Sedki Sulayman محمد صدقي سليمان (1919–1996)	10 September 1966	19 June 1967	282 days	Arab Socialist Union	—		Gamal Abdel Nasser (1954–1970)	
(31)		Gamal Abdel Nasser جمال عبد الناصر (1918–1970)	19 June 1967	28 September 1970 #	3 years, 101 days	Arab Socialist Union	—		Gamal Abdel Nasser (1954–1970)	
(31)		Gamal Abdel Nasser جمال عبد الناصر (1918–1970)	19 June 1967	28 September 1970 #	3 years, 101 days	Arab Socialist Union	1969		Gamal Abdel Nasser (1954–1970)	
35		Mahmoud Fawzi محمود فوزى (1900–1981)	21 October 1970	11 September 1971	325 days	Arab Socialist Union	—		Anwar Sadat (1970–1981)	
Chairmen of the Executive Council of Southern Region (Egypt) of the • United Arab Republic (1958–1961) •
1		Nureddin Tarraf نور الدين طراف (1910–1995)	7 October 1958	20 September 1960	1 year, 349 days	National Union	—		Gamal Abdel Nasser (1954–1970)	
2		Kamal el-Din Hussein كمال الدين حسين (1921–1999)	20 September 1960	16 August 1961	330 days	National Union	—		Gamal Abdel Nasser (1954–1970)	
• Arab Republic of Egypt (1971–present) •
(35)		Mahmoud Fawzi محمود فوزى (1900–1981)	11 September 1971	16 January 1972	127 days	Arab Socialist Union	—	Fawzi III	Anwar Sadat (1970–1981)	
(35)		Mahmoud Fawzi محمود فوزى (1900–1981)	11 September 1971	16 January 1972	127 days	Arab Socialist Union	—	Fawzi IV	Anwar Sadat (1970–1981)	
(35)		Mahmoud Fawzi محمود فوزى (1900–1981)	11 September 1971	16 January 1972	127 days	Arab Socialist Union	1971	Fawzi IV	Anwar Sadat (1970–1981)	
36		Aziz Sedky عزيز صدقي (1920–2008)	16 January 1972	26 March 1973	1 year, 69 days	Arab Socialist Union	—	A. Sedky	Anwar Sadat (1970–1981)	
37		Anwar Sadat أنور السادات (1918–1981)	26 March 1973	25 September 1974	1 year, 183 days	Arab Socialist Union	—	Sadat I	Anwar Sadat (1970–1981)	
37		Anwar Sadat أنور السادات (1918–1981)	26 March 1973	25 September 1974	1 year, 183 days	Arab Socialist Union	—	Sadat II	Anwar Sadat (1970–1981)	
38		Abdel Aziz Mohamed Hegazy عبد العزيز محمد حجازي (1923–2014)	25 September 1974	16 April 1975	203 days	Arab Socialist Union	—	Hegazy	Anwar Sadat (1970–1981)	
39		Mamdouh Salem ممدوح سالم (1918–1988)	16 April 1975	2 October 1978	3 years, 169 days	Arab Socialist Union (until 1976)	—	Salem I	Anwar Sadat (1970–1981)	
39		Mamdouh Salem ممدوح سالم (1918–1988)	16 April 1975	2 October 1978	3 years, 169 days	Egyptian Arab Socialist Party	—	Salem II	Anwar Sadat (1970–1981)	
39		Mamdouh Salem ممدوح سالم (1918–1988)	16 April 1975	2 October 1978	3 years, 169 days	Egyptian Arab Socialist Party	1976	Salem III	Anwar Sadat (1970–1981)	
39		Mamdouh Salem ممدوح سالم (1918–1988)	16 April 1975	2 October 1978	3 years, 169 days	Egyptian Arab Socialist Party	—	Salem IV	Anwar Sadat (1970–1981)	
39		Mamdouh Salem ممدوح سالم (1918–1988)	16 April 1975	2 October 1978	3 years, 169 days	Egyptian Arab Socialist Party	—	Salem V	Anwar Sadat (1970–1981)	
40		Mustafa Khalil مصطفى خليل (1920–2008)	2 October 1978	15 May 1980	1 year, 226 days	National Democratic Party	—	Khalil I	Anwar Sadat (1970–1981)	
40		Mustafa Khalil مصطفى خليل (1920–2008)	2 October 1978	15 May 1980	1 year, 226 days	National Democratic Party	1979	Khalil II	Anwar Sadat (1970–1981)	
(37)		Anwar Sadat أنور السادات (1918–1981)	15 May 1980	6 October 1981 X	1 year, 144 days	National Democratic Party	—	Sadat III	Anwar Sadat (1970–1981)	
41		Hosni Mubarak حسنى مبارك (1928–2020)	7 October 1981	2 January 1982	87 days	National Democratic Party	—	Mubarak	Hosni Mubarak (1981–2011)	
42		Ahmad Fuad Mohieddin أحمد فؤاد محيي الدين (1926–1984)	2 January 1982	5 June 1984 #	2 years, 155 days	National Democratic Party	—	Mohieddin I	Hosni Mubarak (1981–2011)	
42		Ahmad Fuad Mohieddin أحمد فؤاد محيي الدين (1926–1984)	2 January 1982	5 June 1984 #	2 years, 155 days	National Democratic Party	—	Mohieddin II	Hosni Mubarak (1981–2011)	
43		Kamal Hassan Ali كمال حسن علي (1921–1993)	17 July 1984	4 September 1985	1 year, 49 days	National Democratic Party	1984	Hassan Ali	Hosni Mubarak (1981–2011)	
44		Aly Lotfy Mahmoud علي لطفى محمود (1935–2018)	4 September 1985	9 November 1986	1 year, 66 days	National Democratic Party	—	Lotfy	Hosni Mubarak (1981–2011)	
45		Atef Mohamed Sedky عاطف محمد نجيب صدقي (1930–2005)	10 November 1986	4 January 1996	9 years, 55 days	National Democratic Party	—	A. M. Sedky I	Hosni Mubarak (1981–2011)	
45		Atef Mohamed Sedky عاطف محمد نجيب صدقي (1930–2005)	10 November 1986	4 January 1996	9 years, 55 days	National Democratic Party	1987	A. M. Sedky II	Hosni Mubarak (1981–2011)	
45		Atef Mohamed Sedky عاطف محمد نجيب صدقي (1930–2005)	10 November 1986	4 January 1996	9 years, 55 days	National Democratic Party	1990	A. M. Sedky II	Hosni Mubarak (1981–2011)	
45		Atef Mohamed Sedky عاطف محمد نجيب صدقي (1930–2005)	10 November 1986	4 January 1996	9 years, 55 days	National Democratic Party	—	A. M. Sedky III	Hosni Mubarak (1981–2011)	
46		Kamal Ganzouri كمال الجنزوري (1933–2021)	4 January 1996	5 October 1999	3 years, 274 days	National Democratic Party	1995	Ganzouri I	Hosni Mubarak (1981–2011)	
47		Atef Ebeid عاطف محمد عبيد (1932–2014)	5 October 1999	14 July 2004	4 years, 283 days	National Democratic Party	2000	Ebeid	Hosni Mubarak (1981–2011)	
48		Ahmed Nazif أحمد نظيف (born 1952)	14 July 2004	28 January 2011	6 years, 198 days	National Democratic Party	2005	Nazif	Hosni Mubarak (1981–2011)	
49		Ahmed Shafik أحمد محمد شفيق (born 1941)	29 January 2011	3 March 2011	33 days	Independent	2010	Shafik	Hosni Mubarak (1981–2011)	
49		Ahmed Shafik أحمد محمد شفيق (born 1941)	29 January 2011	3 March 2011	33 days	Independent	2010	Shafik	Supreme Council of the Armed Forces (2011–2012)	
50		Essam Sharaf عصام عبد العزيز شرف (born 1952)	3 March 2011	7 December 2011	279 days	Independent	—	Sharaf	Supreme Council of the Armed Forces (2011–2012)	
(46)		Kamal Ganzouri كمال الجنزوري (1933–2021)	7 December 2011	30 June 2012	206 days	Independent	—	Ganzouri II	Supreme Council of the Armed Forces (2011–2012)	
51		Hesham Qandil هشام قنديل (born 1962)	2 August 2012	8 July 2013	340 days	Independent	—	Qandil	Mohamed Morsi (2012–2013)	
—		Hazem El Beblawi حازم الببلاوي (born 1936) acting	9 July 2013	1 March 2014	265 days	Independent	—	Beblawi	Adly Mansour (2013–2014)	
—		Ibrahim Mahlab إبراهيم محلب (born 1949)	1 March 2014	17 June 2014	138 days	Independent	—	Mahlab I	Adly Mansour (2013–2014)	
52		Ibrahim Mahlab إبراهيم محلب (born 1949)	17 June 2014	19 September 2015	1 year, 64 days	Independent	—	Mahlab II	Abdel Fattah el-Sisi (2014–present)	
52		Ibrahim Mahlab إبراهيم محلب (born 1949)	17 June 2014	19 September 2015	1 year, 64 days	Independent	—	Mahlab III	Abdel Fattah el-Sisi (2014–present)	
53		Sherif Ismail شريف إسماعيل (1955–2023)	19 September 2015	7 June 2018	2 years, 261 days	Independent	—	Ismail	Abdel Fattah el-Sisi (2014–present)	
—		Mostafa Madbouly مصطفي مدبولي (born 1966)	7 June 2018	14 June 2018	7 days	Independent	—		Abdel Fattah el-Sisi (2014–present)	
54		Mostafa Madbouly مصطفي مدبولي (born 1966)	14 June 2018	Incumbent	8 years, 154 days	Independent	—	Madbouly I	Abdel Fattah el-Sisi (2014–present)	
54		Mostafa Madbouly مصطفي مدبولي (born 1966)	14 June 2018	Incumbent	8 years, 154 days	Independent	2020	Madbouly I	Abdel Fattah el-Sisi (2014–present)	
54		Mostafa Madbouly مصطفي مدبولي (born 1966)	14 June 2018	Incumbent	8 years, 154 days	Independent	—	Madbouly II	Abdel Fattah el-Sisi (2014–present)	
54		Mostafa Madbouly مصطفي مدبولي (born 1966)	14 June 2018	Incumbent	8 years, 154 days	Independent	2025	Madbouly II	Abdel Fattah el-Sisi (2014–present)	

== See also ==
- Prime Minister of Egypt
- President of Egypt
  - List of presidents of Egypt
- Vice President of Egypt
- Speaker of the House of Representatives (Egypt)
  - List of speakers of the House of Representatives (Egypt)
