= List of presidents of Egypt =

Current Presidential Standard of Egypt (1984–present)

Former Presidential Standard (1972–1984)

Former Presidential Standard (1953–1958)

The office of President of Egypt is the head of state and the head of government of Egypt and the Supreme Commander of the Egyptian Armed Forces. The president is elected to a six-year term by popular vote, under the Constitution of Egypt.

The first president, Mohamed Naguib, was sworn in following the declaration of the Republic on 18 June 1953. The incumbent president is Abdel Fattah el-Sisi, who assumed office on 8 June 2014.

== Background ==
The first president of Egypt was Mohamed Naguib, one of the leaders of the Free Officers Movement who led the Egyptian Revolution of 1952, and who took office on 18 June 1953, the day on which Egypt was declared a republic. Since then the office has been held by five further people: Gamal Abdel Nasser, Anwar Sadat, Hosni Mubarak, Mohamed Morsi and Abdel Fattah el-Sisi. In addition, Sufi Abu Taleb acted as president between Sadat's assassination and Mubarak's election as his successor, and Adly Mansour acted as president after Morsi's overthrow in the 2013 coup d'état.

Following Mubarak's resignation on 11 February 2011 in the Egyptian Revolution of 2011, the office was vacant, with the functions of head of state and head of government being discharged by the chairman of the Supreme Council of the Armed Forces (SCAF), Field Marshal Muhammad Hussein Tantawy.

On 30 June 2012, Morsi took office after having been elected in the presidential election held on 23–24 May and 16–17 June 2012. He was deposed by the Egyptian Armed Forces in a coup d'état on 3 July 2013, following massive protests calling for his resignation. He was succeeded by Mansour, the head of the Supreme Constitutional Court of Egypt, as Acting President. Mansour was sworn into office in front of the Supreme Constitutional Court on 4 July 2013.

On 8 June 2014, current President el-Sisi took office after having been elected in the presidential election held on 26–28 May 2014. He has been re-elected twice, first in the presidential election held on 26–28 March 2018, and again in the presidential election held on 10–12 December 2023.

== List of officeholders ==
Political parties

Liberation Rally
National Union
Arab Socialist Union
National Democratic
Freedom and Justice

Other affiliations

Military
Unaffiliated

Status

Denotes acting or interim president

Symbols

^{P} Presidential referendum

^{CT} Constitutional and term extension referendum

^{†} Died in office

No.	Portrait	Name (birth–death)	Term of office		Party	Election	Vice President
Republic of Egypt (18 June 1953 – 22 February 1958)
1	Photographic portrait of Mohamed Naguib	Mohamed Naguib محمد نجيب (1901–1984) (Note: Gamal Abdel Nasser acted between 25 February 1954 and 27 February 1954.)	18 June 1953 – 14 November 1954 (Resigned)	1 year, 149 days	Military	—	—
1	Photographic portrait of Mohamed Naguib	Mohamed Naguib محمد نجيب (1901–1984)	18 June 1953 – 14 November 1954 (Resigned)	1 year, 149 days	Liberation Rally	—	—
—	Photographic portrait of Gamal Abdel Nasser	Gamal Abdel Nasser جمال عبد الناصر (1918–1970); Chairman of RCC from 1954 to 1956	14 November 1954 – 23 June 1956	1 year, 222 days	Military	—	—
2	Photographic portrait of Gamal Abdel Nasser	Gamal Abdel Nasser جمال عبد الناصر (1918–1970); Chairman of RCC from 1954 to 1956	23 June 1956 – 22 February 1958	1 year, 244 days	Liberation Rally (until 1957)	1956^{[P]}	—
2	Photographic portrait of Gamal Abdel Nasser	Gamal Abdel Nasser جمال عبد الناصر (1918–1970); Chairman of RCC from 1954 to 1956	23 June 1956 – 22 February 1958	1 year, 244 days	National Union	1956^{[P]}	—
United Arab Republic (22 February 1958 – 11 September 1971)
(2)	Photographic portrait of Gamal Abdel Nasser	Gamal Abdel Nasser جمال عبد الناصر (1918–1970) (Note: On 9 June 1967 Nasser announced his resignation and that his vice president Zakaria Mohieddin will assume his duties, however Mohieddin refused to accept and after protests rejected Nasser's resignation; Nasser reversed the decision a day later.)	22 February 1958 – 28 September 1970^{[†]}	12 years, 218 days	National Union (until 1962)	1958^{[P]}	Sabri al-Asali
(2)	Photographic portrait of Gamal Abdel Nasser	Gamal Abdel Nasser جمال عبد الناصر (1918–1970)	22 February 1958 – 28 September 1970^{[†]}	12 years, 218 days	National Union (until 1962)	1958^{[P]}	Akram al-Hourani
(2)	Photographic portrait of Gamal Abdel Nasser	Gamal Abdel Nasser جمال عبد الناصر (1918–1970)	22 February 1958 – 28 September 1970^{[†]}	12 years, 218 days	National Union (until 1962)	1958^{[P]}	Abdel Latif Boghdadi
(2)	Photographic portrait of Gamal Abdel Nasser	Gamal Abdel Nasser جمال عبد الناصر (1918–1970)	22 February 1958 – 28 September 1970^{[†]}	12 years, 218 days	National Union (until 1962)	1958^{[P]}	Abdel Hakim Amer
(2)	Photographic portrait of Gamal Abdel Nasser	Gamal Abdel Nasser جمال عبد الناصر (1918–1970)	22 February 1958 – 28 September 1970^{[†]}	12 years, 218 days	National Union (until 1962)	1958^{[P]}	Nur al-Din Kahala
(2)	Photographic portrait of Gamal Abdel Nasser	Gamal Abdel Nasser جمال عبد الناصر (1918–1970)	22 February 1958 – 28 September 1970^{[†]}	12 years, 218 days	National Union (until 1962)	1958^{[P]}	Abdul Hamid al-Sarraj
(2)	Photographic portrait of Gamal Abdel Nasser	Gamal Abdel Nasser جمال عبد الناصر (1918–1970)	22 February 1958 – 28 September 1970^{[†]}	12 years, 218 days	National Union (until 1962)	1958^{[P]}	Kamal el-Din Hussein
(2)	Photographic portrait of Gamal Abdel Nasser	Gamal Abdel Nasser جمال عبد الناصر (1918–1970)	22 February 1958 – 28 September 1970^{[†]}	12 years, 218 days	National Union (until 1962)	1958^{[P]}	Zakaria Mohieddin
(2)	Photographic portrait of Gamal Abdel Nasser	Gamal Abdel Nasser جمال عبد الناصر (1918–1970)	22 February 1958 – 28 September 1970^{[†]}	12 years, 218 days	National Union (until 1962)	1958^{[P]}	Hussein el-Shafei
(2)	Photographic portrait of Gamal Abdel Nasser	Gamal Abdel Nasser جمال عبد الناصر (1918–1970)	22 February 1958 – 28 September 1970^{[†]}	12 years, 218 days	Arab Socialist Union	1965^{[P]}	Anwar Sadat
(2)	Photographic portrait of Gamal Abdel Nasser	Gamal Abdel Nasser جمال عبد الناصر (1918–1970)	22 February 1958 – 28 September 1970^{[†]}	12 years, 218 days	Arab Socialist Union	1965^{[P]}	Hassan Ibrahim
(2)	Photographic portrait of Gamal Abdel Nasser	Gamal Abdel Nasser جمال عبد الناصر (1918–1970)	22 February 1958 – 28 September 1970^{[†]}	12 years, 218 days	Arab Socialist Union	1965^{[P]}	Ali Sabri
3	Photographic portrait of Anwar Sadat	Anwar Sadat أنور السادات (1918–1981)	28 September 1970 – 15 October 1970	17 days	Arab Socialist Union	—	Vacant through 30 October 1970
3	Photographic portrait of Anwar Sadat	Anwar Sadat أنور السادات (1918–1981)	15 October 1970 – 11 September 1971	331 days	Arab Socialist Union	1970^{[P]}	Ali Sabri
Arab Republic of Egypt (11 September 1971 – present)
(3)	Photographic portrait of Anwar Sadat	Anwar Sadat أنور السادات (1918–1981)	11 September 1971 – 6 October 1981 (Assassinated)	10 years, 25 days	Arab Socialist Union (until 1978)	1976^{[P]}	Vacant through 16 January 1972
(3)	Photographic portrait of Anwar Sadat	Anwar Sadat أنور السادات (1918–1981)	11 September 1971 – 6 October 1981 (Assassinated)	10 years, 25 days	Arab Socialist Union (until 1978)	1976^{[P]}	Mahmoud Fawzi
(3)	Photographic portrait of Anwar Sadat	Anwar Sadat أنور السادات (1918–1981)	11 September 1971 – 6 October 1981 (Assassinated)	10 years, 25 days	Arab Socialist Union (until 1978)	1976^{[P]}	Vacant after 18 September 1974
(3)	Photographic portrait of Anwar Sadat	Anwar Sadat أنور السادات (1918–1981)	11 September 1971 – 6 October 1981 (Assassinated)	10 years, 25 days	Arab Socialist Union (until 1978)	1976^{[P]}	Hosni Mubarak
(3)	Photographic portrait of Anwar Sadat	Anwar Sadat أنور السادات (1918–1981)	11 September 1971 – 6 October 1981 (Assassinated)	10 years, 25 days	National Democratic	1976^{[P]}	Hosni Mubarak
—	Photographic portrait of Sufi Abu Taleb	Sufi Abu Taleb صوفى أبو طالب (1925–2008); Interim president	6 October 1981 – 14 October 1981	8 days	National Democratic	—	Hosni Mubarak
4	Photographic portrait of Hosni Mubarak	Hosni Mubarak حسنى مبارك (1928–2020)	14 October 1981 – 11 February 2011 (Overthrown)	29 years, 120 days	National Democratic	1981^{[P]}	Vacant through 29 January 2011
4	Photographic portrait of Hosni Mubarak	Hosni Mubarak حسنى مبارك (1928–2020)	14 October 1981 – 11 February 2011 (Overthrown)	29 years, 120 days	National Democratic	1987^{[P]}	Vacant through 29 January 2011
4	Photographic portrait of Hosni Mubarak	Hosni Mubarak حسنى مبارك (1928–2020)	14 October 1981 – 11 February 2011 (Overthrown)	29 years, 120 days	National Democratic	1993^{[P]}	Vacant through 29 January 2011
4	Photographic portrait of Hosni Mubarak	Hosni Mubarak حسنى مبارك (1928–2020)	14 October 1981 – 11 February 2011 (Overthrown)	29 years, 120 days	National Democratic	1999^{[P]}	Vacant through 29 January 2011
4	Photographic portrait of Hosni Mubarak	Hosni Mubarak حسنى مبارك (1928–2020)	14 October 1981 – 11 February 2011 (Overthrown)	29 years, 120 days	National Democratic	2005	Omar Suleiman
—		Mohamed Hussein محمد حسين طنطاوي (1935–2021); Chairman of SCAF (De facto head of state)	11 February 2011 – 30 June 2012	1 year, 140 days	Military	—	Vacant throughout presidency
5	Photographic portrait of Mohamed Morsi	Mohamed Morsi محمد مرسي (1951–2019)	30 June 2012 – 3 July 2013 (Deposed in a coup)	1 year, 3 days	Freedom and Justice	2012	Vacant through 12 August 2012
5	Photographic portrait of Mohamed Morsi	Mohamed Morsi محمد مرسي (1951–2019)	30 June 2012 – 3 July 2013 (Deposed in a coup)	1 year, 3 days	Freedom and Justice	2012	Mahmoud Mekki
5	Photographic portrait of Mohamed Morsi	Mohamed Morsi محمد مرسي (1951–2019)	30 June 2012 – 3 July 2013 (Deposed in a coup)	1 year, 3 days	Freedom and Justice	2012	Vacant after 22 December 2012
5	Photographic portrait of Mohamed Morsi	Mohamed Morsi محمد مرسي (1951–2019)	30 June 2012 – 3 July 2013 (Deposed in a coup)	1 year, 3 days	Freedom and Justice	2012	Abolished after 26 December 2012
—	Photographic portrait of Adly Mansour	Adly Mansour عدلي منصور (b. 1945); Interim president	4 July 2013 – 8 June 2014	339 days	Unaffiliated	—	Abolished through 14 July 2014
—	Photographic portrait of Adly Mansour	Adly Mansour عدلي منصور (b. 1945); Interim president	4 July 2013 – 8 June 2014	339 days	Unaffiliated	—	Mohamed ElBaradei (Interim)
—	Photographic portrait of Adly Mansour	Adly Mansour عدلي منصور (b. 1945); Interim president	4 July 2013 – 8 June 2014	339 days	Unaffiliated	—	Vacant after 14 August 2013
—	Photographic portrait of Adly Mansour	Adly Mansour عدلي منصور (b. 1945); Interim president	4 July 2013 – 8 June 2014	339 days	Unaffiliated	—	Abolished after 18 January 2014
6	Photographic portrait of Abdel Fattah el-Sisi	Abdel Fattah el-Sisi عبد الفتاح السيسى (b. 1954)	8 June 2014 – Incumbent	12 years, 152 days	Unaffiliated	2014	Abolished through 23 April 2019
6	Photographic portrait of Abdel Fattah el-Sisi	Abdel Fattah el-Sisi عبد الفتاح السيسى (b. 1954)	8 June 2014 – Incumbent	12 years, 152 days	Unaffiliated	2018	Abolished through 23 April 2019
6	Photographic portrait of Abdel Fattah el-Sisi	Abdel Fattah el-Sisi عبد الفتاح السيسى (b. 1954)	8 June 2014 – Incumbent	12 years, 152 days	Unaffiliated	2019^{[CT]}	Vacant after 23 April 2019
6	Photographic portrait of Abdel Fattah el-Sisi	Abdel Fattah el-Sisi عبد الفتاح السيسى (b. 1954)	8 June 2014 – Incumbent	12 years, 152 days	Unaffiliated	2023	Vacant after 23 April 2019

== See also ==
- Lists of rulers of Egypt
- President of Egypt
- Vice President of Egypt
- Prime Minister of Egypt
  - List of prime ministers of Egypt
- Speaker of the House of Representatives (Egypt)
  - List of speakers of the House of Representatives (Egypt)

== Bibliography ==
- El-Gawady, Mohamed (1986). Cabinets during period of Revolution.
- Hafez, Salah (2001). Democracy Shock.
