= 1984 Egyptian parliamentary election =

- 27 May 1984

448 of the 458 seats in the People's Assembly of Egypt 230 seats needed for a majority
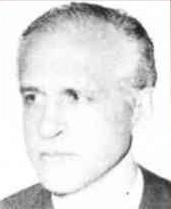

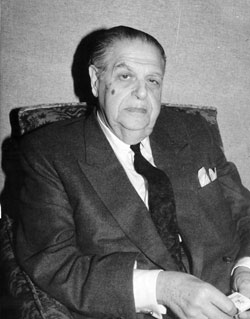
	First party	Second party
Leader	Ahmad Fuad Mohieddin	Fouad Serageddin
Party	NDP	New Wafd–MB
Seats won	390	58
Popular vote	3,756,359	778,131
Percentage	72.99%	15.12%
Prime Minister before election
Ahmad Fuad Mohieddin
NDP
Subsequent Prime Minister
Kamal Hassan Ali
Independent

Parliamentary elections were held in Egypt on 27 May 1984. Since the last election in 1979, changes had been made to the electoral system. The 176 two-member constituencies were replaced by 48 multi-member constituencies (totalling 448 seats), with candidates elected on a party list system, with a party needing over 8% of the vote to win a seat.

The result was a victory for the ruling National Democratic Party, which won 390 of the 448 seats. The New Wafd Party]–Muslim Brotherhood alliance was the only other group to win seats.

Following the election, President Hosni Mubarak appointed a further 10 members to the Assembly; one from the NDP, four from the Socialist Labour Party, one from the National Progressive Unionist Party and four Copts. Voter turnout was 43%.

== Results ==
Party	Votes	%	Seats	+/–
National Democratic Party	3,756,359	72.99	390	+43
New Wafd Party–Muslim Brotherhood (Note: Muslim Brotherhood candidates won 7–12 seats.)	778,131	15.12	58	New
Socialist Labour Party	364,040	7.07	0	–30
National Progressive Unionist Rally Party	214,587	4.17	0	New
Liberal Socialists Party	33,448	0.65	0	–2
Presidential appointees			10	0
Total	5,146,565	100.00	458	+66
Valid votes	5,146,565	96.68		
Invalid/blank votes	176,521	3.32		
Total votes	5,323,086	100.00		
Registered voters/turnout	12,339,417	43.14		
Source: IPU
