= 1979 Egyptian parliamentary election =

- 7 June 1979 (first round); 14 June 1979 (second round)
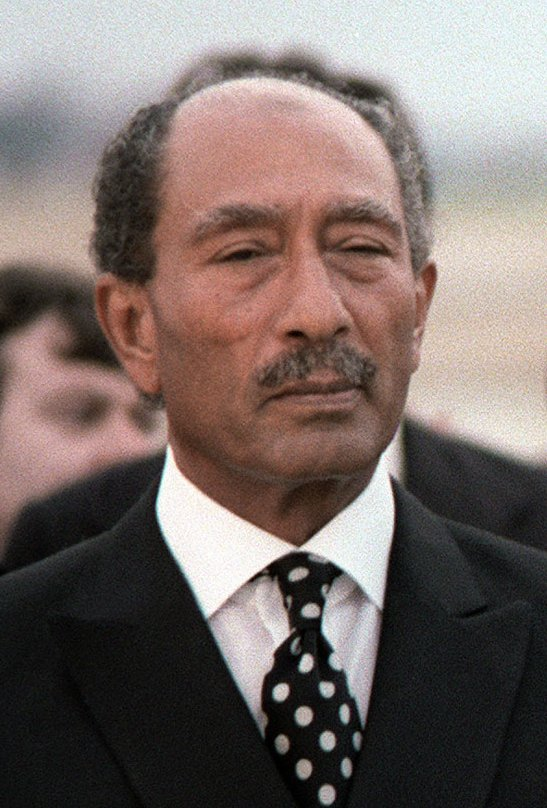

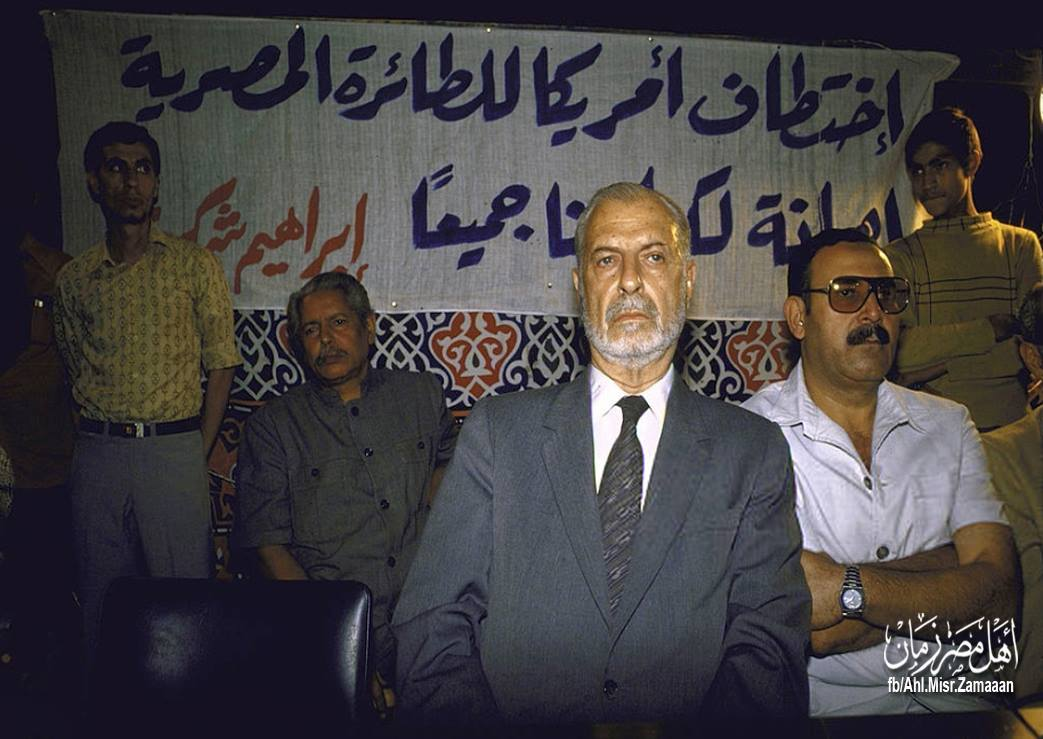
	First party	Second party
Leader	Anwar Sadat	Ibrahim Shoukry
Party	NDP	SLP
Seats won	347	30
Prime Minister before election
Mustafa Khalil
NDP
Subsequent Prime Minister
Mustafa Khalil
NDP

Early parliamentary elections were held in Egypt on 7 June 1979, with a second round for 147 seats being held on 14 June. Following the experimental 1976 elections, in which three different factions of the Arab Socialist Union had competed against each other, the country had returned to multi-party politics. This was confirmed in a referendum on the formation of new parties held in April. The elections were the first multi-party elections since the 1950 parliamentary election, three years before the country became a republic.

Two candidates were elected from each of the 176 constituencies, with a second round of voting required if one or both of the candidates failed to win over 50% of the vote in the first round, or neither of the candidates with over 50% were classed as a worker or farmer (each constituency had to have at least one farmer or worker representing it). In addition, 30 seats were reserved for women, and following the election, the President appointed a further 10 members.

Around 1,600 candidates contested the election, nearly 1,000 of which were independents. The result was a victory for President Anwar Sadat's newly established National Democratic Party, which won 347 of the 392 seats.

== Results ==
Party	Seats	+/–
National Democratic Party	347	New
Socialist Labour Party	30	New
Liberal Socialists Party	2	–13
Independents	13	–34
Total	392	+32
Source: IPU
