= Ahmed Badawi =

Commander in Chief of the Egyptian Armed Forces (1927–1981)

Ahmed Badawy Sayyid Ahmed
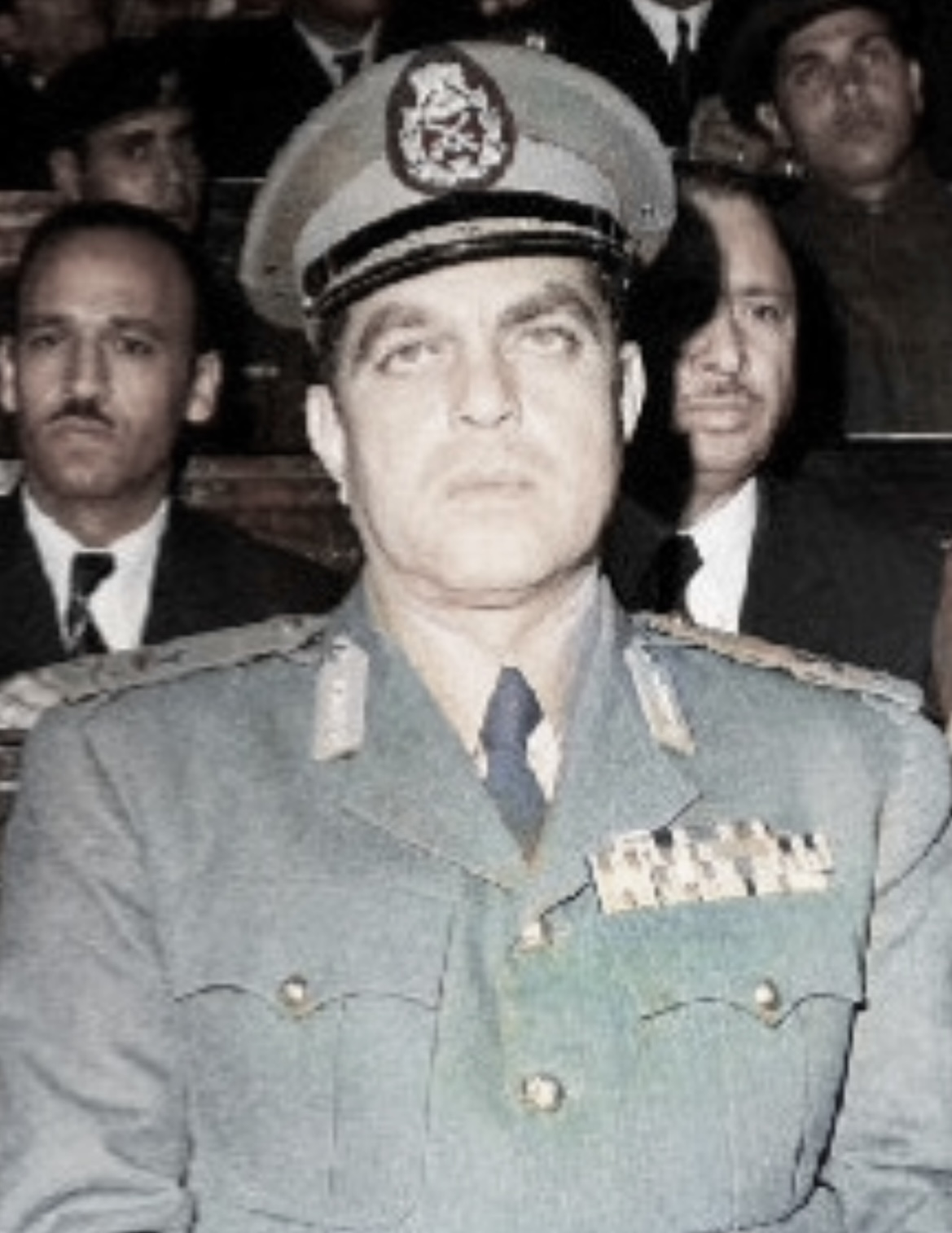

Minister of Defence of Egypt
- In office 14 May 1980 – 2 March 1981
- President: Anwar Sadat
- Prime Minister: Mustafa Khalil; Anwar Sadat
- Preceded by: Kamal Hassan Ali
- Succeeded by: Abd Al-Halim Abu-Ghazala

Personal details
- Born: 3 April 1927 Alexandria, Egypt
- Died: 2 March 1981 (aged 53) Near Siwa, Egypt
- Party: Independent

Military service
- Allegiance: Egypt
- Branch/service: Army
- Years of service: 1948–1981
- Rank: Field Marshal
- Commands: 4th Armoured Division; 7th Infantry Division; Third Field Army; Chief of the General Staff
- Battles/wars: 1948 Palestine war; Suez Crisis; Six-Day War; Yom Kippur War

Ahmed Badawi Sayyid Ahmed (3 April 1927 – 2 March 1981; Arabic: أحمد بدوي سيد أحمد) was an Egyptian Field Marshal (Mushir) and the Chief of the General Staff of the armed forces.

== Early life ==
Ahmed Badawy was born in the coastal city of Alexandria in 1927. He studied commerce at Alexandria University where he obtained his bachelor's degree, he then traveled to Moscow on a scholarship to the M. V. Frunze Military Academy.

== Career ==
He became a senior lecturer at the military academy in 1958 but then he was fired from the military service in 1967. President Anwar El-Sadat then asked him to return to military service at the same time as he became a lecturer at Ain Shams University. As a brigadier general, he commanded the 7th Infantry Division during the Yom Kippur War, and after the Third Army became encircled, was placed in command of the cut-off force. The isolated part of the army was made up of the 7th and 19th Infantry Divisions, plus two independent armoured brigades, on the east bank, and a mixture of units in Suez city itself.

He became the commander of the Training Institute of the Armed Forces and was then promoted to become the Chief of the General Staff of the Egyptian Armed Forces.

On 14 May 1980, Anwar El-Sadat made him the Minister of Defence and Military Production.

== Death ==
A few months after becoming in charge of the ministry of defence, Ahmed Badawy died, along with 13 senior officers, in a helicopter crash on 2 March 1981.
