= Aly Lotfy Mahmoud =

Prime Minister of Egypt from 1985 to 1986

- علي لطفي محمود
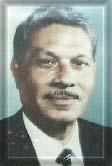

44th Prime Minister of Egypt
- In office 4 September 1985 – 9 November 1986
- President: Hosni Mubarak
- Preceded by: Kamal Hassan Ali
- Succeeded by: Atef Sedky

Personal details
- Born: 6 October 1935 Faiyum, Kingdom of Egypt
- Died: 27 May 2018 (aged 82) Cairo, Egypt
- Party: National Democratic Party (Egypt)

Aly Lotfy Mahmoud (Arabic: علي لطفي محمود, romanized: ʿAlī Luṭfiyy Maḥmūd; 6 October 1935 – 27 May 2018) was an Egyptian politician who served as the 44th prime minister of Egypt from 1985 to 1986.

He was the minister responsible for finance from 1978 to 1980. He served as Prime Minister of Egypt from 4 September 1985 to 9 November 1986.

Political offices
Preceded by Kamal Hassan Ali	Prime Minister of Egypt; 1985–1986	Succeeded by Atef Sedky
