= The Three Revolutions =

The Three Revolutions refers to a political theory of Gamal Abdel Nasser highlighted during a speech to the National Union (NU) in Cairo on July 9, 1960. The three revolutions were first a national revolution which involves the overthrow of colonialism, second, the Arab revolution which involves the defeat of division and false frontiers created by outsiders, and third the social revolution which involves the creation of an honorable living in fulfilment of social equality for every member of Arab society.
