= Adel Taher =

Egyptian politician

- عادل طاهر
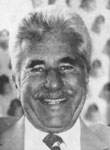

Minister of Tourism and Antiquities
- In office January 1982 – August 1982
- President: Hosni Mubarak
- Prime Minister: Ahmad Fuad Mohieddin
- Preceded by: Ali Jamal al-Nazer
- Succeeded by: Tawfiq Abdo Ismail

Personal details
- Born: 7 October 1923
- Died: unknown

Adel Taher (Arabic: عادل طاهر) was the Egyptian Minister of Tourism and Civil Aviation in 1982.
