= Atef Sedky =

Prime Minister of Egypt from 1986 to 1996

- عاطف صدقي
- Sedky, c. 1986

45th Prime Minister of Egypt
- In office 10 November 1986 – 2 January 1996
- President: Hosni Mubarak
- Preceded by: Aly Mahmoud Lotfy
- Succeeded by: Kamal Ganzouri

Personal details
- Born: 29 August 1930 Tanta, Kingdom of Egypt
- Died: 25 February 2005 (aged 74) Cairo, Egypt
- Party: National Democratic Party

Atef Mohamed Naguib Sedky (29 August 1930 – 25 February 2005; Egyptian Arabic: عاطف محمد نجيب صدقى, IPA: [ˈʕɑːtˤef mæˈħæmmæd næˈɡiːb ˈsedʔi]) was an Egyptian lawyer, politician, and economist who served as the 45th prime minister of Egypt from 1986 until 1996. He replaced Aly Mahmoud Lotfy on November 10, 1986.

== Private career ==
Sedky was born in the Nile Delta city of Tanta. He was a lawyer and economist by training, receiving a doctorate in economics from the University of Paris in France. Before becoming prime minister, he was the director of the Egyptian Central Auditing Organization.

== Political career ==
As prime minister, Sedky supervised and sometimes criticised reforms suggested by the International Monetary Fund. In November 1993, he survived an assassination attempt in Cairo by the militant Islamic group Vanguards of Conquest, which resulted in the death of a schoolgirl called Shaimaa. He led his mandate without the assistance of the IMF. On 2 January 1996, he along with his cabinet resigned; his post was filled two days later by Kamal Ganzouri. Sedky is the longest serving Egyptian prime minister since the Republic in 1953.

== Death ==
He died on 25 February 2005 at a Cairo hospital.

== Private life ==
In 2004, Sedky fractured his thigh. Sedky and his German-born wife, Ursula, had two children Ahmed and Sherif.

Political offices
Preceded by Aly Lotfy Mahmoud	Prime Minister of Egypt; 1986–1996	Succeeded by Kamal Ganzouri
