= 1999 Egyptian presidential confirmation referendum =

- 26 September 1999
- Registered: 23,934,907
- Turnout: 79.21%
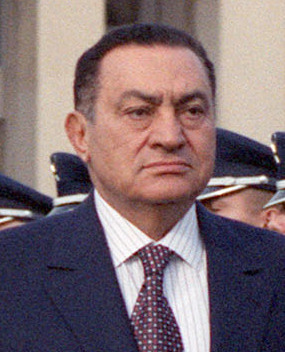
Nominee	Hosni Mubarak
Party	NDP
Popular vote	17,554,856
Percentage	93.79%
President before election
Hosni Mubarak
NDP
Elected President
Hosni Mubarak
NDP

Presidential elections were held in Egypt on 26 September 1999. The vote took the form of a referendum on the candidacy of Hosni Mubarak after he was nominated for the post by the People's Assembly. Mubarak was supported by all four main opposition parties, with the exception of the Nasserist Party.

His candidacy was approved by 94% of voters, with voter turnout reported to be 79%.

== Background ==
The People's Assembly nominated Mubarak on 2 June by a vote of 443 to zero, with 11 abstentions.

== Results ==
Candidate	Party	Votes	%
Hosni Mubarak	National Democratic Party	17,554,856	93.79
Against		1,162,525	6.21
Total		18,717,381	100.00
Valid votes		18,717,381	98.73
Invalid/blank votes		240,512	1.27
Total votes		18,957,893	100.00
Registered voters/turnout		23,934,907	79.21
Source: Direct Democracy
