= Kamal Hassan Ali =

Egyptian politician and war hero (1921-1993)

- كمال حسن علي
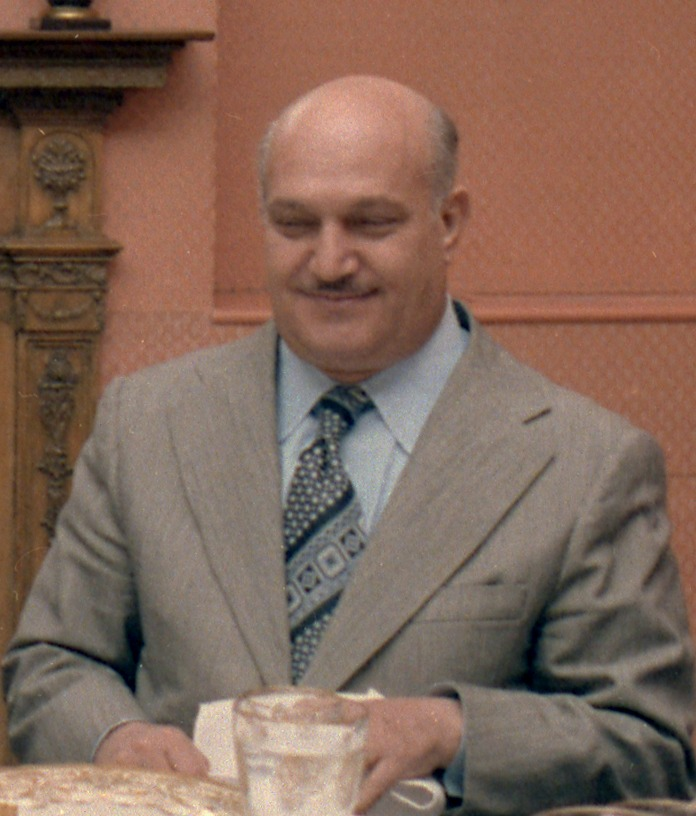
- Kamal in 1978

43rd Prime Minister of Egypt
- In office 17 July 1984 – 4 September 1985
- President: Hosni Mubarak
- Preceded by: Ahmad Fuad Mohieddin
- Succeeded by: Aly Lotfy Mahmoud

Minister of Foreign Affairs
- In office 15 May 1980 – 16 June 1984
- President: Anwar Sadat
- Preceded by: Mustafa Khalil
- Succeeded by: Ahmed Asmat Abdel-Meguid

Minister of Defense
- In office 5 October 1978 – 14 May 1980
- President: Anwar Sadat
- Preceded by: Abdel Ghani el-Gamasy
- Succeeded by: Ahmed Badawi

Director of the Egyptian General Intelligence Directorate
- In office 15 May 1975 – 26 October 1978
- President: Anwar Sadat
- Preceded by: Ahmad Abdulsalam Tawfiq
- Succeeded by: Mohamed Saeed El Mahy

Personal details
- Born: 18 September 1921 Cairo, Sultanate of Egypt
- Died: 27 March 1993 (aged 71) Cairo, Egypt

Military service
- Allegiance: Egypt
- Branch/service: Egyptian Army
- Years of service: 1942–1980
- Rank: Colonel General
- Unit: Corps of Engineers (6th Sapper Battalion)
- Commands: Commander-in-Chief of the Armed Forces
- Battles/wars: World War II; 1948 Arab–Israeli War; Suez Crisis; North Yemen Civil War; Six-Day War; Yom Kippur War

General Kamal Hassan Ali (Arabic: كمال حسن علي, romanized: Kamāl Ḥasan ʿAlī, IPA: [kæˈmæːl ˈħæsæn ˈʕæli]; 18 September 1921 – 27 March 1993) was an Egyptian politician and military hero.

== Biography ==
Kamal was born in Cairo on 18 September 1921. He attended medical school, but did not finish it and joined military academy. He was commissioned as a combat engineering officer in 1942, and served as a sapper and pioneer commander with the British Army during World War II.

He was involved in the 1948 Arab–Israeli War and as Engineer-in-Chief the Yom Kippur War. Between 1973 and 1975, he was commander of the Central Military Zone. He was head of the Egyptian Intelligence Service from 1975 to 1978. After that, he served as minister of defense and military production under president Anwar Sadat. Kamal also played a role in peace negotiations between Egypt and Israel, resulting in a treaty in 1979. From 1980 to 1984, he was the deputy prime minister and foreign secretary.

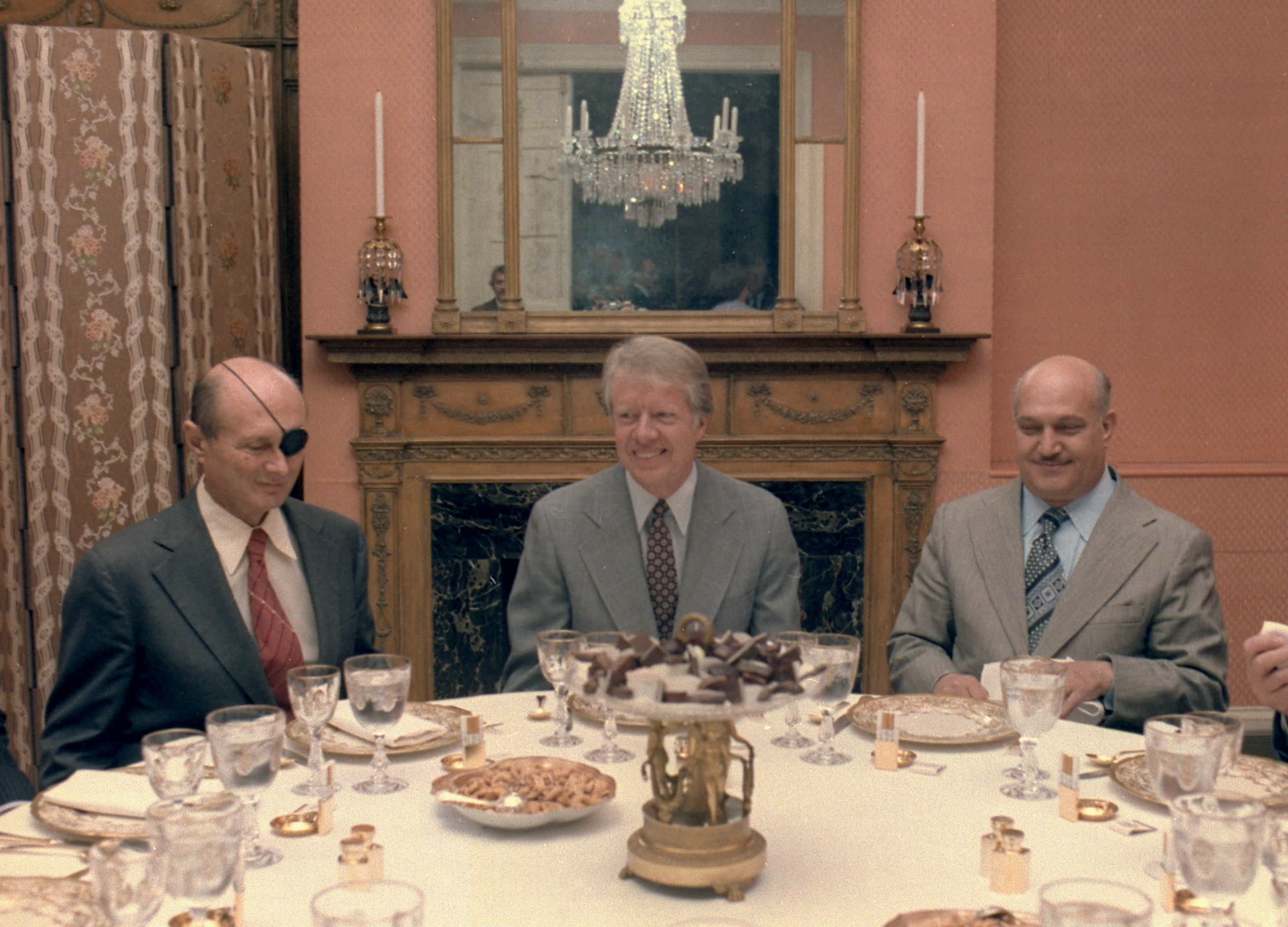
Ali, Jimmy Carter and Moshe Dayan at Blair House, 1978.

He was the Prime Minister of Egypt from 17 July 1984 to 4 September 1985. Then he became the chairman of the Egyptian-Gulf Bank in 1986. He was head of the Egyptian General Intelligence Directorate from 1986 to 1989.

Kamal Hassan Ali was married to Amal Khairy and had three children. He died in Cairo on 27 March 1993 at the age of 71 and was buried with a military funeral.

Political offices
Preceded by Ahmad Fuad Mohieddin	Prime Minister of Egypt; 17 July 1984 – 4 September 1985	Succeeded by Aly Lotfy Mahmoud
Preceded by Mustafa Khalil	Foreign Minister of Egypt; 1980–1984	Succeeded by Ahmed Asmat Abdel-Meguid
Preceded by Mohamed Abdel Ghani el-Gamasy	Defense Minister of Egypt; 1978–1980	Succeeded by Ahmed Badawi
