= 1981 Egyptian presidential confirmation referendum =

- 13 October 1981
- Registered: 12,028,462
- Turnout: 81.10%
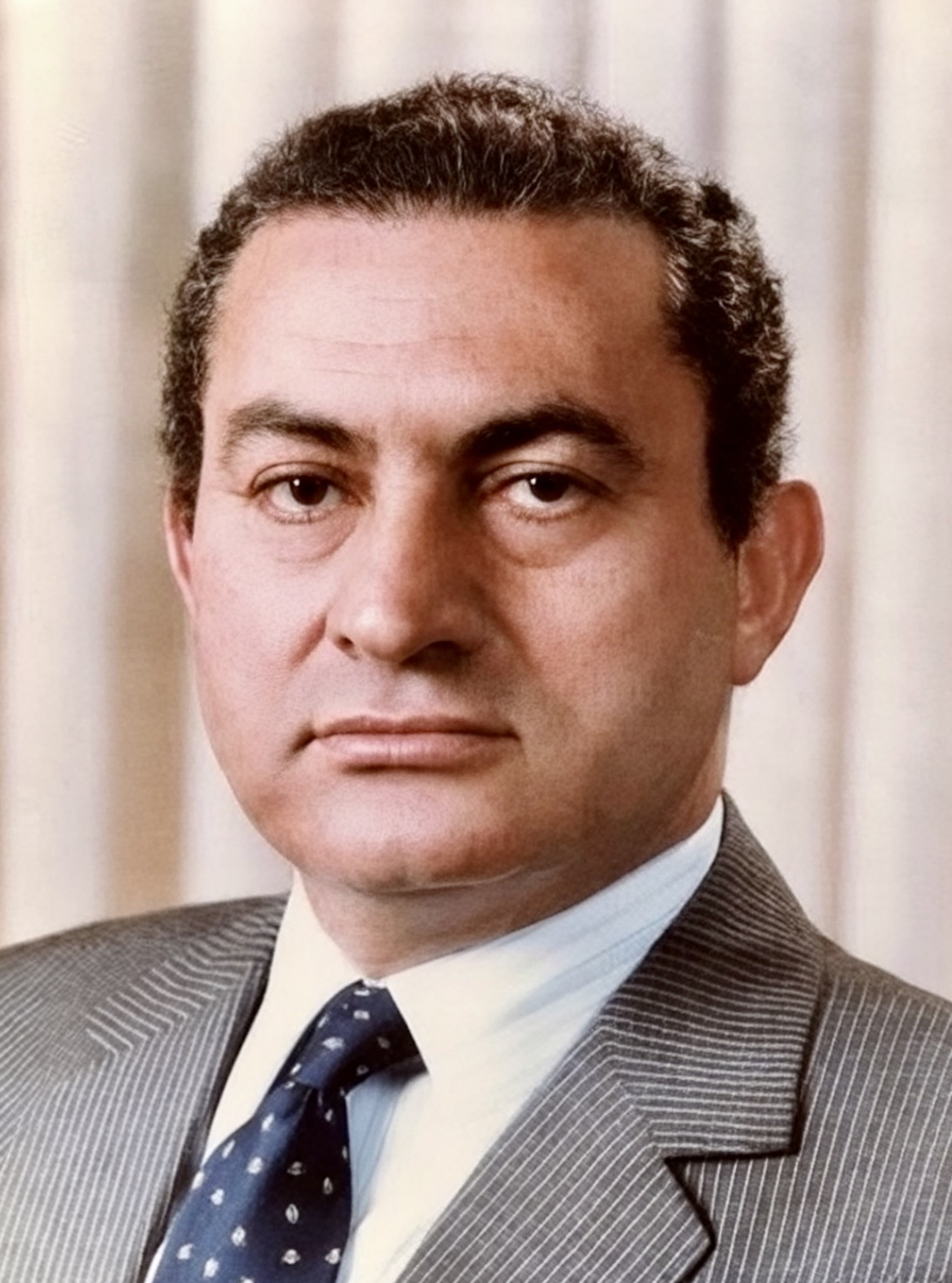
| Nominee | Hosni Mubarak |
| Party | NDP |
| Popular vote | 9,567,904 |
| Percentage | 98.46% |
President before election
Sufi Abu Taleb (acting)
NDP
Elected President
Hosni Mubarak
NDP

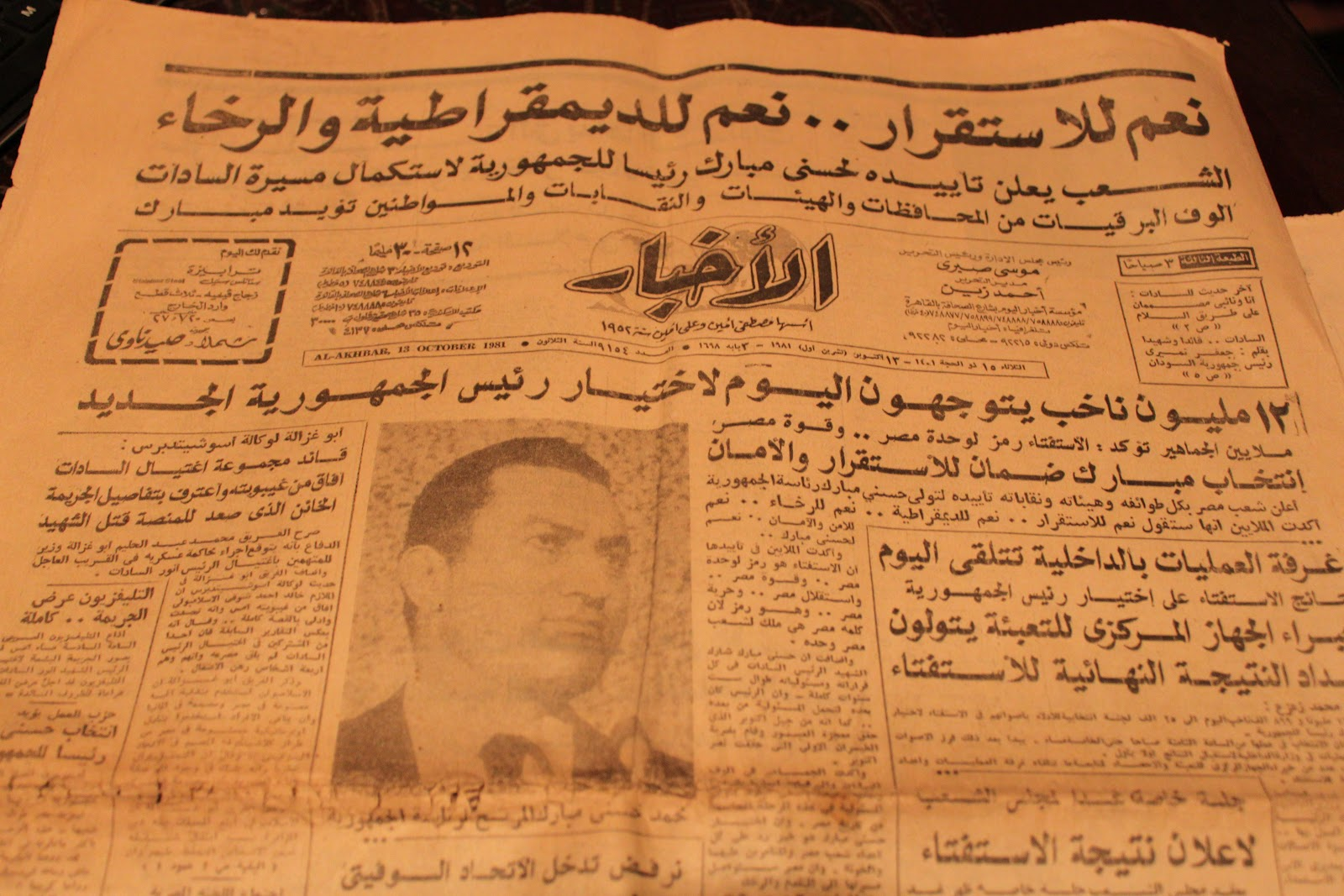
Al Akhbar newspaper with the headline "Yes to stability.. Yes to democracy and prosperity"

Presidential elections were held in Egypt on 13 October 1981 following the assassination of President Anwar Sadat on 6 October. House of Representatives speaker Sufi Abu Taleb became acting president until the new president was elected. The vote took the form of a referendum on the candidacy of vice president and interim prime minister Hosni Mubarak. According to the official results, 98% of voters voted in favour of Mubarak with voter turnout reported to be 81%.

== Results ==
| Candidate | Party | Votes | % |
|---|---|---|---|
| Hosni Mubarak | National Democratic Party | 9,567,904 | 98.46 |
| Against | | 149,650 | 1.54 |
| Total | | 9,717,554 | 100.00 |
| Valid votes | | 9,717,554 | 99.62 |
| Invalid/blank votes | | 37,212 | 0.38 |
| Total votes | | 9,754,766 | 100.00 |
| Registered voters/turnout | | 12,028,462 | 81.10 |
Source: Nohlen et al.
