= 1979 Egyptian referendum =

A double referendum was held in Egypt on 19 April 1979. The two subjects were the Egypt–Israel peace treaty and changes to the country's political system, including the reintroduction of multi-party politics and the change to a bicameral Parliament through the creation of the Shura Council. The Peace Treaty was approved by 99.9% of voters, whilst the political reforms were approved by 99.7%. Voter turnout was 90.2%.

== Results ==
=== Egypt–Israel Peace Treaty ===
Choice	Votes	%
For	9,900,271	99.9
Against	10,217	0.1
Invalid/blank votes	9,772	-
Total	9,920,260	100
Registered voters/turnout	10,998,675	90.2

=== Political reforms ===
Choice	Votes	%
For	9,890,271	99.7
Against	20,217	0.3
Invalid/blank votes	9,772	-
Total	9,920,260	100
Registered voters/turnout	10,998,675	90.2
