= 1987 Egyptian presidential confirmation referendum =

- 5 October 1987
- Registered: 14,368,247
- Turnout: 88.47%
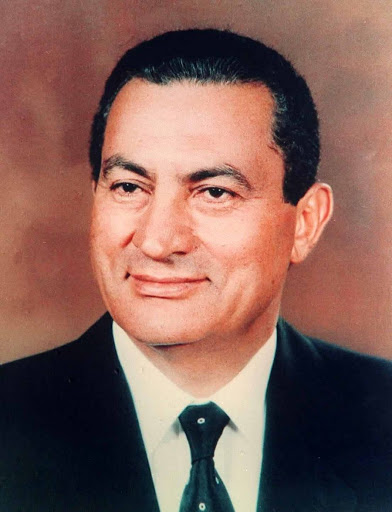
Nominee	Hosni Mubarak
Party	NDP
Popular vote	12,083,627
Percentage	97.10%
President before election
Hosni Mubarak
NDP
Elected President
Hosni Mubarak
NDP

Presidential elections were held in Egypt on 5 October 1987. The vote took the form of a referendum on the candidacy of Hosni Mubarak, who had been nominated by the two-thirds required in the People's Assembly on 5 July. Just over 97% of voters allegedly voted in favour with an 88.5% turnout.

== Results ==
Candidate	Party	Votes	%
Hosni Mubarak	National Democratic Party	12,083,627	97.10
Against		361,395	2.90
Total		12,445,022	100.00
Valid votes		12,445,022	97.90
Invalid/blank votes		266,762	2.10
Total votes		12,711,784	100.00
Registered voters/turnout		14,368,247	88.47
Source: Nohlen et al.
