= Mustafa Khalil =

Prime Minister of Egypt from 1978 to 1980

- مصطفى خليل
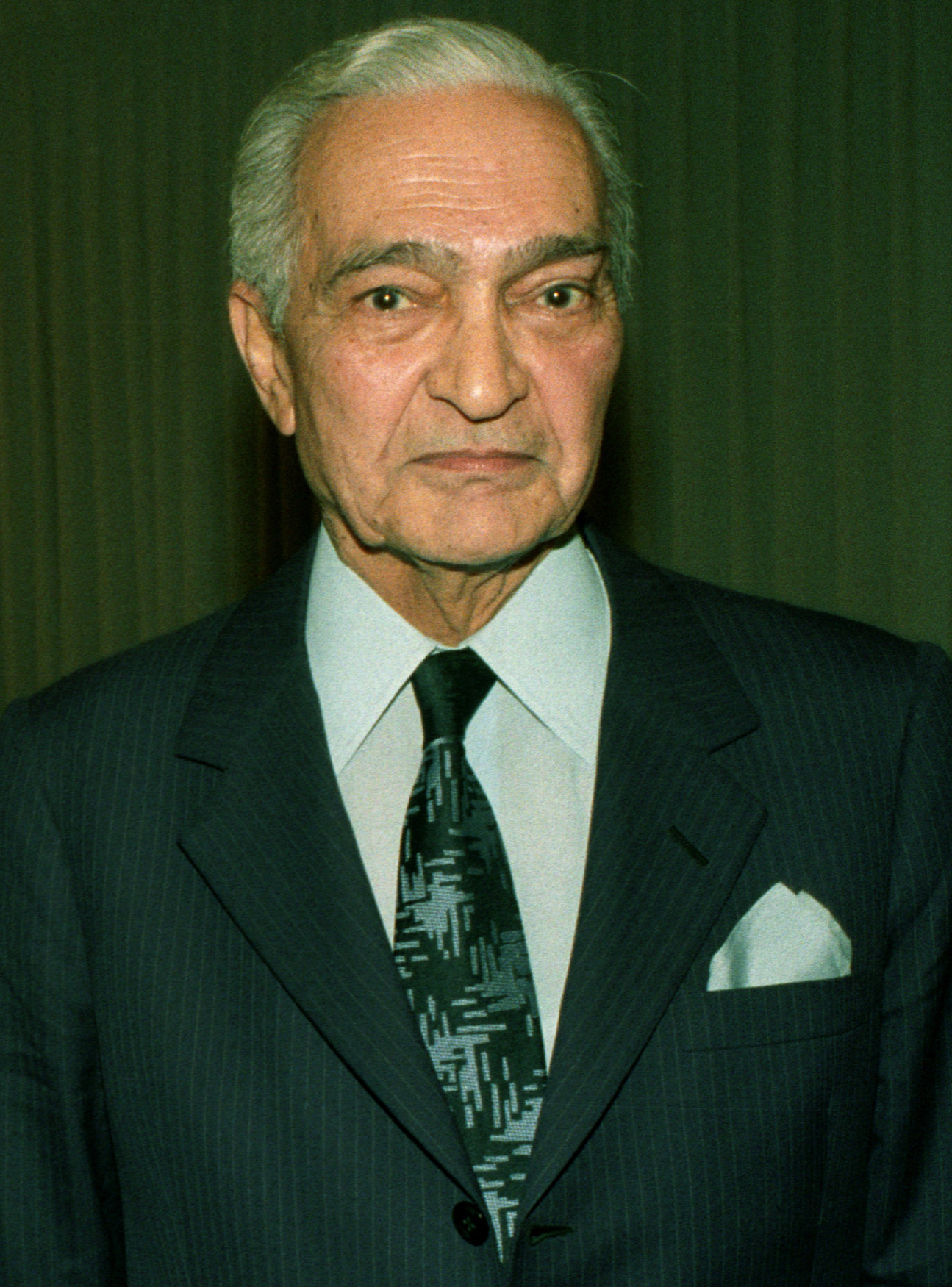
- Khalil in 1992

40th Prime Minister of Egypt
- In office 2 October 1978 – 15 May 1980
- President: Anwar Sadat
- Preceded by: Mamdouh Salem
- Succeeded by: Anwar Sadat

Personal details
- Born: 18 November 1920 Al Qalyubiyah Governorate, Sultanate of Egypt
- Died: 7 June 2008 (aged 87) Cairo, Egypt
- Party: National Democratic Party
- Spouse: Nehal

Mustafa Khalil (Arabic: مصطفى خليل, romanized: Muṣṭafā Ḫalīl, IPA: [mosˈtˤɑfɑ xæˈliːl]; 18 November 1920 – 7 June 2008) was an Egyptian politician and Prime Minister of Egypt from October 2, 1978, to May 15, 1980. Khalil also served as the Egyptian Foreign Minister from February 17, 1979, until May 15, 1980, upon the resignation of the position's incumbent over objections on peace talks between Egypt and Israel. Khalil was best known for his integral role in the negotiations that led to the 1979 Camp David Accord peace treaty between Egypt and Israel.

== Life and career ==
Mustafa Khalil accompanied Egyptian President Anwar Sadat on his historic first visit to Jerusalem, in November 1977 to meet with the Prime Minister of Israel Menachem Begin. Khalil was also the secretary general of the Arab Socialist Union at the time. The visit by Anwar Sadat and Khalil paved the way for negotiations by United States President Jimmy Carter, which ultimately led to the Camp David Accords. Former United Nations Secretary General Boutros Boutros-Ghali, who served as the deputy prime minister for foreign affairs under Khalil and also travelled with Khalil and Anwar Sadat to Israel in 1977, has talked about the important role which Khalil played in the peace negotiations, "Khalil contributed in serving the country for over 50 years and took part in making peace and building the basis of development...We continued negotiations together that ended in the Egyptian-Israeli peace treaty that launched the peace process in the region."

Khalil served as the Prime Minister of Egypt from 1978 until 1980. In his last years, Khalil served as the deputy chairman of the National Democratic Party, which was the governing party of Egypt. He stepped down from that position in November 2007. He was born in the Al Qalyubiyah Governorate. Khalil attended the University of Illinois at Urbana-Champaign where he received a master's degree and doctorate in 1948 and 1951.

Mustafa Khalil died on June 7, 2008, at the age of 88 at a hospital in Cairo, Egypt. According to MENA, Egypt's state-run news agency, Khalil was being treated at the hospital of an unspecified illness at the time. He was survived by his wife, Nehal, his son Egyptian businessman and former parliamentarian Hisham Mustafa Khalil and daughter Zeinab Khalil. His state funeral on June 9, 2008, was a big affair attended by Egyptian President Hosni Mubarak and dignitaries from Egypt and abroad.

Political offices
Preceded by Mamdouh Muhammad Salem	Prime Minister of Egypt; 1978–1980	Succeeded by Anwar Sadat
Preceded by Muhammad Ibrahim Kamel	Foreign Minister of Egypt; 1979–1980	Succeeded by Kamal Hassan Ali
Preceded by Gamal Salem	Transport Minister of Egypt; 1956-1964	Succeeded by Mohamed Mahmoud Ryad
Preceded by Aziz Sedky	Petroleum Minister of Egypt; 1965–1965	Succeeded by Mahmoud Younis
