= 1993 Egyptian presidential confirmation referendum =

- 4 October 1993
- Registered: 18,897,866
- Turnout: 84.16%
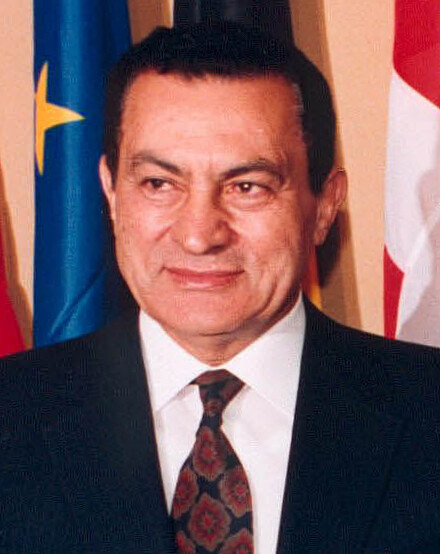
Nominee	Hosni Mubarak
Party	NDP
Popular vote	15,095,025
Percentage	96.28%
President before election
Hosni Mubarak
NDP
Elected President
Hosni Mubarak
NDP

Presidential elections were held in Egypt on 4 October 1993. The vote took the form of a referendum on the candidacy of Hosni Mubarak after he was nominated for the post by a 439–9 vote in the People's Assembly on 21 July. His candidacy for a third consecutive six-year term was allegedly approved by 96.3% of voters, with a turnout of 84.2%.

== Results ==
Candidate	Party	Votes	%
Hosni Mubarak	National Democratic Party	15,095,025	96.28
Against		583,467	3.72
Total		15,678,492	100.00
Valid votes		15,678,492	98.58
Invalid/blank votes		226,020	1.42
Total votes		15,904,512	100.00
Registered voters/turnout		18,897,866	84.16
Source: Nohlen et al.
