= 1883 Egyptian parliamentary election =

A three-stage parliamentary election was held in Egypt in 1883, with 13.3% of the population eligible to vote.

== Electoral system ==
The country's electoral system was designed by Lord Dufferin, who was said by The Times to have "adopted the design of a pyramid". The first stage of the election involved the election of one "election delegate" (for which there was no eligibility criteria) in around 4,300 village constituencies. A total of 797,571 citizens were eligible to vote in the first stage. The delegates then met in the provincial capitals to elect a Provincial Council. The fourteen Provincial Councils then elected one member each to the Legislative Council.

Cairo was divided into twelve quarters, with each quarter holding one delegate, with 65,016 people eligible to vote. The twelve delegates then elected a single member of the Legislative Council. Alexandria was divided into four quarters, each electing a delegate. Together with the single delegates elected from Damietta, Port Said, Rosetta, Suez, El Arish and Ismailia, they elected one member of the Legislative Council.

== Provincial Councils ==
The country had fourteen Provincial Councils with between three and eight members. Only delegates were eligible to be elected to the councils, with the additional criteria that prospective members had to be over the age of 30, literate, pay at least £50 of land tax a year and not be a soldier or functionary.

Province	Registered voters	Electors	Councillors
Asyut	78,589	330	7
Beheira	33,832	311	5
Beni Suef	20,965	200	4
Dakahlia	80,132	451	6
Eaneh	15,482	163	4
Faiyum	30,265	90	3
Gallioubieh	25,032	164	4
Gharbia Governorate	144,534	544	8
Giza	42,073	202	4
Girga	108,991	646	5
Minya	14,185	290	4
Monufia	105,471	345	6
Qena	26,620	114	4
Sharqia	71,400	445	6
Total	797,571	4,295	70
Source: The Times

== Legislative Council ==
The Legislative Council was composed of 30 members, 14 of which were elected by the Provincial Councils, 14 appointed by the Khedive on the advice of his ministers, one elected by the Cairo delegates and one elected by the delegates from the seven other cities. It met six times a year, starting in February, then in every other month.

== General Council ==
A General Council was also convened. This had 84 members, consisting of the eight ministers of the Khedive, the 30 members of the Legislative Council, and a further 46 members elected by electors from the village constituencies, cities and towns. The same eligibility criteria as the Provincial Councils was applied to members, except for the land tax requirement, which was reduced to £20 in Cairo and Alexandria and zero for the rest of the country.

Supplmentary General Council members by electoral district
Area	Members
Cairo	4
Alexandria	3
Damietta	1
Rosetta	1
Suez/Port Said	1
Ismailia/El Arish	1
Lower Egypt provinces	20
Upper Egypt provinces	15
Total	46
Source: The Times
