= Ahmad Fuad Mohieddin =

Egyptian politician (1926-1984)

- أحمد فؤاد محيي الدين
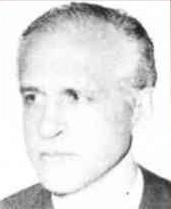

42nd Prime Minister of Egypt
- In office 3 January 1982 – 5 June 1984
- President: Hosni Mubarak
- Preceded by: Hosni Mubarak
- Succeeded by: Kamal Hassan Ali

Personal details
- Born: January 11, 1926 Qalyubiyya Governorate, Kingdom of Egypt
- Died: June 5, 1984 (aged 58) Cairo, Egypt
- Party: Independent
- Education: Cairo University
- Occupation: Politician, Doctor

Ahmad Fuad Mohieddin (Arabic: أحمد فؤاد محيي الدين, romanized: Aḥmad Fuʾād Muḥyī ad-Dīn, IPA: [ˈæħmæd foˈʔæːd ˈmoħj edˈdiːn]; 11 January 1926 – 5 June 1984) was the 42nd Prime Minister of Egypt from 2 January 1982 to 5 June 1984.

== Career ==
Mahieddin was a member of the Arab Socialist Union and was part of its secret unit, the Socialist Vanguard (Arabic: al-Tanzim al-Tali‘i), which was also called the Vanguard Organization. He then joined the National Democratic Party.

Political offices
Preceded by Hosni Mubarak	Prime Minister of Egypt; 2 January 1982 - 5 June 1984	Succeeded by Kamal Hassan Ali
