= Liberation Rally =

Egyptian political movement

Liberation Rally هيئة التحرير
- Chairman: Gamal Abdel Nasser
- Supreme Council: Fathi Radwan; Salah Salem; Kamal al-Din Hussein; Anwar al-Sadat; Nur al-Din Tarraf; Ahmad Hassan al-Baqori; Ahmad al-Sherbasi; Ahmad Abd Allah Tuaima; Hussein al-Sayyid Abd al-Qadir
- Founded: 23 January 1953 (announced); 10 February 1953 (launched)
- Dissolved: 28 May 1957
- Preceded by: Free Officers Movement (as military faction)
- Succeeded by: National Union
- Headquarters: Cairo, Egypt
- Ideology: Majority: Egyptian nationalism Arab nationalism Pan-Arabism Arab socialism Anti-colonialism Anti-British sentiment Anti-Zionism Republicanism (from June 1953); Factions: Secularism Islamism Progressivism Conservatism Islamic socialism Constitutional monarchism (until June 1953)
- Political position: Catch-all
- Slogan: "Union, order and action" (الاتحاد والنظام والعمل)

The Liberation Rally (Arabic: هيئة التحرير, romanized: Hayʾa at-Taḥrīr) was a short-lived political organization created after the Egyptian revolution of 1952 to organize popular support for the government. Formed around a month after all other parties were outlawed, it supported pan-Arabism, Arab socialism, and British withdrawal from the Suez Canal. The Rally was dissolved later in the 1950s and replaced by the National Union.
