= Nureddin Tarraf =

Egyptian politician (1910–1995)

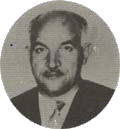
Nureddin Tarraf

Nureddin Ali Tarraf (April 3, 1910 – May 23, 1995) was an Egyptian physician and politician who held several ministerial positions and was the head of the Executive Council of the Egyptian Territory in the United Arab Republic (UAR) from October 1958 to September 1960.

== Career ==
Tarraf was elected as a member of the Egyptian Parliament in 1945, then was appointed Minister of Health twice, the first from 7 September 1952 to 7 October 1958, and the second from 15 August to 17 October 1961. He served as Chairmen of the Executive Council of Southern (Egypt) Region in the United Arab Republic, which was the title for the head of government, from October 7, 1958 to September 20, 1960, to be the first civilian prime minister since the abolishment of the monarchy. He was a member of the Supreme Council of the Editorial Board.

== Family ==
Nureddin Tarraf married Anisa Al-Hefni, Professor of Pediatrics at Qasr El Eyni College of Medicine, and they had 3 children; Yahya Tarraf, Professor of Orthopedics at Kasr Al-Ainy, Dr. Hisham Tarraf, Professor of respiratory Diseases and Allergy at Kasr Al-Ainy, and Khaled Tarraf.
