= National Democratic Party (Egypt) =

Former political party in Egypt

National Democratic Party الحزب الوطني الديمقراطي
- Founded: 2 October 1978
- Banned: 16 April 2011
- Preceded by: Arab Socialist Union
- Newspaper: The Homeland Today
- Membership: 1.9 million (2010 est.)
- Ideology: Egyptian nationalism
- Political position: Centre
- International affiliation: Socialist International (1989–2011)
- Colors: Green Sky Blue

Website
- www.ndp.org.eg (web Archive, English version)

The National Democratic Party (Arabic: الحزب الوطني الديمقراطي, romanized: El-Ḥizb el-Waṭanī ed-Dīmuqrāṭī), often referred to in Egypt as simply the National Party (Arabic: الحزب الوطني, romanized: El-Ḥizb el-Waṭanī), was the ruling political party in Egypt from 1978 to 2011. It was founded by President Anwar Sadat in 1978. The NDP wielded uncontested power in state politics, usually considered a de facto single party, with authoritarian characteristics, inside an officially multi-party system, from its creation until the resignation of Sadat's successor Hosni Mubarak in response to the Egyptian Revolution of 2011.

The National Democratic Party was an authoritarian centrist party. From its inception, it was by far the most powerful of the parties to emerge from the Arab Socialist Union (ASU), the former ruling sole party since 1962, and was as such seen as its organic successor. In contrast to ASU's strong emphasis on Arab nationalism and Arab socialism (Nasserism), the NDP developed into a moderate centrist party. The NDP was a member of the Socialist International from 1989 until it was expelled in 2011 in response to the revolution. The party was dissolved on 16 April 2011 by court order, and its assets were transferred to the state.

== Electoral system in Egypt under the NDP ==
The electoral system in Egypt, under which the National Democratic Party operated, did not meet internationally recognized standards of electoral democracies. According to the Freedom House, the political system was designed to ensure solid majorities for the ruling NDP at all levels of government. In 2009, Dr. Ali El Deen Hilal Dessouki, Media Secretary of the NDP, described Egypt as a "pharaonic" political system, and democracy as a long-term goal. Although former President Hosni Mubarak himself boasted shortly before his deposition from power that Egypt enjoys "all kinds of democracy," substantive democracy and civil liberties within the country remained elusive. In the 2000s, it was stated that "The truth of the matter is that participation and pluralism are now at lower levels than at any time since Mubarak assumed the presidency in the wake of Anwar Sadat's assassination." In 2010, Freedom House ranked Egypt's Political Rights Score at 6 and Civil Liberties Score at 5, with 1 being the freest and 7 the least free.

Until Mubarak's deposition, Egypt had operated under a "state of emergency" for all but five months since 1967, allowing the president to outlaw demonstrations, hold detainees indefinitely without trial, and issue law by decree. Generally, emergency law provides the government with the authority to control every level of political activity, including that within the confines of the formally defined political arena. The duration of the law is three years, but was routinely renewed. The trend began when President Gamel Abdel Nasser succeeded in establishing a state of emergency in 1956, following the invasion of Egypt by Britain, France, and Israel, and continued until 1963 on the basis of the continuing threat of an offensive against Egypt. Nasser declared another state of emergency in June 1967 because of the Six-Day War, which lasted through the War of Attrition, the October War, and the later years of Anwar El-Sadat's presidency, which were characterized by significant political, economic, and social upheaval and discontent. In total, the state of emergency declared during the 1967 war lasted for 13 years. After Sadat's assassination on 6 October 1981, his Vice-President and successor, Hosni Mubarak, declared another state of emergency, which he kept in place for the entire duration of his three decades in office.

President Mubarak argued in his Presidential Public Address in 1998 that the emergency law is required "in order to confront terrorism [and] protect democracy and stability." In practice, however, the law was used to not only control and contain terrorism, but to limit legitimate oppositional political activities. For example, campaign gatherings require prior permission from the Ministry of Interior under the emergency law. Thus, when a candidate plans to hold a public meeting, he must submit an application to the local police station stating details such as the date, location, and estimated size of the gathering. The application is then sent to the Ministry of Interior for consideration, and can be rejected.

The People's Assembly, which is usually characterized as the lower house of Egypt's quasi-bicameral legislature, is constitutionally empowered to question and even challenge presidential authority. However, that it chose not to do so cannot be attributed to the unanimous approval of presidential policies. In actuality, the People's Assembly was restricted to the role of rubber-stamping presidential authority because it is confined by presidential powers beyond its control. Under Article 152 of the 1971 Constitution, the president was able to have his proposals bypass the People's Assembly and have them endorsed directly through a referendum. Consequently, it is impossible for the Assembly to consider or reject the policy once approved in this manner.

The President of Egypt, however, rarely needed to resort to referendums except in circumstances where it is a formal requirement, such as initiating constitutional changes. Article 152 was seldom used because there was no reason to do so. The majority of legislation passed through the People's Assembly was initiated by the President, and almost all of the President's proposals were passed by the mandated two-thirds' majority with little to no deliberation at all. Academics and analysts observed that talk of democracy and liberal reforms from Egypt's leaders was spurred by a desire to garner internal and external legitimacy; however, these reforms lacked the substance needed to open the way for meaningful democratic change. Dr Augustus Richard Norton of Boston University wrote in 2005 that:

Certainly, the discovery of a democratic vocabulary does not stem from idealistic conversion, but from pragmatic conclusions about the need to relieve pressure and vent political steam, as well as the shrew recognition that democratization wins favour. ... The new language of politics in the Middle East, talks about participation, cultural authenticity, freedom and even democracy. No doubt, the defining flavor of the 1990s is participation.

Elections and apparent multi-party political systems offer authoritarian governments this opportunity for "democracy by decree." However, regimes that adopt these (electoral) systems, called competitive authoritarianism or illiberal democracy, "tend to impose a number of constraining conditions in order to ensure that the arena of the political contest remains under their stringent control. The laws regulating the licensing of opposition parties, for example, always demand a public commitment to the existing political order and the substantive acts of the regime." These were the conditions under which the National Democratic Party in Egypt were formed in 1978, lasting until its dissolution on 16 April 2011 by court order.

== History of the National Democratic Party ==
=== Gamal Abdel Nasser (1952–1970) ===
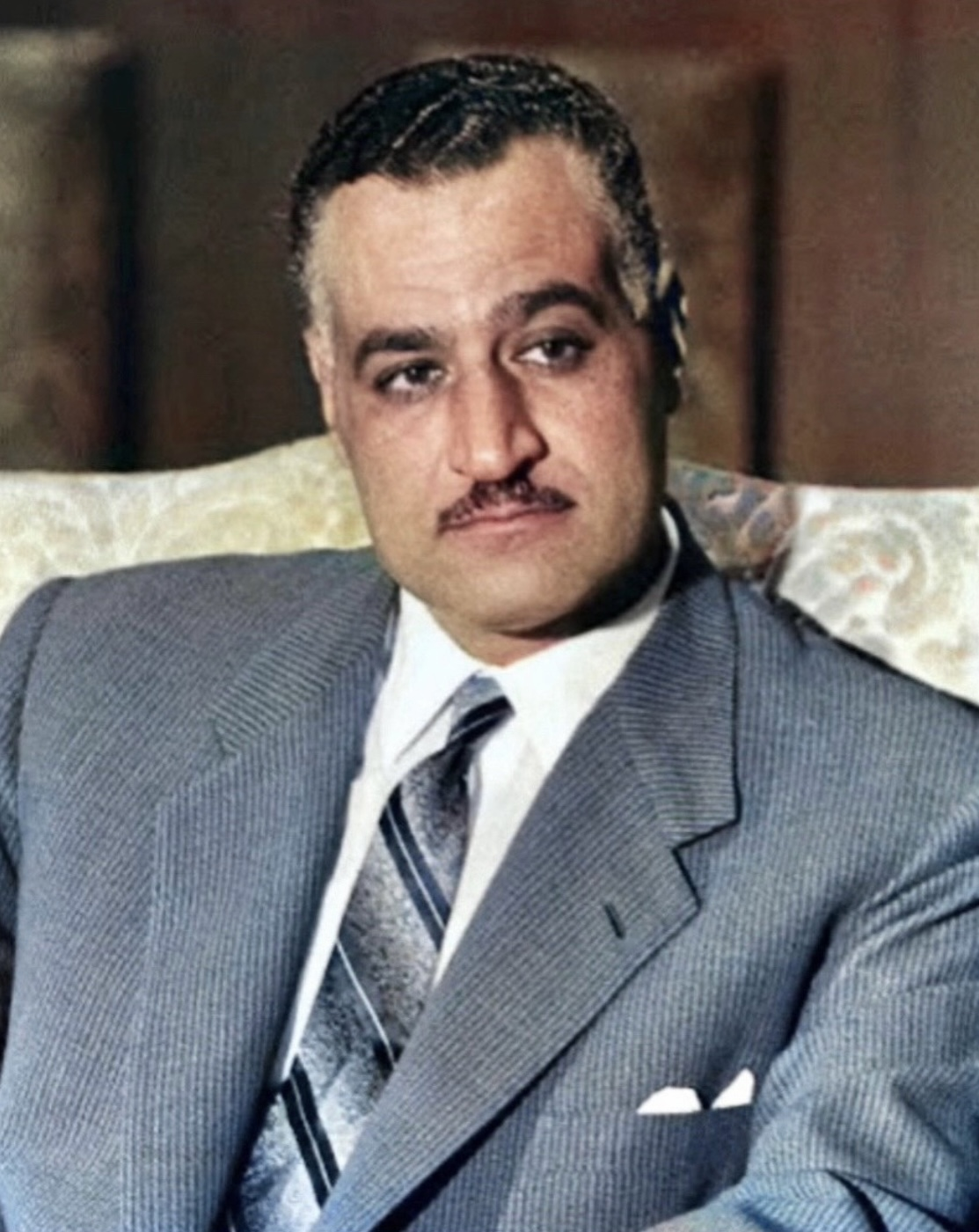
President Gamel Abdel Nasser

Prior to the introduction of a multi-party political system in Egypt, there was single-party rule (Although there was political party life before 1953 during the Kingdom of Egypt). Gamel Abdel Nasser rejected the idea of establishing alternative political parties at the establishment of the Republic of Egypt in 1953, instead opting to establish a single-party system in which interest groups were organized along functional lines and co-opted within the framework of an official representative body. This body was known as the Liberation Rally (LR) from 1952–1956, the National Union (NU) from 1956–1962, and the Arab Socialist Union (ASU) from 1962–1976. President Nasser's weariness of the multi-party system instituted by the colonial powers is rooted in his experience of British-dominated Egypt, where Britain manipulated the political parties and voting mechanisms to secure policies favourable to the British and the local Egyptian feudal system. As a result, revolutionary leaders were wary of continuing this system. President Nasser in 1957 said publicly:

Can I ask you a question: what is democracy? We were supposed to have a democratic system during the period 1923 to 1953. But what good was this democracy to our people? I will tell you. Landowners and Pasha... used this kind of democracy as an easy tool for the benefit of a feudal system... the peasants would cast their votes according to the instructions of their masters... I want to liberate the peasants and workers both socially and economically... I want the peasants and workers to say "yes" and "no" without any of this affecting their livelihood or their daily bread. This, in my view, is the basis of freedom and democracy.

The Liberation Rally was not intended to serve as a political party, although it functioned as a party for all intents and purposes. In fact, the Revolutionary Command Council (RCC), and in particular President Nasser, stressed the contrary. The new regime's perspective was to harness all leaders' energy and not dissipate it through parliamentary debates. The Liberation Rally's motto was "United, Order, and Work," intended to create a "popular base for the new regime, to mobilize and unite people around the new elite and confront and neutralize former politicians."

Liberation Rally was dissolved in 1956 and reorganized as the National Union party to accommodate President Nasser's growing pan-Arab rhetoric. This shift coincided with the establishment of a new constitution and with the union of Syria and Egypt in 1958, which formed the United Arab Republic (UAR). Between 1949 and 1955, Syria had witnessed five changes of leadership, and by the late summer of 1957, the country was on the verge of complete collapse. The communists were among the most organized political actors in Syria in the late 1950s, leading to increased fears of a communist takeover. To prevent this outcome, the Syrian Government under the Ba'ath Party requested full unification with Egypt. Nasser was reluctant to enter a rushed union, but given the severity of the concerns regarding the Syrian communists, agreed to the establishment of a federation between Egypt and Syria, with its capital in Cairo, administered by the same institutions that governed Egypt. The agreement to establish the United Arab Republic was made on 1 February 1958. The National Union party was designed and used by Nasser to include and co-opt Syrian political actors into the Egyptian state apparatus.

The Egyptian union with Syria unravelled on the morning of 28 September 1961, following a military coup. The coup leaders also expelled all Egyptians from the country. Nasser believed that one of the reasons why the UAR failed was because the degree of social reform necessary for such an ambitious project had not matriculated. Therefore, he increased the socialist nature of his government's policies. In 1962, Nasser disbanded the National Union and replaced it with the Arab Socialist Union to reflect this change in direction.

The names of these organizations – Liberation Rally, National Union, and the Arab Socialist Union – were significant. In each case, the word 'party' was scrupulously avoided, given its powerful connotations within Egypt of division and lack of national purpose. Therefore, the single party in Egypt was never conceived of as being an active institution with decision-making powers; rather, it was considered a civic association to mobilize the people. "Indeed, it was viewed more as a means of mobilizing political participation than as a vehicle for popular participation."

=== Anwar Sadat (1970–1981) ===
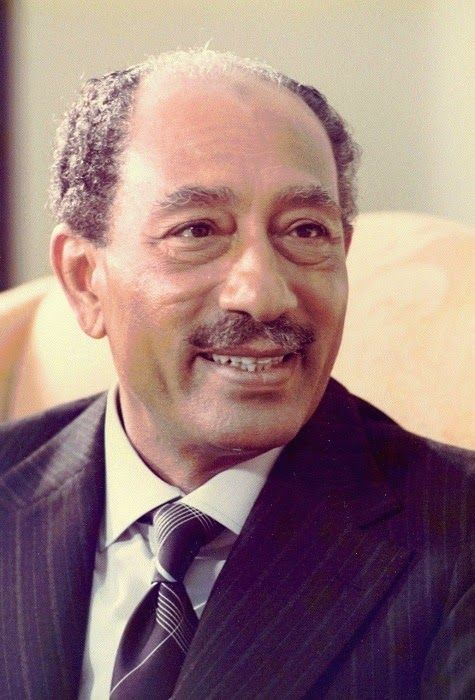
President Anwar Sadat

Gamel Nasser died while holding office in 1970, and his Vice-President and successor, President Anwar Sadat, began a four-phased approach to introducing a multi-party system: he issued the 1974 October Paper; he established manaber (platforms); he formed the Misr Party (EASP); and finally in 1978 he formed the National Democratic Party. In the October Paper, Sadat reaffirmed his commitment to establishing a constitutional democratic government, preserving Egypt's socialist character, and rejecting the "theory of the single party" and acknowledged calls for a multi-party system. The October Paper also announced Egypt's new economic policy as combining Arab capital, Western technology, and the state's abundant resources in an effort to transform the Egyptian economy. The new economic policy became known as al-Infitah al-Iqtisadi (the Economic Opening, or Open Door policy).

President Sadat's October Paper and political reform were motivated by self-preservation, not democratic idealism. Perceiving the Arab Socialist Union as a potential threat to his Presidency, Sadat divided the ASU into three ideological platforms. He then disbanded the ASU entirely in 1977 and endowed these bodies the official status of political parties in preparation for upcoming parliamentary elections. On 9 July 1978, Sadat announced the formation of his own political party drawing from the centre wing of the ASU, the National Democratic Party. It was formally approved on 2 October 1978. Soon thereafter, some 250 MPs of the People's Assembly hurried to join the President's new party. Dr. Maye Kassem of the American University in Cairo summarizes the transition from the ASU to the NDP thusly:

This move was undoubtedly related to the fact that the President's party would ensure for its members' direct access to state resources. The main point, however, is that since most of the NDP's members were originally members of the disbanded ASU, its creation was more the result of presidential instigation than of pressures from an organized constituency. Put differently, the mass conversion from "socialist" to "democratic" ideology implied not only the desire to remain under direct presidential patronage but also that the emergence of the ruling NDP was no more reflective of constituency interests than the ASU was under Nasser's party system.

The left wing of the ASU would become the National Progressive Unionist Party, while the right wing would become the Liberal Socialists Party. The Committee for the Affairs of Political Parties, commonly known as the Political Parties Committee (PPC), was created after the implementation of the multi-party system to both regulate party activities in addition to license new parties within the guidelines of Law 40. Law 40 empowered a committee chaired by the NDP – the speaker of the Shura Council – to suspend other parties' activities "in the national interest." It was composed of six regime-linked individuals: the minister of interior, the minister of justice, the state minister for the affairs of the People's Assembly, and three judicial figures appointed by the president's ministers. Since its creation in 1978, the NDP held no less than three-quarters of the seats in the People's Assembly. The ideology of the party remained purposefully vague and open to interpretation. As a result, the President and his government could pass any legislation without appearing to compromise the Party's "official" standing.

Opposition to Sadat increased from 1977 onward in the wake of his economic reforms and peace initiative with Israel. Sadat reacted with repression and open hostility toward the opposition. In response to the 1977 bread riots, Sadat said that people should "understand that democracy has its own teeth. The next time I'm going to be ten times as ruthless." In 1980 he declared Law 95, known as the Law of Shame, which criminalized many forms of expression. In September 1981, he arrested more than 1,000 of his critics from across the political spectrum. This crackdown is often cited in conjunction with Egypt's peace with Israel as a step leading to his assassination by Islamists on 6 October 1981.

=== NDP under Hosni Mubarak (1981–2011) ===
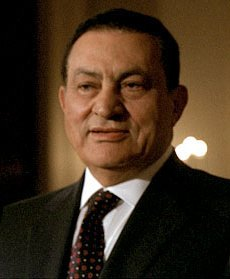
President Hosni Mubarak

After President Sadat's assassination in 1981, his successor Hosni Mubarak continued to request and obtain the People Assembly's approval to maintain the emergency law under the premise of threats of terrorism and violence. Despite the emergency law, political party life during the 1980s was relatively active, with the re-emergence of the Wafd Party, and the participation of the Muslim Brotherhood via alliances and Muslim Brotherhood candidates running as independents. Elections in 1984 and 1987 produced parliaments with opposition representation of about 20 percent. Unfortunately, the combination of increasing Islamist opposition groups and violence by extremist organizations during the 1990s spurred legislation that hurt all Egyptians' ability to express themselves politically via formal institutions or more informal means. The 1993 Syndicates Law, 1995 Press Law, and 1999 Nongovernmental Associations Law hampered freedoms of association and expression by imposing new regulations and draconian penalties on violations. As a result, by the late 1990s, parliamentary politics had become virtually irrelevant, and alternative avenues for political expression were curtailed as well.

The Political Parties Committee continued in form and purpose under Mubarak. Only two parties (the National Accord established in 2000 and the Democratic Front in 2007) were approved by the PPC under the Mubarak presidency. It was possible to appeal a PPC decision to the Higher Administrative Court for approval. Ten political parties under Mubarak succeeded in gaining legal status through this route. However, that only ten cases in a period of over twenty years have won such court cases indicates that the PPC was a major barrier to obtaining legal status as a political party in Egypt.

The National Democratic Party and parliamentary politics rebounded in insignificance in 2000 as a result of speculation among Egyptians about presidential succession. Mubarak was then 71 years old and had just begun his fourth six-year term in 1999. It appeared to many that Gamal Mubarak, President Hosni Mubarak's younger son, a banker by profession, was being groomed for the presidency. He began taking an increasingly active role in politics, first as a spokesman for business interests and youth as a nonpartisan activist and then later in the NDP.

President Mubarak announced parliamentary elections in 2000 and pledged to uphold a Supreme Constitutional Court ruling calling for judicial supervision of elections. Although the 2000 elections were the first to be supervised by judges, and by most accounts somewhat cleaner and more credible than the 1990 and 1995 elections, there were still widespread arrests of Muslim Brotherhood candidates and campaign workers, as well as intimidation of voters outside polling stations. Surprisingly, the NDP suffered an embarrassing defeat at the hands of independent candidates, who secured more than half of the 444 seats up for election versus the NDP's 39 percent. However, 181 of the independents were "NDP independents" – members who had run in the elections despite not having received the party's nomination. These 181 independents and an additional 35 actual independents joined the NDP after winning, giving the party a combined 88 percent parliamentary majority.

The poor performance of the NDP in the 2000 parliamentary elections afforded Gamal Mubarak an opportunity to assert himself in party politics. He proposed overhauling the NDP in an effort to make it look and function more like a modern political party rather than a tool for recruiting support for the regime in exchange for government patronage. Michele Dunne, editor of the Carnegie Endowment's Arab Reform Bulletin, wrote in 2006:

Drawing on largely the model of the British Labour Party, Gamal Mubarak designed and led a new Policy Secretariat that began to produce policy papers on a wide range of economic, political, and foreign affairs topics. He recruited a circle of young, reform-minded businesspeople and technocrats, some of whom were later placed in cabinet or party leadership positions. By 2004, Gamal Mubarak's imprint on the NDP was apparent, with the appointment of a cabinet full of his proteges (among them Prime Minister Ahmad Nazif) in July and the holding of a slickly package, media-friendly party conference in September showcasing the NDP's new image. Hosni Mubarak's presidential campaign in summer 2005 – which featured Western-style stumping, clear promises for policy changes, and an attempt to show that the party was not using government resources in the campaign – showed the touch of Gamal and his circle.

Gamal Mubarak also used the NDP annual conferences as an opportunity to woo established political elites of Egypt. One analyst wrote that the real story of the 19–21 September NDP conference of 2006 was not the carefully packaged briefings offered by party members but "Gamal Mubarak's increasing political weight and seemingly unstoppable ascent towards the presidency."

The re-imaging of the NDP had little effect on its mass appeal among Egyptians. Parliamentary elections of 2005 produced similarly disappointing results for the regime. NDP candidates won only 34 percent of the vote and again, it was only after co-opting "NDP Independents" and actual independents that the party was able to secure its two-thirds majority. Although opposition candidates only secured 28 percent of the People's Assembly, 2005 was a watershed moment for Egyptian politics, as opposition candidates were overwhelmingly elected from the Muslim Brotherhood rather than secular parties. The Muslim Brotherhood-affiliated candidates won a historic 88 seats in the legislature.

The Muslim Brotherhood was officially banned in Egypt but continued to run brotherhood-affiliated candidates as independents in local and parliamentary elections since 1984. Since its victory in 2005, the Muslim Brotherhood bloc used the People's Assembly in Egypt as a soapbox for criticizing the regime and as an engine for promoting its ideas. They also took their positions as MPs seriously, and through this effort, generated more legitimacy for the People's Assembly as an institution, as opposed to the 1990s when legislative politics were shallow and stagnant.

Despite speculation on Gamal Mubarak succeeding his father as president, Ali Eldin Hilal, the head of media for the NDP, said in an interview with the American Arab channel al-Hurra, "The candidate [in 2011] of the National Democratic Party will be President Mohammed Hosni Mubarak... This is the will of the leadership of the party." Hilal stated that the announcement would only be officially made a month or two before the elections in the autumn of 2011. President Mubarak would be 83 at the time of the election and 89 at the end of another six-year term.

=== 2010 parliamentary elections ===
2010 Parliamentary election results. the NDP won more than 3/4 of the People's Assembly's seats during that election.

The National Democratic Party of Egypt secured 420 of the 508 seats in the country's December 2010 elections for the lower house of parliament, the Majlis al-Shaab. The Muslim Brotherhood, which held roughly a fifth (88 seats) of parliament seats before the elections, won only one seat. Many human rights groups and NGOs decried the elections as fraudulent. The United States and the European Union also criticized the poll. The regime widely viewed the elections as a tightening of power in preparation for the following year's presidential elections.

In the first round of voting, the NDP won 209 of 211 seats. The Wafd Party won the other two seats, down from five in the prior parliament. After the near sweep of the first round of voting, both the Muslim Brotherhood and the Wafd Party withdrew from the second round of voting and boycotted them, citing fraud and voter intimidation. Egyptian rights groups called for the results to be annulled, and Amnesty International said that at least eight people had died in election-related violence.

=== Egyptian Revolution of 2011 ===
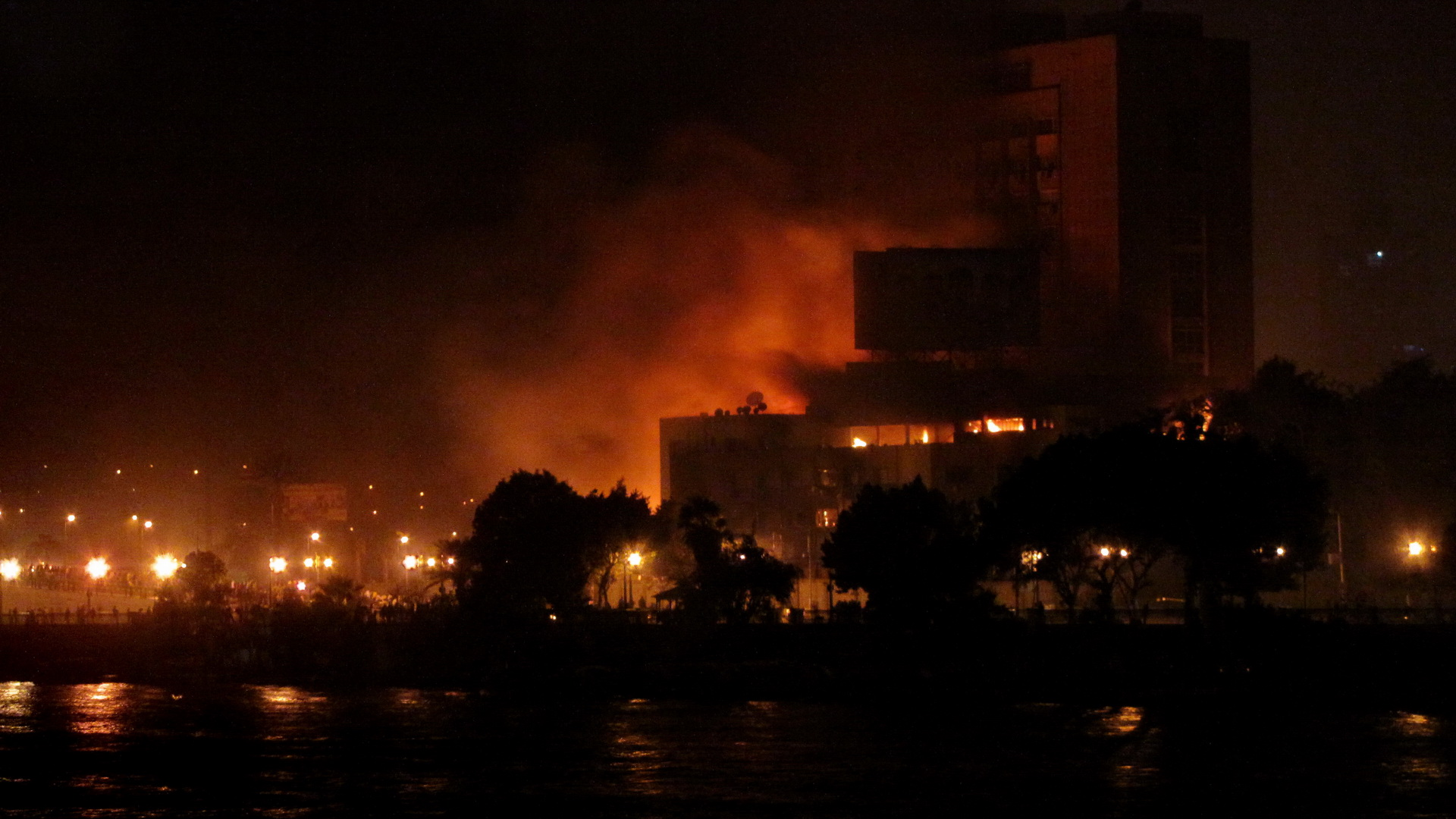
The main headquarters of the ruling National Democratic Party aflame during the Friday of Anger in Cairo

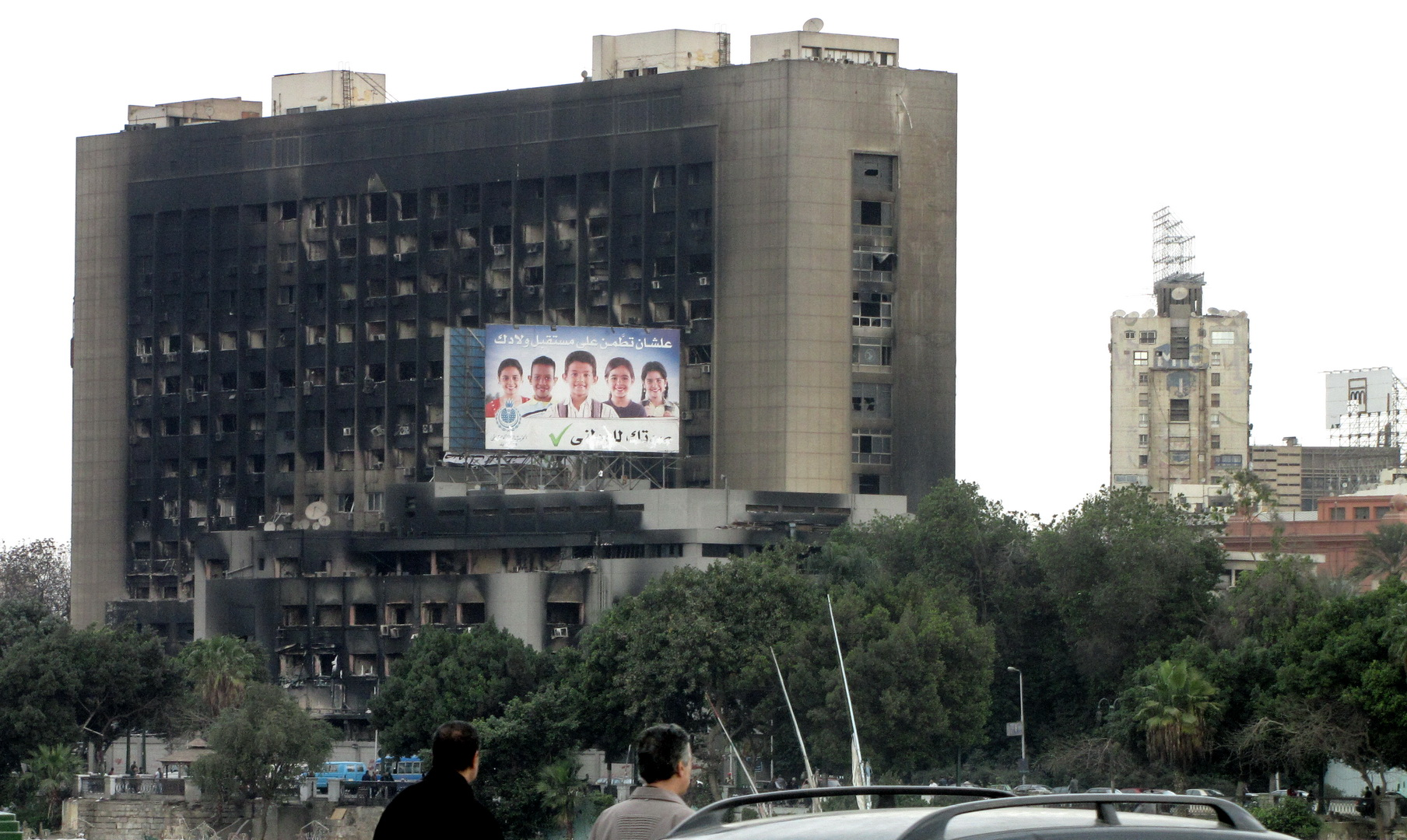
The NDP headquarters after the fire

Major protests erupted against the ruling government of Egypt on 25 January 2011 (alongside the wider Arab Spring), at the time dubbed the Day of Rage, led largely by the country's youth through social media websites such as Facebook and Twitter. Another day of rage was planned soon thereafter for Friday, 28 January. Traditional opposition, including the country's Muslim Brotherhood, asked their supporters to join in protest after Friday prayers. In preparation for potentially massive protests, the ruling party attempted to cut off internet and phone access (mobile and land-line).

Protests continued as planned, despite a government ban on demonstrations and an overnight curfew imposed. Tens of thousands of protesters took to the streets. During the protests, the NDP headquarters in Cairo was set ablaze and destroyed.

On 5 February, it was reported that Mubarak resigned as chairperson of the NDP, but it was later announced that "Al Arabiya television retracts its earlier report that Hosni Mubarak resigned"; however, his son Gamal and other top officials had resigned from its central committee. Hossam Badrawi, seen as a liberal, took over as secretary-general.

On 11 February, facing ever-increasing public opposition and strong hints of serious disquiet within the Egyptian military, Hosni Mubarak resigned as President of Egypt. On the same day, Hossam Badrawi resigned from his position as secretary-general and from the party less than a week after taking office.

=== Dissolution ===
Upon Hosni Mubarak's resignation, several NDP officials and members resigned following the filing of a number of lawsuits calling for the party's dissolution. On 12 April, in what was considered a surprise move, Talaat Sadat, nephew of former Egyptian President Anwar Sadat, who was not a party member and who had been long considered an opposition member, was selected as the new party chairman. Following his appointment, Sadat issued multiple statements declaring his intent on "cleaning" the party of its corrupt officials and party members and that the party name would be changed to the "New National Party" to reflect the party's new age. The party even declared that it would adopt the ideals and goals of the recent Egyptian revolution in its party platform.

However, on 16 April 2011, the NDP was dissolved by court order and its assets were ordered to be handed over to the government. In the parliamentary elections that followed the revolution, some former members established new parties, popularly termed felool or "remnants" of the old regime. Former members of the party founded the Coalition of the People's Representatives, which was going to run for seats in the next parliamentary election; the members of the coalition instead formed a party called the We Are the People Party. The Cairo Court for Urgent Matters banned former NDP members from taking part in elections on 6 May 2014, though a member of a committee that was revising parliamentary laws (named Mahmoud Fawzy) stated that the law only bans those who are convicted of tax evasion and political corruption. The ruling barring former NDP members from taking part in elections was overturned by the Cairo Court for Urgent Matters on 14 July 2014.

== Ideology ==
The ideology of the NDP was vague, with stated goals of both social justice and market reform. However, its ideological profile was often described as flexible and pragmatic, prioritizing regime stability and state control over a clearly defined doctrinal framework. The party emerged as a successor to the Arab Socialist Union (ASU), but departed from its predecessor’s emphasis on Arab socialism and Nasserism. Under President Anwar Sadat, the NDP adopted policies associated with economic liberalization, particularly through the Infitah ("open door") reforms, which sought to integrate Egypt into the global economy by encouraging foreign investment and private enterprise. Despite this shift, the state retained a central role in economic development, producing a hybrid system combining elements of state intervention and market-oriented reform.

Ideologically, the NDP functioned less as a programmatic political party and more as a mechanism for organizing political authority. Analysts have noted that Egyptian political parties in this period often operated as instruments of regime control rather than as representatives of distinct ideological constituencies. As a result, the NDP’s ideology remained intentionally broad, allowing it to incorporate diverse interests, including bureaucratic elites, business figures, and regional patronage networks.

The party’s policy framework emphasized economic modernization, social development, and integration into global markets. Official party documents highlighted priorities such as increasing competitiveness in international trade, attracting investment, and transitioning toward a knowledge-based economy. At the same time, the NDP promoted social policies aimed at mitigating inequality, including employment generation, subsidy systems, and initiatives for women's empowerment and participation in public life.

In foreign policy, the NDP linked domestic development goals with international engagement, emphasizing globalization, regional cooperation, and economic integration as essential components of national progress. Despite these stated positions, scholars frequently characterized the NDP as an instrument of authoritarianism, noting that its ideological flexibility enabled it to support a political system centered on presidential dominance, limited political competition, and extensive state oversight of political life. Its centrist positioning thus reflected a strategy of maintaining broad-based support while preserving the existing political order.

The party ceased to be even a left-of-centre social-democratic party shortly after its formation, drifting to the right and becoming a centrist "catch-all/big tent" party of power for members whose ideologies came from all over the political spectrum. Despite this and its increasingly authoritarian bent, the NDP was a member of the Socialist International up until 31 January 2011, when the embattled party was ousted and expelled from the group.

== Headquarters ==
The party's headquarters in Cairo was located in a prominent site between the Nile and Tahrir Square, behind the Egyptian Museum. The building was originally constructed in 1958 by architect Mahmoud Riad as part of a redevelopment of Cairo's riverfront skyline. Before becoming the headquarters of the National Democratic Party, it had served several other state and political functions, including housing Cairo's municipality and later the Arab Socialist Union.

During the Egyptian Revolution of 2011, the building was set on fire on 28 January 2011 and became one of the most visible symbols of the uprising. In the years that followed, its future became a matter of public debate, with some calling for its preservation as a reminder of the revolution and others supporting demolition. In 2015, the Egyptian government approved its demolition. The site was later intended for use by the adjacent Egyptian Museum, with proposals including a public garden and memorial space. As of the source's latest update, the plot remained vacant and fenced off from the public.

== Slogans ==
- "For You" من أجلك أنت
- "A new vision... for the future of our country" فكر الجديد... لمستقبل بلدنا

== Leadership ==
=== Leader ===
No.	Name (Birth–Death)	Term	
No.	Name (Birth–Death)	Took office	Left office
1	Anwar Sadat (1918–1981)	1978	1981
2	Hosni Mubarak (1928–2020)	1981	April 2011
3	Talaat Sadat (1954–2011)	12 April 2011	16 April 2011

=== Secretary-General ===
No.	Name (Birth–Death)	Term	
No.	Name (Birth–Death)	Took office	Left office
1	Fekry Makram Ebeid (1905–1992)	1978	1981
2	Hosni Mubarak (1928–2020)	1981	1982
3	Ahmad Fuad Mohieddin (1926–1984)	1982	1984
4	Yousef Wali (1930–2020)	1984	2002
5	Safwat El-Sherif (1933–2021)	2002	February 2011
6	Hossam Badrawi (born 1947)	February 2011	April 2011

== Electoral history ==
=== Presidential elections ===
Election	Party candidate	Votes	%	Result
1981 (referendum)	Hosni Mubarak	9,567,904	98.5%	Elected ✓
1987 (referendum)	Hosni Mubarak	12,086,627	97.1%	Elected ✓
1993 (referendum)	Hosni Mubarak	15,095,025	96.3%	Elected ✓
1999 (referendum)	Hosni Mubarak	17,554,856	93.8%	Elected ✓
2005	Hosni Mubarak	6,316,714	88.6%	Elected ✓

=== People's Assembly of Egypt elections ===
Election	Party leader	Votes	%	Seats	+/–	Position	Result
1979	Anwar Sadat		88.5%	347 / 392	▲347	▲1st	Supermajority government
1984	Ahmad Fuad Mohieddin	3,756,359	72.9%	390 / 458	▲43	1st	Supermajority government
1987	Atef Sedki	4,751,758	69.9%	346 / 458	▼44	1st	Supermajority government
1990	Atef Sedki		76.7%	348 / 454	▲2	1st	Supermajority government
1995	Kamal Ganzouri		70%	318 / 454	▼30	1st	Supermajority government
2000	Atef Ebeid		77.8%	353 / 454	▲35	1st	Supermajority government
2005	Ahmed Nazif		70%	311 / 454	▼42	1st	Supermajority government
2010	Ahmed Nazif		81%	420 / 518	▲109	1st	Supermajority government

=== Shura Council elections ===
Election	Seats	+/–	Position	Result
2007	84 / 88		1st	Governing supermajority
2010	80 / 132	▼4	1st	Governing majority
