= Prime Minister of Egypt =

Head of government

- رئيس مجلس الوزراء
- Seal of the Prime minister

- Flag of Egypt

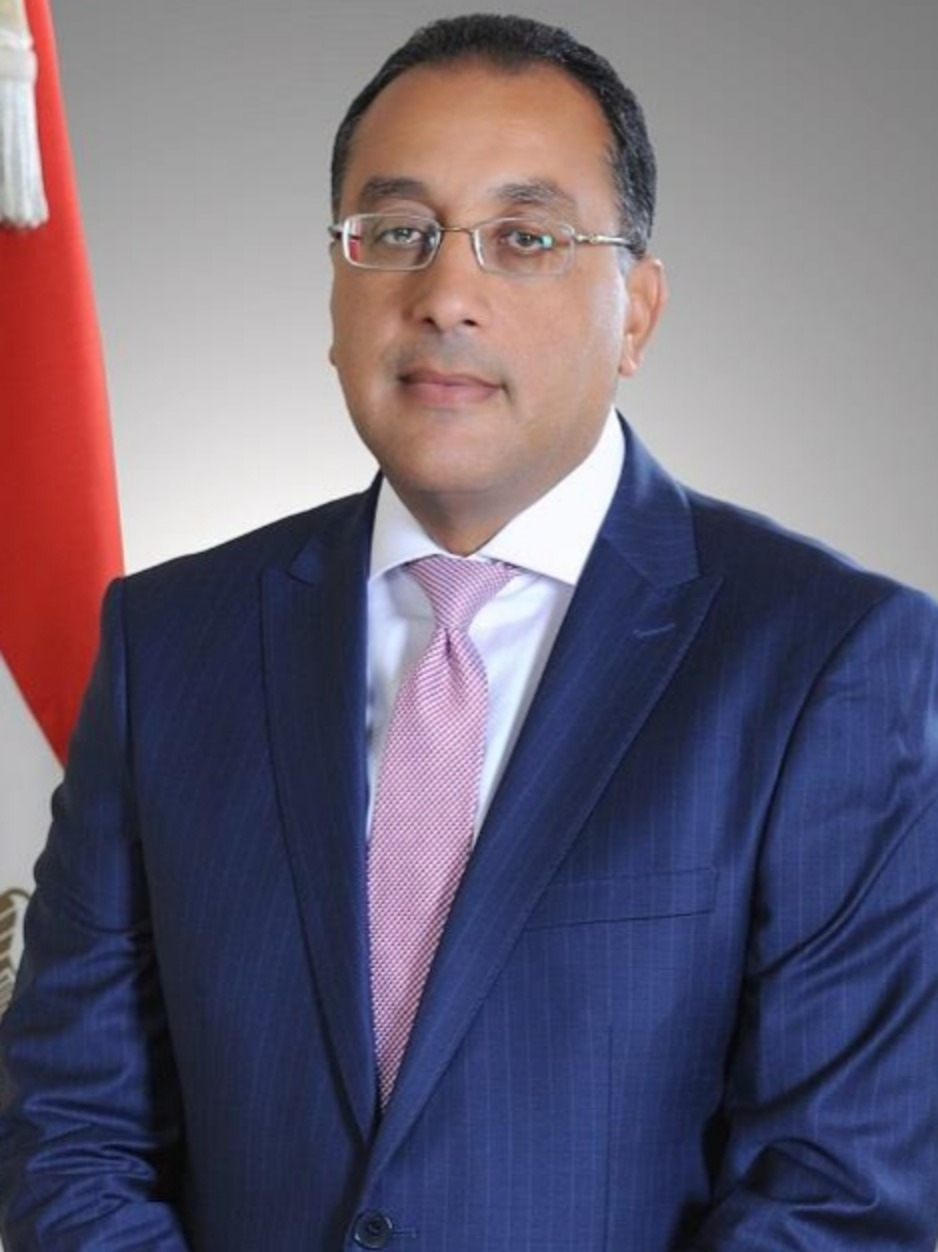
- Incumbent; Mostafa Madbouly since 7 June 2018
- Style: The Honourable
- Type: Head of government
- Appointer: President of Egypt
- Term length: No term limit
- Inaugural holder: Nubar Pasha
- Formation: 28 August 1878
- Website: www.cabinet.gov.eg

The prime minister of Egypt (Arabic: رئيس مجلس الوزراء, romanized: raʾīs majlis al-wuzarāʾ), sometimes referred to as "President of the Government" and Minister-President of Egypt, is the head of the Egyptian government. A direct translation of the Egyptian Arabic-language title is "President of the Council of Ministers".

The prime minister is the holder of the second-highest office in Egypt, after the president of Egypt. The president appoints the prime minister but cannot dismiss them, only request their resignation. The Government of Egypt, including the prime minister, can be dismissed by the House of Representatives. Upon appointment, the prime minister proposes a list of ministers to the president. Decrees and decisions signed by the prime minister, like almost all executive decisions, are subject to the oversight of the administrative court system. Ministers defend the programmes of their ministries to the prime minister, who makes budgetary choices.

== History ==
Egypt has a long history with a prime minister-type position existing in its governance. Under various Islamic Empires, Egypt had Viziers, a political office similar in authority and structure (in terms of being second in command to the Head of State) to that of a prime minister. During the Old, Middle, and New Kingdom phases of Ancient Egypt, it was common practice for the Pharaoh to appoint a second in command officer whose position is translated to as Vizier. This pattern of having a prime minister/vizier position in government was only broken for an extended period of time during Roman and Sassanid governance of Egypt, in which Egypt was directly ruled by appointed Governors. Then with the founding of modern Egypt and the advent of the Muhammad Ali dynasty, premiership and cabinets in their current definitions started appearing in Egypt parallel to the country's first modern constitutions and parliaments. The office of Prime Minister of Egypt was established in 1878 during the reign of Khedive Ismail, along with the Cabinet of Egypt. After the abolition of the monarchy in 1953, the Egyptian government maintained the position of prime-minister.

In the late 1970s, Egypt had several cohabitation governments which proved to be unstable, due to the struggle arising between the president and the prime minister. From 1981 until 2011, the National Democratic Party had maintained a majority in the People's Assembly and supplied the Egyptian president. The National Democratic Party was dissolved by the supreme administrative court on 16 April 2011, following the Egyptian uprising which eventually caused the resignation of Hosni Mubarak.

== Powers ==
Previously, under the 1971 Constitution as amended in 1980, 2003 and 2007, the role of the Prime Minister was limited only to supervising the Cabinet, as the President at that time, was both the head of state and of the government.

The prime minister, now, heads the Cabinet, and the entire government of the country under the 2012 and the present 2014 Constitutions, aside from supervising and directing its activities and overseeing its work. The prime minister, alongside the members of the Cabinet, may propose laws to bicameral Parliament, the senate and the House of Representatives, as well as amendments during parliamentary meetings. The prime minister has also the power to issue regulations enforcing the laws as well as ensuring full public services and disciplinary measures, which must be subject to government approval.

The said regulatory powers were previously held by the president under the 1971 Constitution, as amended in 1980, 2003 and 2007.

The prime minister and the Cabinet also helps the president in formulating the state's general policy and in overseeing its implementation under both the 2012 and the present 2014 Constitutions.

Nubar Pasha was a Christian Egyptian-Armenian politician and the first Prime Minister of Egypt. He served as Prime Minister three times during his career. His first term was between August 1878 and 23 February 1879

When parties from opposite ends of the political spectrum control Parliament and the presidency, the power-sharing arrangement is known as cohabitation. Several cohabitation governments took control in the 1970s yet proved to be very unstable.

== Current Prime Minister ==
From 1 March to 17 June 2014, Ibrahim Mahlab served as the Acting Prime Minister of Egypt. At the time of his appointment by Adly Mansour, he said, "security and stability in the entire country and crushing terrorism will pave the way for investment."

A new cabinet was formed on 19 September 2015.

Egyptian President Abdel-Fattah El-Sisi accepted the resignation of the government and asked Petroleum Minister Sherif Ismail to form a new cabinet.

In June 2018, Ismail submitted his letter of resignation to Sisi. Soon afterwards, Sisi appointed Housing Minister Mostafa Madbouly as acting prime minister.

== See also ==
- Cabinet of Egypt
- Politics of Egypt
- President of Egypt
- List of political parties in Egypt
- List of prime ministers of Egypt
