= Mashhour Ahmed Mashhour =

ORE Mashhour Ahmed Mashhour
- Born: April 1, 1918; Egypt
- Died: July 6, 2008 (aged 90); Cairo, Egypt
- Education: Cairo University
- Occupation: Engineer

Mashhour Ahmed Mashhour (Arabic: مشهور أحمد مشهور, April 1, 1918 – July 6, 2008) was an Egyptian Engineer, he was the Chairman of the Suez Canal Authority (October 1965 – December 1983).

== Early life and education ==
Mashhour was born in April 1918 in Al-Saadieen Village in Sharqia Governorate, Egypt, for a big family of many siblings, one of his brothers is Abdel hay Mashhour. His father Ahmed Mashhour was the mayor of Al saadeyeen village and his mother Zuhra Zada was a housewife.

He graduated from the Faculty of Engineering, Fouad I University (now known as Cairo University) in 1942.

== Career ==
Following graduation Mashhour joined the Army Corps of Engineers in 1943 and graduated as a military officer engineer. He became a member of the Free Officers group and played a role in the Egyptian revolution of 1952. He was among the group assigned by the Egyptian President Gamal Abdel Nasser for the nationalization of the Suez Canal, headed by Mahmoud Younis in 1956. After the nationalization of the Suez Canal in 1956, he was assigned the director of the movements in the Suez Canal Authority, then took over the chairmanship of the Suez Canal in October 1965.

=== The Chairman of Suez Canal Authority ===
He was Chairman of Suez Canal Authority from 14 October 1965 until 31 December 1983.

Mashhour was one of the most significant chairmen of the Suez Canal, as he has witnessed very critical periods of Suez Canal history, the thing that made some call him "The man of the difficult missions". Some of the major events that he witnessed as the Chairman of Suez Canal include:

the re-opening of the Suez Canal on 5 June 1975, after it has been closed upon the 1967 Arab-Israeli war and in 1973, during the war, the canal was the scene of a major crossing by the Egyptian army into Israeli-occupied Sinai, and much wreckage from this conflict remained along the canal's edges. Besides being the Chairman of the Suez Canal Authority, he participated in the social life in Ismailia governorate to be elected a member of the Egyptian parliament for the province of Ismailia in 1976 until 1979 and secretary of the National Democratic Party during the same period. He had occupied different positions including The President of the Arab Society for Mining and Petroleum, a member of the board of Egypt-Iran Bank and a member of the National Council for Production.

He became deputy prime minister in 1980.

== Honors ==
Mashhour was granted a lot of medals and accolades throughout his life.

- He was granted the Order of the Nile (Kiladate El Nile) by the president Anwar Sadat, which is Egypt's highest state honor, granted to the heads of state and those who rendered great services on the national or human level.
- The Republic Military Decoration, first Class.
- The Order of Merit, first Class.
- The Order of the Republic, first Class.
- The Order of Liberation.
- The Medal of Palestine.
- The medal of the Republic, third degree, and lots more.

He was also granted a number of accolades from different countries worldwide, including:

- The National Order of the Legion of Honour or Ordre national de la Légion d'honneur, France
- The Order of Renaissance, Poland
- The Order of Mono, Grand officer, the Togolese Republic
- He received an Honorary Doctorate from Minufiya University in 1982.

== Personal life ==
He was married to Aziza Salem Mashhour, and they had four children and ten grandchildren.

== Death and legacy ==
On 6 July 2008 he died in Cairo, Egypt at the age of 91, and a solemn military funeral was held and led by Ahmed Nazif, the Egyptian Prime Minister who attended on behalf of President Mubarak.

A dredger named after Mashhour was involved in the freeing of the ship involved in the 2021 Suez Canal obstruction.
