= Muhammad Naji Al-Mahlawi =

Mohamed Nagy El Mahlawy (May 6, 1917 – August 25, 1978) was an Egyptian nephrologist and the former president of Ain Shams University. He was the first to introduce kidney dialysis in Egypt and the Middle East and holds Order of the Republic (Egypt), First Class and the Order of Merit, Third Class and Fourth Class.

== Early ==
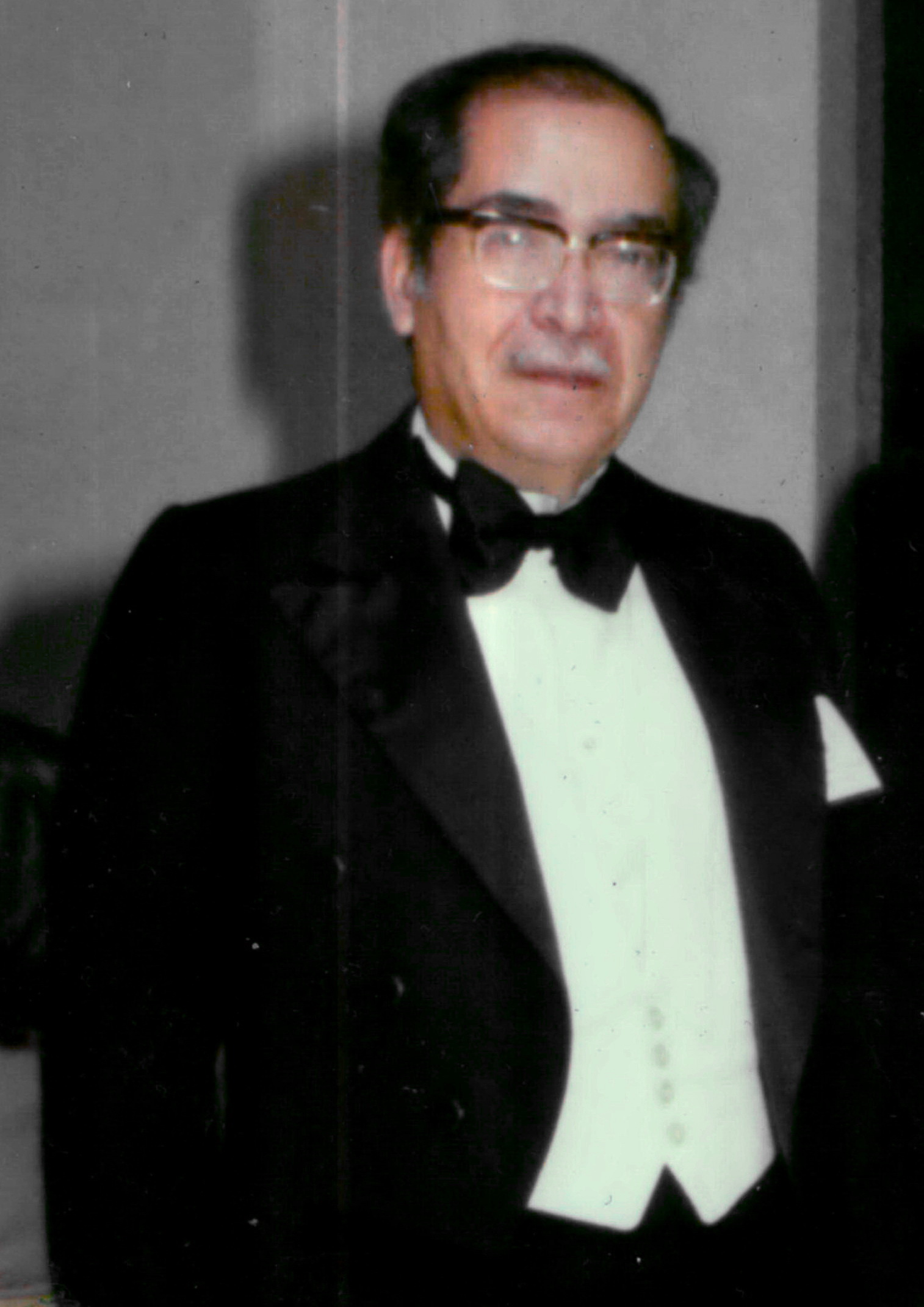
Professor Dr. Mohamed Nagy El Mahlawy

Al-Mahlawi was born on May 6, 1917, in Cairo. His father was Sheikh Muhammad al-Mahlawi, one of the senior scholars of Al-Azhar (who held the international rank of Al-Azhar) and a member of the first body of senior scholars of Al-Azhar during the reign of Khedive Abbas Hilmi II. His mother is Ruqayya Nasr Al-Adli, daughter of Sheikh Nasr Al-Adli, head of the proofreaders at Bulaq Press.

== Education and academic career ==
Al-Mahlawi graduated from the Faculty of Medicine at Cairo University in 1940, then worked as a resident physician for internal medicine, then a teaching assistant at the Faculty of Medicine, Cairo University in 1945. He worked as a teacher of internal medicine at Kasr Al-Aini Medicine from February 1947, and was assigned to teach at the Ain Shams Faculty of Medicine in 1948. In March 1950, Al-Mahlawi was transferred as a lecturer at the Faculty of Medicine at Ain Shams University, then he was appointed as an assistant professor in January 1951, then as a professor for the chair of internal medicine in December 1959. He was appointed as a full-time professor at the Faculty of Medicine at Ain Shams University from retirement age in May 1977 until his death.

=== Positions ===
Al-Mahlawy was appointed Vice Dean of the Faculty of Medicine for Postgraduate Studies in September 1965, then its Dean in July 1967. Then he was appointed Vice Dean of Ain Shams University for Postgraduate Studies and Research in September 1969, and the appointment was renewed in September 1973. Then he was appointed President of Ain Shams University from May 1974 until he reached retirement age in May 1977.

=== Achievements ===
He was the first to introduce hemodialysis (referred to at the time as an "artificial kidney") in Egypt and the Middle East and holds the Order of the Republic, He established the Artificial Kidney Department at the Faculty of Medicine, Ain Shams University, and contributed to its development later.

== Honors and medals ==
- Order of the Republic (Egypt), First Class
- Order of Merit, Third Class (1960).
- Order of Merit, fourth class
- His name was published in the Directory of Nephrologists issued in 1966 by the International Society of Nephrology in Basel, Switzerland, as one of the ten most famous nephrologists in Africa.
- His name was given to the Artificial Kidney Department at Ain Shams University Hospitals after his death in 1978.
- His name was published by the International Biographical Center in Cambridge, England, in the International Dictionary of Biography, sixteenth edition of 1979.
- Ain Shams Faculty of Medicine established an award in his name that is awarded annually to the first bachelor's student in the subject of general internal medicine. The Medical Syndicate honored him on Doctor's Day (March 18) as one of the pioneers of medicine in Egypt, after his death.
- The Egyptian Society of Nephrology honored its founder El Mahlawy after his death in 1999 at the 18th Congress of the Society.
- Ain Shams University honored him in 2000 on the occasion of the university's golden jubilee, after his death.

== Professional memberships ==
- Member of the Board of Directors of the Egyptian Medical Association President of the Egyptian Society of Nephrology
- Member of the International Society of Nephrology
- Member of the Egyptian Society of Cardiology
- Member of the Association of African Medical Colleges
- Member of the American Medical Association in Vienna
- Member of the Clinical Society of Kasr Al-Aini Medicine
- Member of the Clinical Society of Ain Shams Medicine
- Member of Institut d'Égypte
- Member of the Technical Secretariat of the Supreme Council for Science since its establishment
- Member of the technical body of the Supreme Council of Universities since its establishment
- Member of the Science and Technology Committee of the National Division of UNESCO
- Member of the National Council for Education and Scientific Research
- Member of the Association of African Medical Colleges

== Dr. Muhammad Naji Al-Mahlawi Award ==
After El Mahlawy's death on August 25, 1978, Imad Salem (Secretary General of Suez Canal University) gave an amount of 800 pounds as a gift to the Faculty of Medicine of Ain Shams in the name of Professor Dr. Mohamed Nagy El Mahlawy. It was allocated to outstanding students, so the Faculty of Medicine at Ain Shams University purchased investment certificates, the return of which was distributed every year to a student. The first bachelor's degree was in general internal medicine, and then the Mahlawi family continued to increase the value of the certificates until it reached ten thousand pounds. This award has been running since 1978 until now.

== Death ==
Muhammad Naji Al-Mahlawi died on the morning of Friday, August 25, 1978, AD, corresponding to Ramadan 21, 1398 AH, as a result of a Intracerebral hemorrhage.

== Gallery ==
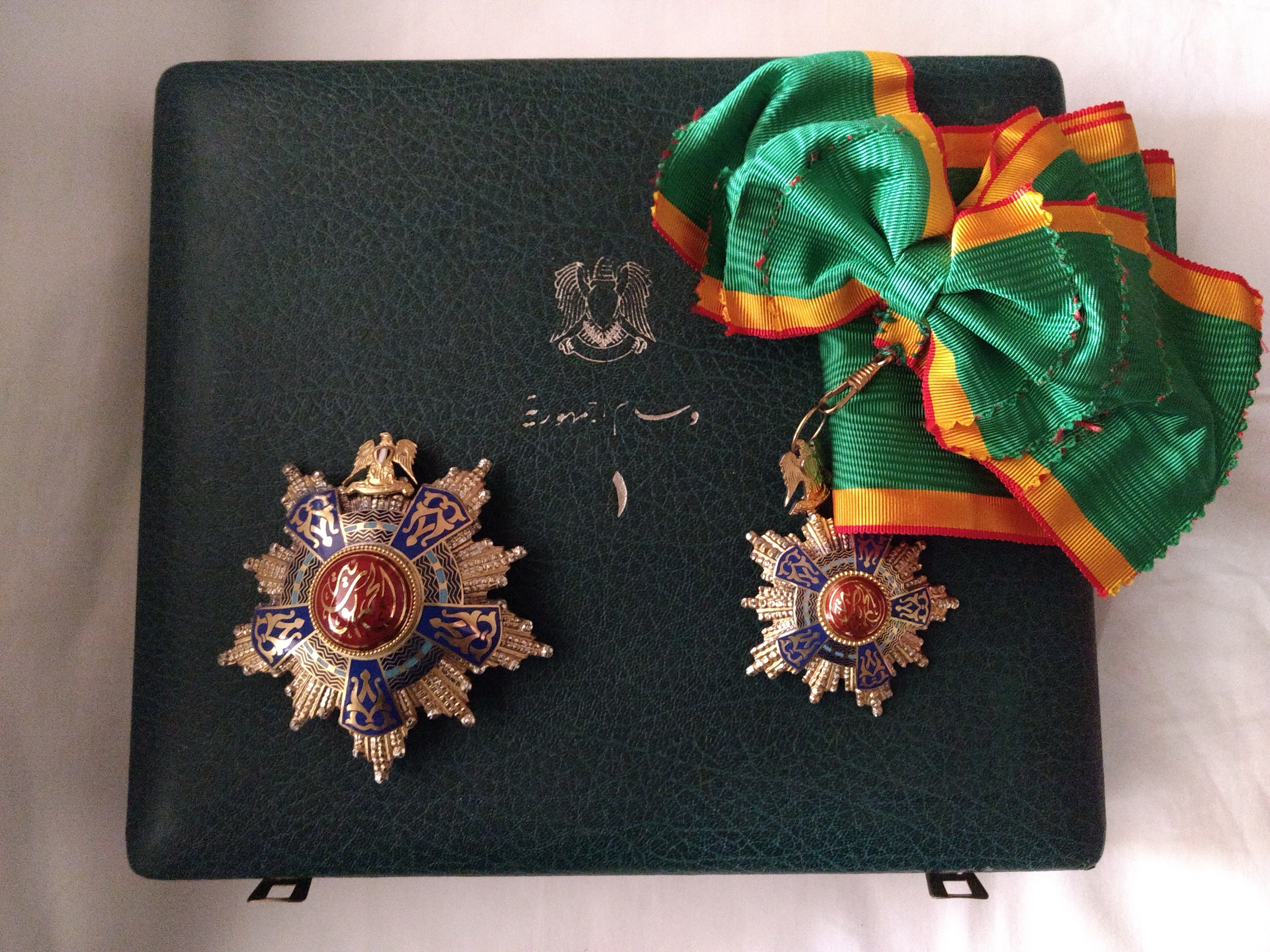

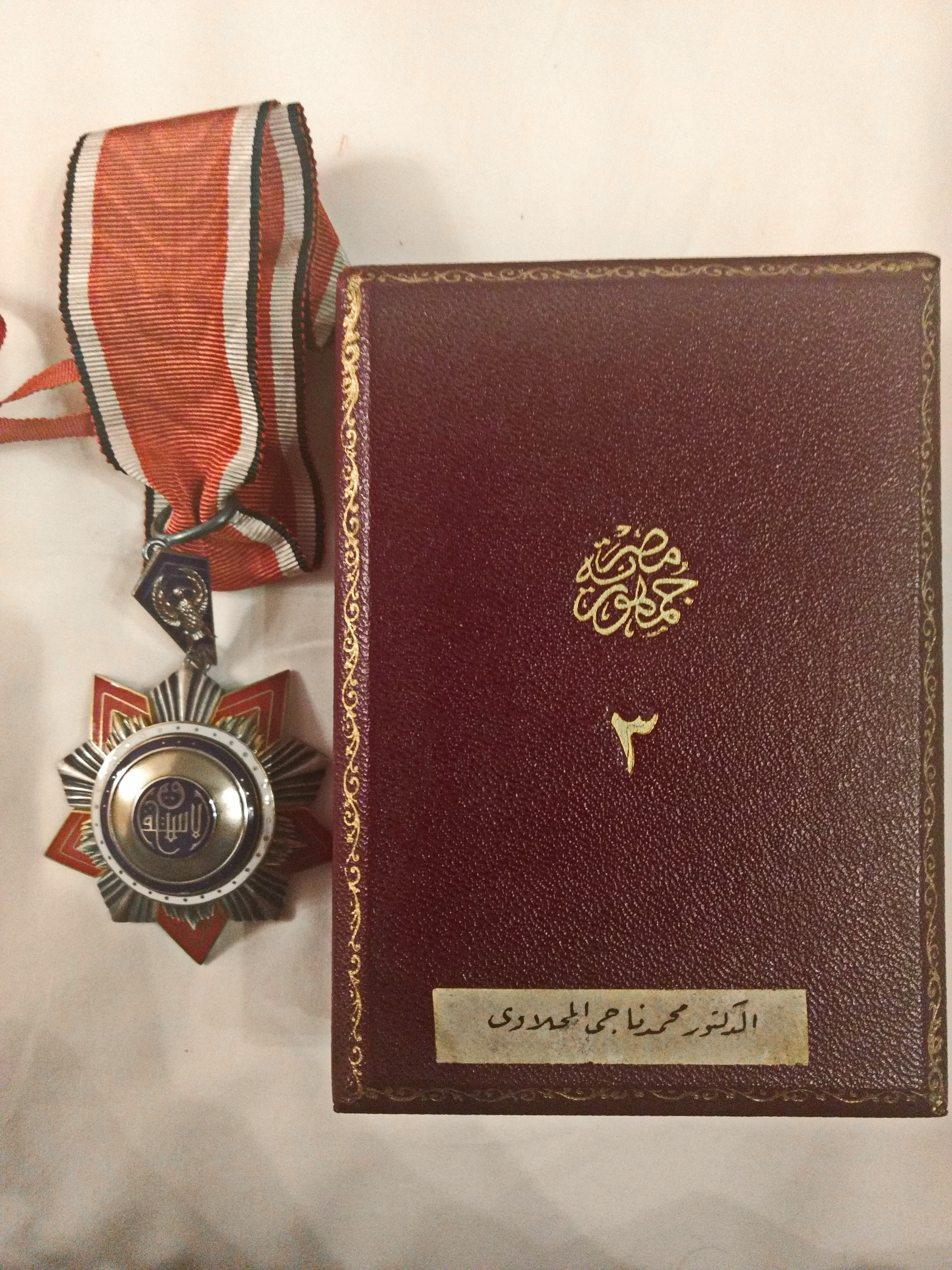

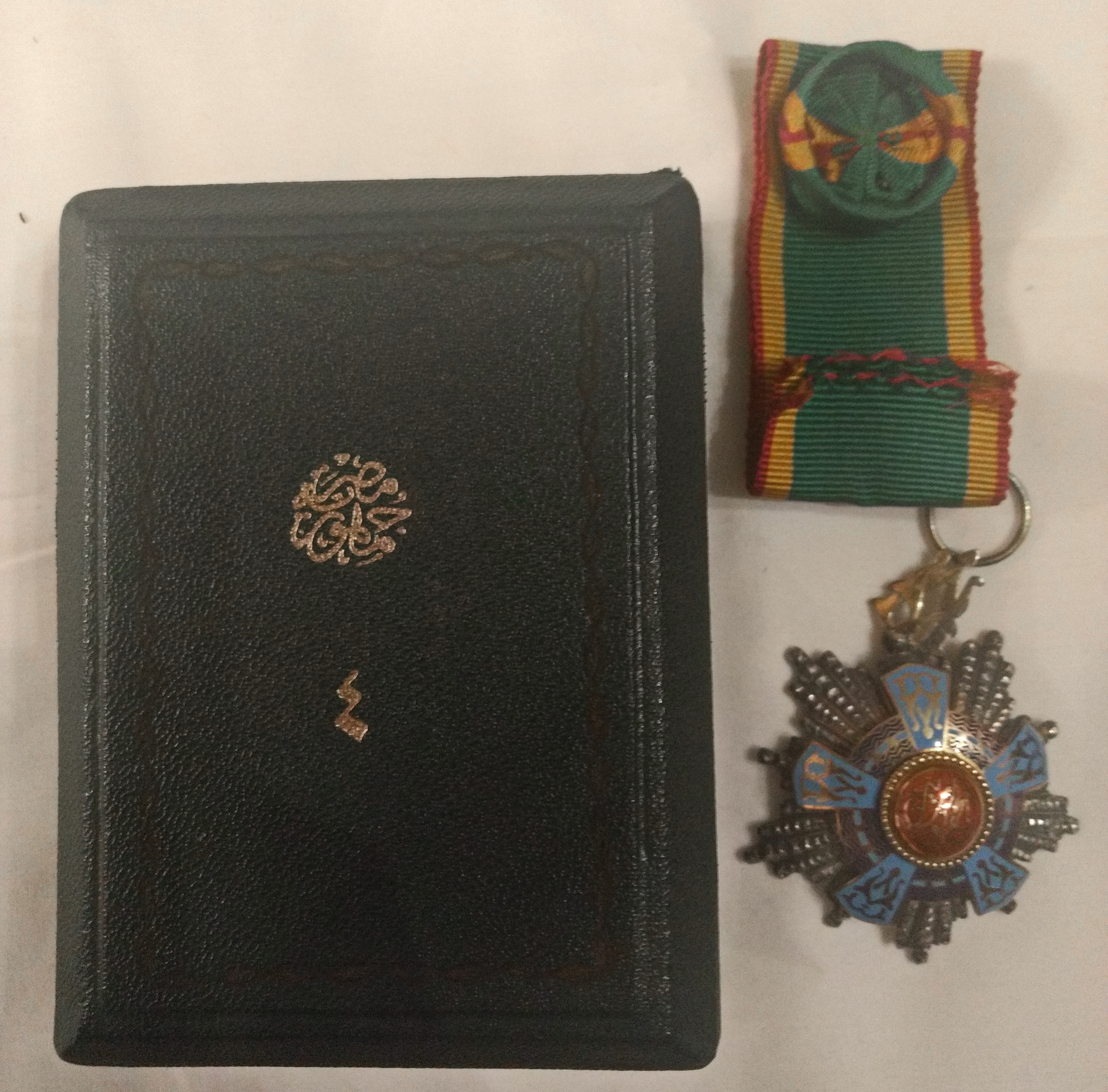

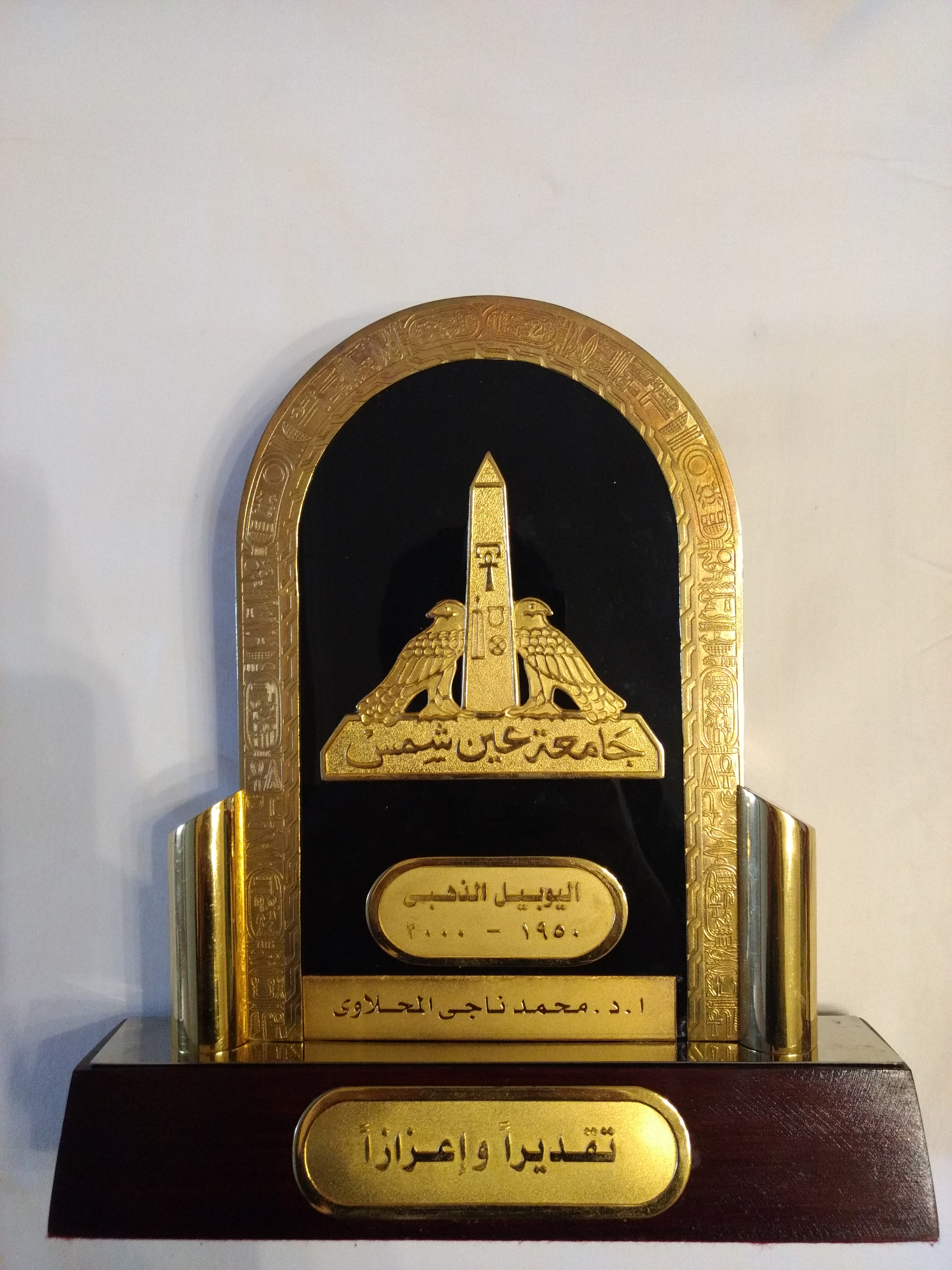

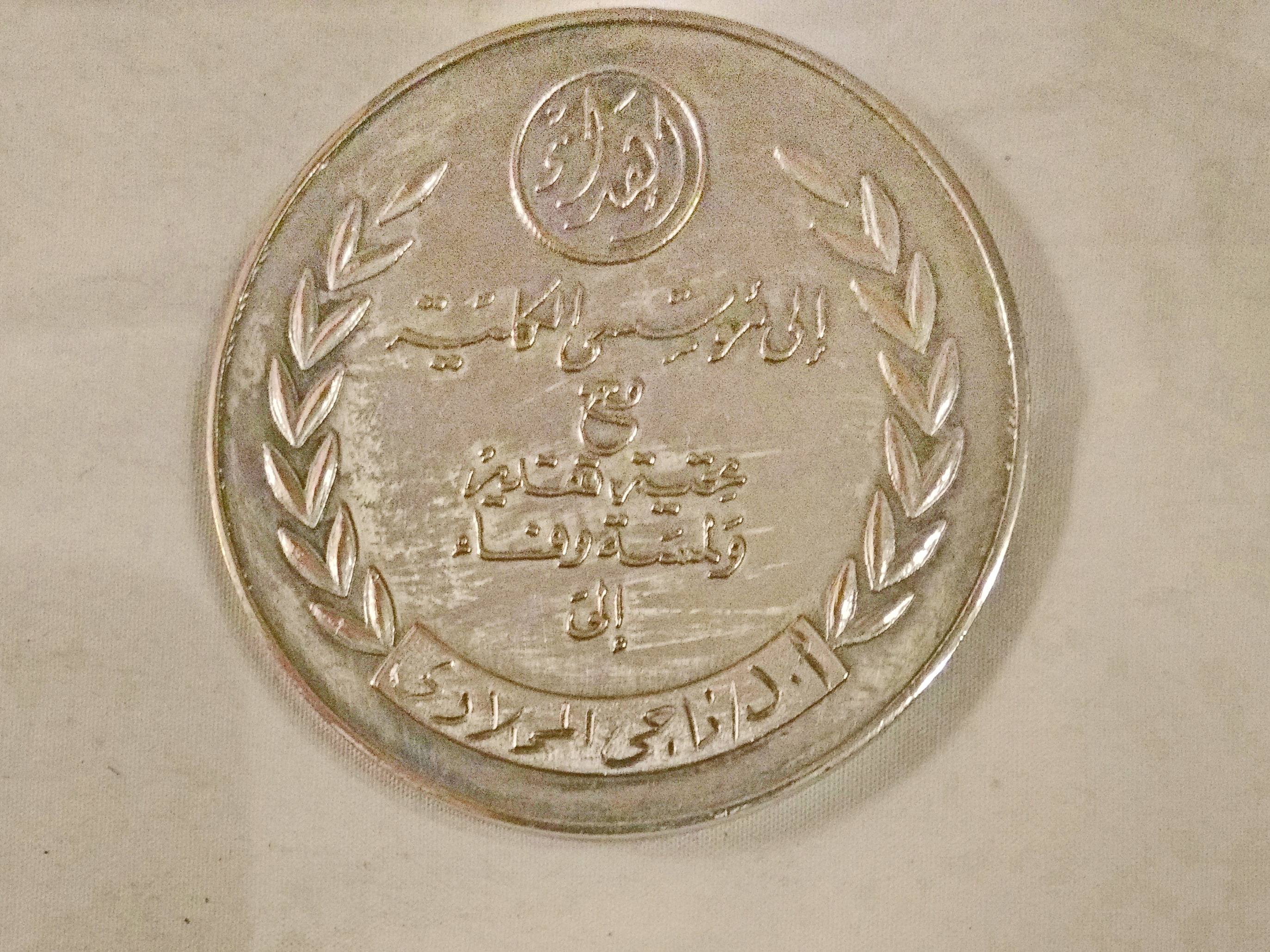

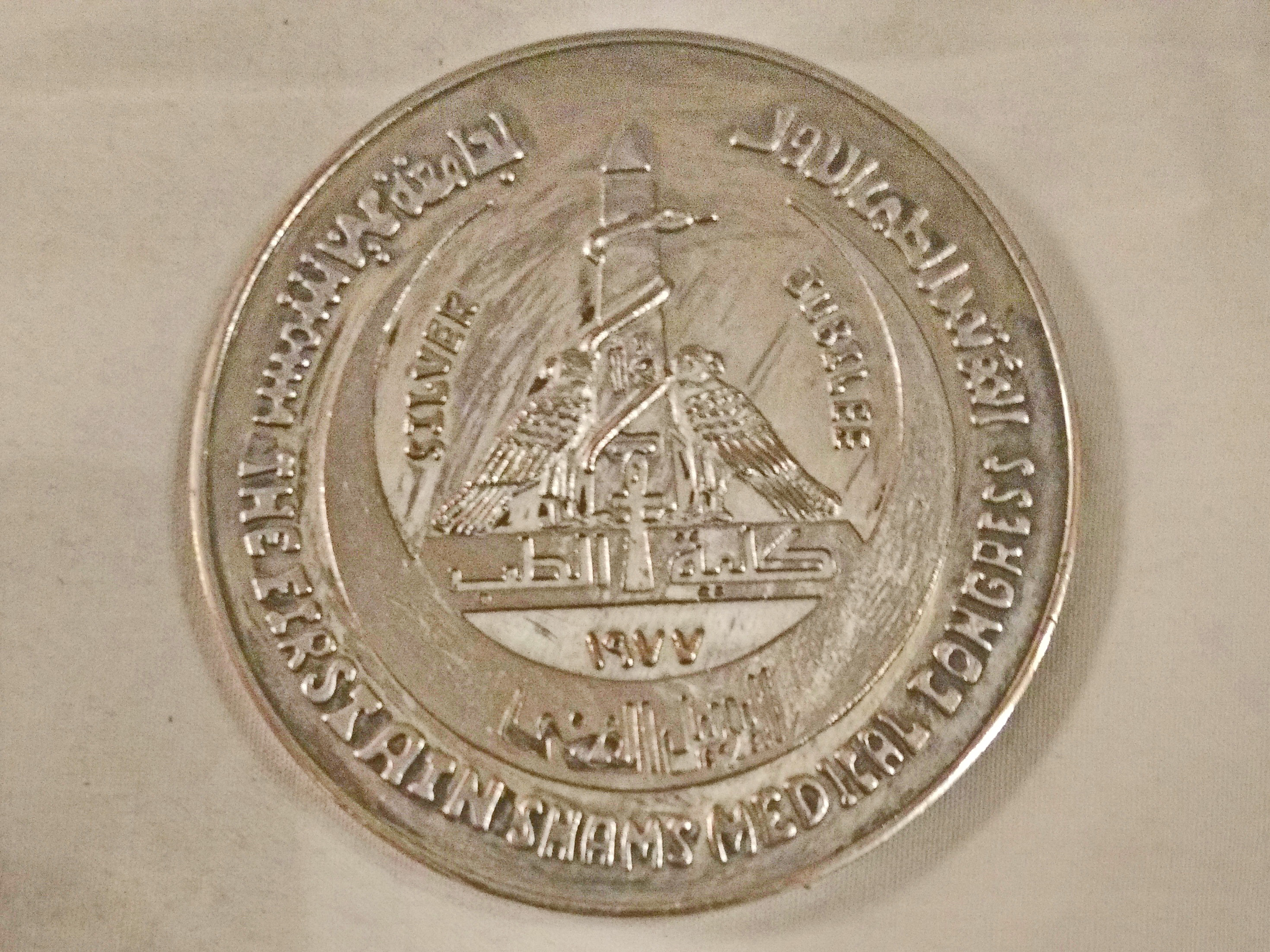

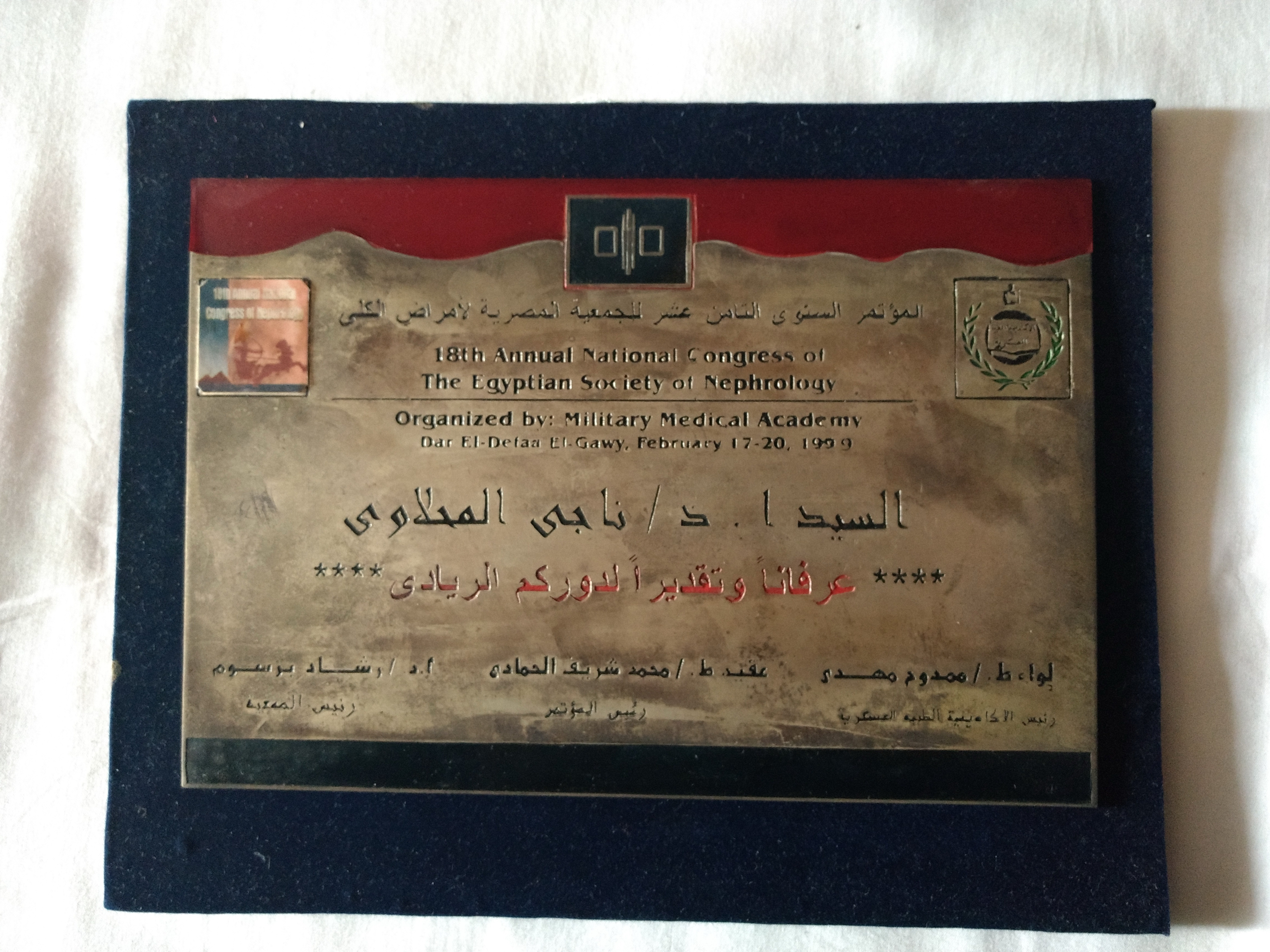

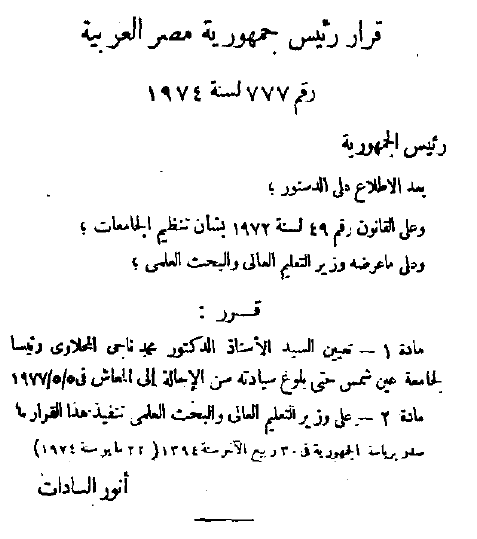
