= Hosni Mubarak =

President of Egypt from 1981 to 2011

His Excellency Hosni Mubarak
- حسني مبارك
- Official portrait, 1985

4th President of Egypt
- In office 14 October 1981 – 11 February 2011
- Prime Minister: See list: Himself; Ahmad Fuad Mohieddin; Kamal Hassan Ali; Aly Lotfy Mahmoud; Atef Sedky; Kamal Ganzouri; Atef Ebeid; Ahmed Nazif; Ahmed Shafik
- Vice President: Vacant (1981–2011); Omar Suleiman (Jan–Feb 2011)
- Preceded by: Anwar Sadat; Sufi Abu Taleb (acting)
- Succeeded by: Mohamed Morsi^{[a]}

41st Prime Minister of Egypt
- In office 6 October 1981 – 2 January 1982
- President: Sufi Abu Taleb (acting); Himself
- Preceded by: Anwar Sadat
- Succeeded by: Ahmad Fuad Mohieddin

7th Vice President of Egypt
- In office 16 April 1975 – 14 October 1981
- President: Anwar Sadat; Sufi Abu Dhabi (acting)
- Preceded by: Hussein el-Shafei; Mahmoud Fawzi
- Succeeded by: Omar Suleiman^{[b]}

24th Secretary-General of the Non-Aligned Movement
- In office 16 July 2009 – 11 February 2011
- Preceded by: Raúl Castro
- Succeeded by: Mohamed Hussein Tantawi

4th Commander of the Air Force
- In office 23 April 1972 – 16 April 1975
- President: Anwar Sadat
- Preceded by: Ali Mustafa Baghdady
- Succeeded by: Mahmoud Shaker

5th Director of the Egyptian Air Academy
- In office November 1967 – June 1969
- Preceded by: Yahia Saleh Al-Aidaros
- Succeeded by: Mahmoud Shaker

Personal details
- Born: Muhammad Hosni El Sayed Mubarak; 4 May 1928 Kafr-El Meselha, Egypt
- Died: 25 February 2020 (aged 91) Cairo, Egypt
- Party: NDP (1978–2011); ASU (before 1978)
- Spouse: Suzanne Thabet (m. 1959)
- Children: Alaa; Gamal
- Education: Egyptian Military Academy; Egyptian Air Academy; Frunze Military Academy

Military service
- Branch/service: Egyptian Air Force
- Years of service: 1950–1975
- Rank: Air chief marshal^{[c]}
- Commands: Egyptian Air Force; Egyptian Air Academy; Beni Suef Air Base; Cairo West Air Base
- 1. As chairman of the Supreme Council of the Armed Forces, Muhammad Hussein Tantawy served as interim president between the end of Mubarak's term and Morsi's assumption of office.; 2. Office vacant from 14 October 1981 to 29 January 2011; 3. Military rank withdrawn after trial

Muhammad Hosni El Sayed Mubarak (Note: Arabic: محمد حسني السيد مبارك, romanized: Muḥammad Ḥusnī as-Sayyid Mubārak, Egyptian Arabic: [mæˈħæmmæd ˈħosni (ʔe)sˈsæjjed moˈbɑːɾɑk]) (4 May 1928 – 25 February 2020) was an Egyptian politician and military officer who served as the fourth president of Egypt from 1981 until his resignation in 2011, following the Egyptian revolution. He was previously the seventh vice president under President Anwar Sadat from 1975 until his accession to the presidency, and the 41st prime minister from 1981 to 1982. Before he entered politics, Mubarak was a career officer in the Egyptian Air Force. He served as its commander from 1972 to 1975 and rose to the rank of air chief marshal in 1973.

After Sadat was assassinated in 1981, Mubarak assumed the presidency in a single-candidate referendum, and renewed his term through single-candidate referendums in 1987, 1993, and 1999. Under United States pressure, Mubarak held the country's first multi-party election in 2005, which he won. In 1989, he succeeded in reinstating Egypt's membership in the Arab League, which had been frozen since the Camp David Accords with Israel, and in returning the Arab League's headquarters back to Cairo. He was known for his supportive stance on the Israeli–Palestinian peace process, in addition to his role in the Gulf War. Despite providing stability and reasons for economic growth, his rule was repressive. The state of emergency, which had not been lifted since the 1967 war, stifled political opposition, the security services became known for their brutality, and corruption became widespread.

Mubarak stepped down during the 2011 Egyptian revolution after 18 days of demonstrations, transferring power to the Supreme Council of the Armed Forces. He was later ordered to stand trial on charges of killing peaceful protesters during the revolution. These trials began on 3 August 2011, making him the first Arab leader to be tried in his own country in an ordinary court of law. On 2 June 2012, an Egyptian court sentenced Mubarak to life imprisonment. After sentencing, he was reported to have suffered a series of health crises. On 13 January 2013, Egypt's Court of Cassation (the nation's high court of appeal) overturned Mubarak's sentence and ordered a retrial. On retrial, Mubarak and his sons were convicted on 9 May 2015 of corruption and given prison sentences. Mubarak was detained in a military hospital while his sons were freed on 12 October 2015 by a Cairo court. Mubarak was acquitted on 2 March 2017 by the Court of Cassation and was released on 24 March 2017.

Mubarak died in 2020, aged 91. He was honoured with a military funeral and buried at a family plot outside Cairo. Mubarak's presidency lasted almost thirty years, making him Egypt's longest-serving ruler since Muhammad Ali Pasha, who ruled the country for 43 years from 1805 to 1848.

== Early life and education ==
Hosni Mubarak was born on 4 May 1928 in Kafr El-Meselha, Monufia Governorate, Egypt. On 2 February 1949, he left the Military Academy and joined the Air Force Academy, gaining his commission as a pilot officer on 13 March 1950 and eventually receiving a bachelor's degree in aviation sciences.

== Air Force career ==
Mubarak served as an Egyptian Air Force officer in various formations and units; he spent two years in a Spitfire fighter squadron. Some time in the 1950s, he returned to the Air Force Academy as an instructor, remaining there until early 1959. From February 1959 to June 1961, Mubarak undertook further training in the Soviet Union, attending a Soviet pilot training school in Moscow and another at Kant Air Base near Bishkek in the Kirghiz Soviet Socialist Republic.

Mubarak undertook training on the Ilyushin Il-28 and Tupolev Tu-16 jet bombers. In 1964 he gained a place at the Frunze Military Academy in Moscow. On his return to Egypt, he served as a wing commander, then as a base commander; he commanded the Cairo West Air Base in October 1966 then briefly commanded the Beni Suef Air Base. In November 1967, Mubarak became the Air Force Academy's commander when he was credited with doubling the number of Air Force pilots and navigators during the pre-October War years. Two years later, he became Chief of Staff for the Egyptian Air Force.

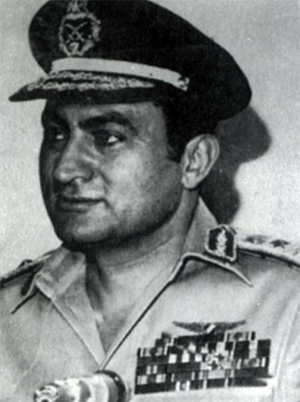
General Mubarak as Commander of the Air Force

In 1972, Mubarak became Commander of the Air Force and Egyptian Deputy Minister of Defense. On 6 October 1973, at the breakout of the Yom Kippur War, the Egyptian Air Force launched a surprise attack on Israeli soldiers on the east bank of the Suez Canal. Egyptian pilots hit 90% of their targets, making Mubarak a national hero. The next year he was promoted to Air Chief Marshal in recognition of service during the October War of 1973 against Israel. Mubarak was credited in some publications for Egypt's initial strong performance in the war. The Egyptian analyst Mohamed Hassanein Heikal said the Air Force played a mostly psychological role in the war, providing an inspirational sight for the Egyptian ground troops who carried out the crossing of the Suez Canal, rather than for any military necessity. However Mubarak's influence was also disputed by Shahdan El-Shazli, the daughter of the former Egyptian military Chief of Staff Saad el-Shazly. She said Mubarak exaggerated his role in the 1973 war. In a 2011 interview with the independent Egyptian newspaper Al-Masry Al-Youm, El-Shazli said Mubarak altered documents to take credit from her father for the initial success of the Egyptian forces in 1973. She also said photographs pertaining to the discussions in the military command room were altered and Saad El-Shazli was erased and replaced with Mubarak. She stated she intended to take legal action.

== Vice President of Egypt ==
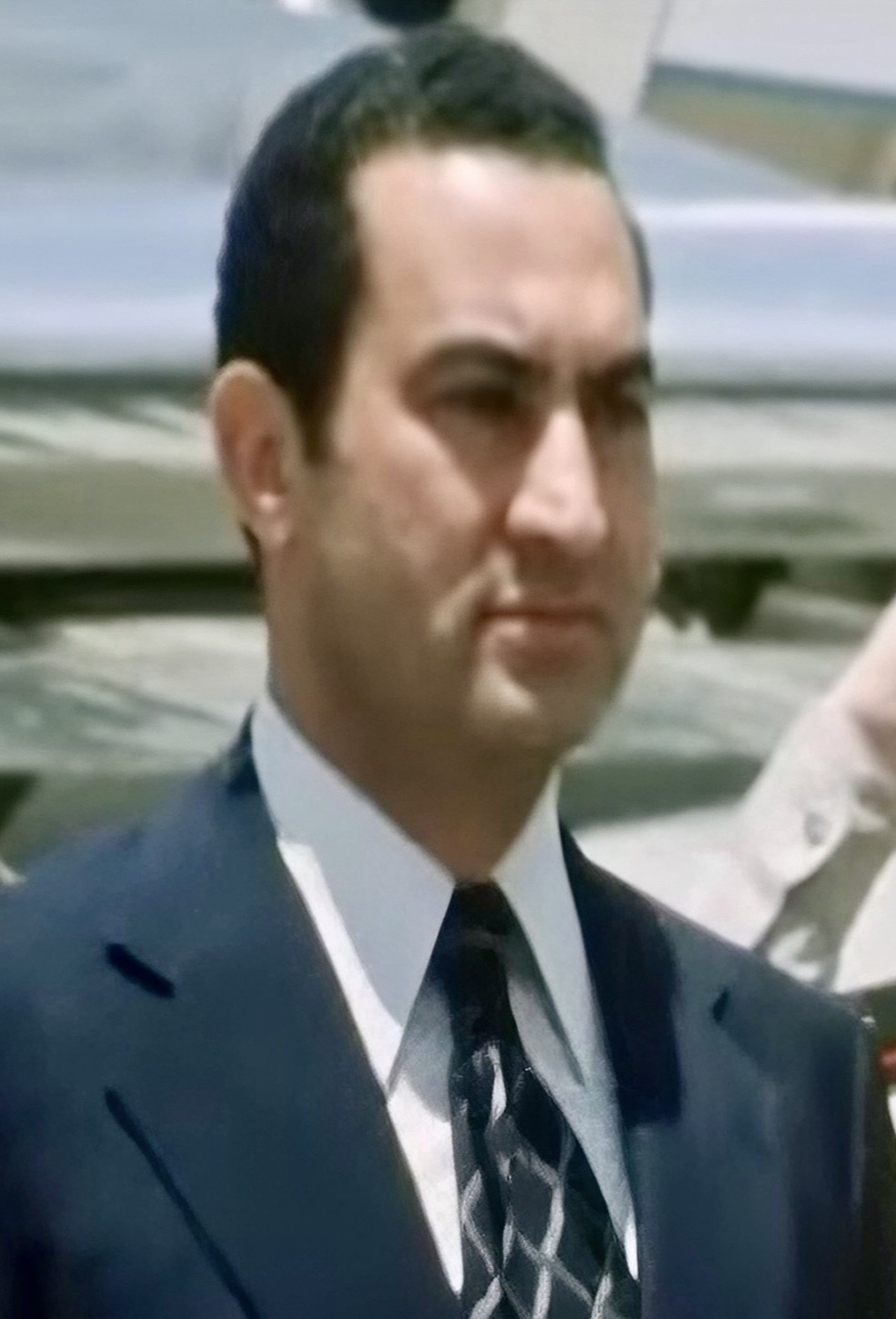
Vice President Mubarak in 1975

In April 1975, President Anwar Sadat appointed Mubarak Vice President of Egypt. In this position, he took part in government consultations that dealt with the future disengagement of forces agreement with Israel. In September 1975, Mubarak went on a mission to Riyadh and Damascus to persuade the Saudi Arabian and Syrian governments to accept the disengagement agreement signed with the Israeli government ("Sinai II"), but was refused a meeting by the Syrian president Hafez al-Assad. During his meetings with the Saudi government, Mubarak developed a friendship with the nation's powerful Crown Prince Fahd, whom Sadat had refused to meet or contact and who was now seen as a major player who could help mend the failing relationship between Egypt and Saudi Arabia. Mubarak also developed friendships with several other important Arab leaders, including Saudi Foreign Minister Prince Saud, Oman's Sultan Qaboos, Morocco's King Hassan II, and Sudan's President Jaafar Nimeiry.

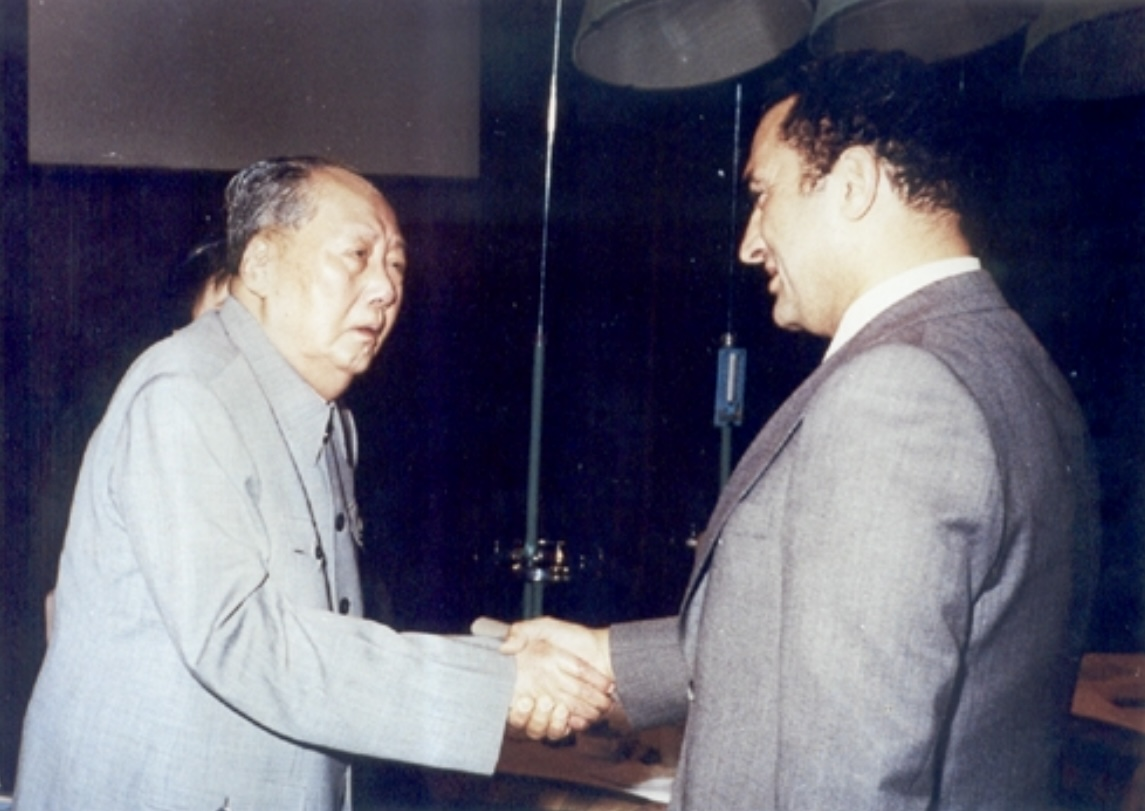
Meeting Chinese Leader Mao Zedong in Beijing, 1976

Sadat also sent Mubarak to numerous meetings with foreign leaders outside the Arab world. Mubarak's political significance as Vice President can be seen from a conversation held on 23 June 1975 between Foreign Minister Fahmy and US Ambassador Hermann Eilts. Fahmy told Eilts that "Mubarak is, for the time being at least, likely to be a regular participant in all sensitive meetings" and he advised the ambassador not to antagonize Mubarak because he was Sadat's personal choice. Though supportive of Sadat's earlier efforts made to bring the Sinai Peninsula back into Egyptian control, Mubarak agreed with the views of various Arab leaders and opposed the Camp David Accords for failing to address other issues relating to the Arab–Israeli conflict. Sadat even transferred his decision-making authority to Mubarak temporarily at times he went on vacations.

== Presidency ==
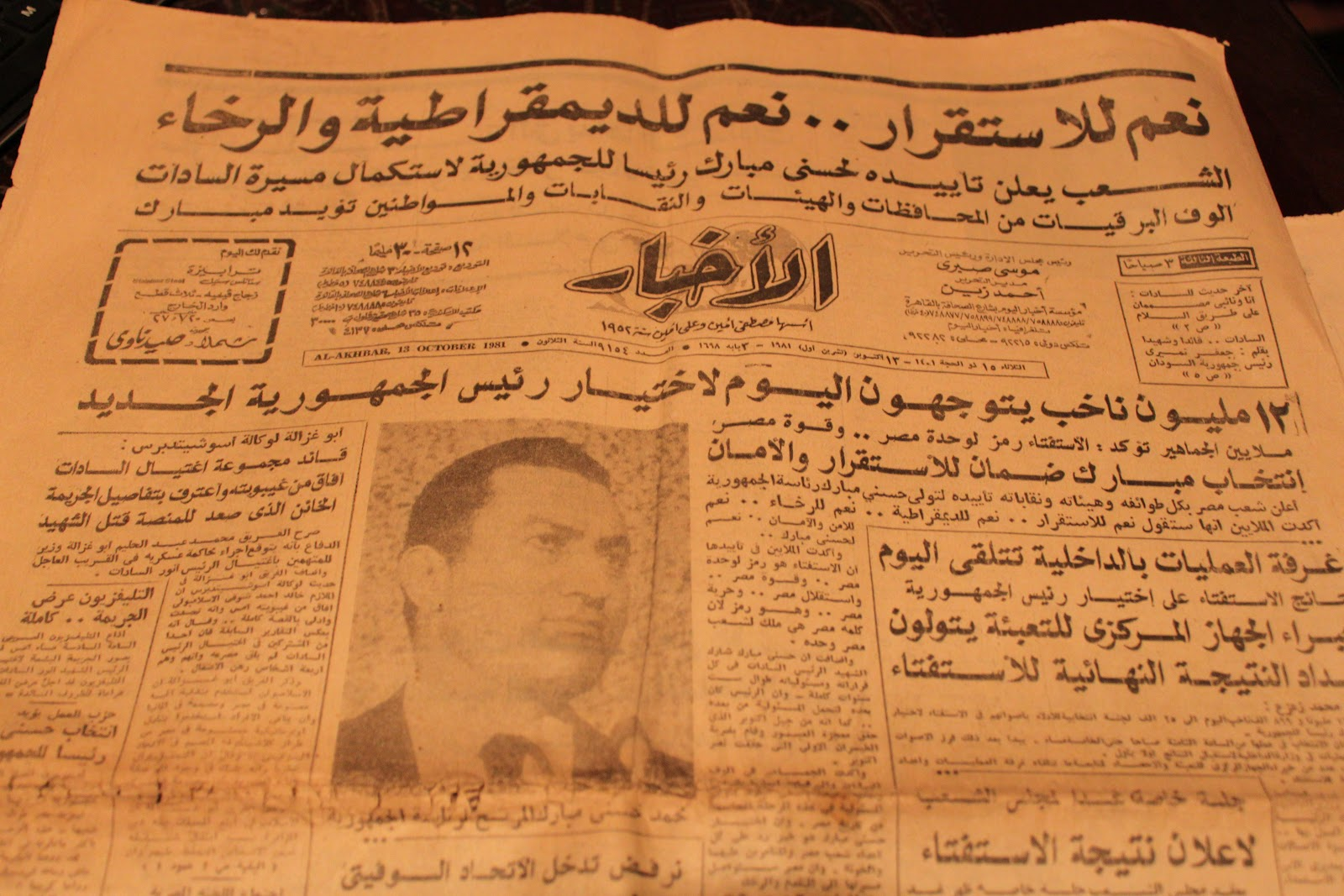
Egyptian presidential referendum 1981 Akhbar newspaper

Mubarak was injured during the assassination of President Sadat in October 1981 by soldiers led by Lieutenant Khalid Islambouli; however, the assassination plot altogether was acknowledged to have been led by Muhammad Abd al-Salam Faraj. Following Sadat's death, Mubarak became the fourth president of Egypt.

=== Egypt's return to the Arab League ===
Until Libya's suspension from the Arab League at the beginning of the Libyan Civil War, Egypt was the only state in the history of the organization to have had its membership suspended, because of President Sadat's peace treaty with Israel. In June 1982, Mubarak met King Fahd of Saudi Arabia, which marked a beginning of an Egyptian-Saudi rapprochement. Since Egypt is the most populous Arab country and Saudi Arabia the richest, the Saudi–Egyptian axis was a powerful force in the Arab world. At an Arab League summit later in 1982 in Fez, Saudi Arabia put forward an Egyptian peace plan where in exchange for Israel resolving the Israeli–Palestinian conflict by allowing a Palestinian state, the entire Arab world would make peace with Israel.

The Islamic Republic of Iran had, from 1979 onward, been making the claim to be the leader of the Islamic world, and in particular Ayatollah Khomeini had called for the overthrow of the governments of Iraq, Saudi Arabia, Kuwait and other Arab states along the southern shores of the Persian Gulf, calling these states illegitimate. The claim of the Ayatollah Khomeini to be the rightful leader of the Islamic world and his attempts to export the Iranian revolution by working to overthrow governments that Khomeini deemed un-Islamic caused profound alarm and fear in the governments that were targeted like Iraq and Saudi Arabia. In the face of the Iranian challenge, the other Arab states looked towards Egypt as an ally. For King Fahd of Saudi Arabia and the other leaders of the Arab Gulf states, the Israeli–Palestinian conflict faded into the background and the main concern was resisting Iranian pretensions to be the leader of the Islamic world, meaning that Egypt could not be ignored.

During the Iran–Iraq War from 1980 to 1988, Egypt supported Iraq militarily and economically with one million Egyptians working in Iraq to take the place of Iraqi men serving on the front-line. In December 1983, Mubarak welcomed Yasser Arafat of the PLO to a summit in Cairo, marking a rapprochement with the PLO, and from that time, Egypt became the PLO's main ally. In 1985, the Achille Lauro hijacking caused a major crisis in relations when the U.S. Air Force forced an EgyptAir plane carrying the Achille Lauro hijackers to Tunisia to land in Italy; otherwise the plane would have been shot down. Mubarak stated in a press conference on 12 October 1985: "I am very wounded. Now there is coolness and strain as a result of this incident." Egypt had been ostracized by the other Arab states for signing the Camp David Accords in 1979, but Egypt's weight within the Arab world had led to Egypt regaining its "central place in the Arab world" by 1989. In 1989, Egypt was re-admitted as a full member to the Arab League and the League's headquarters were moved to their original location in Cairo.

=== Governing style ===
Throughout the 1980s, Mubarak increased the production of affordable housing, clothing, furniture, and medicine. The state remained large under Mubarak employing 8 million people out of a population of 75 million.

By the time he became president, Mubarak was one of a few Egyptian officials who refused to visit Israel and vowed to take a less enthusiastic approach to normalizing relations with the Israeli government. Under Mubarak, Israeli journalists often wrote about the "cold peace" with Egypt, observing Israeli–Egyptian relations were frosty at best. Mubarak was quick to deny that his policies would result in difficulties for Egyptian–Israeli dealings in the future.

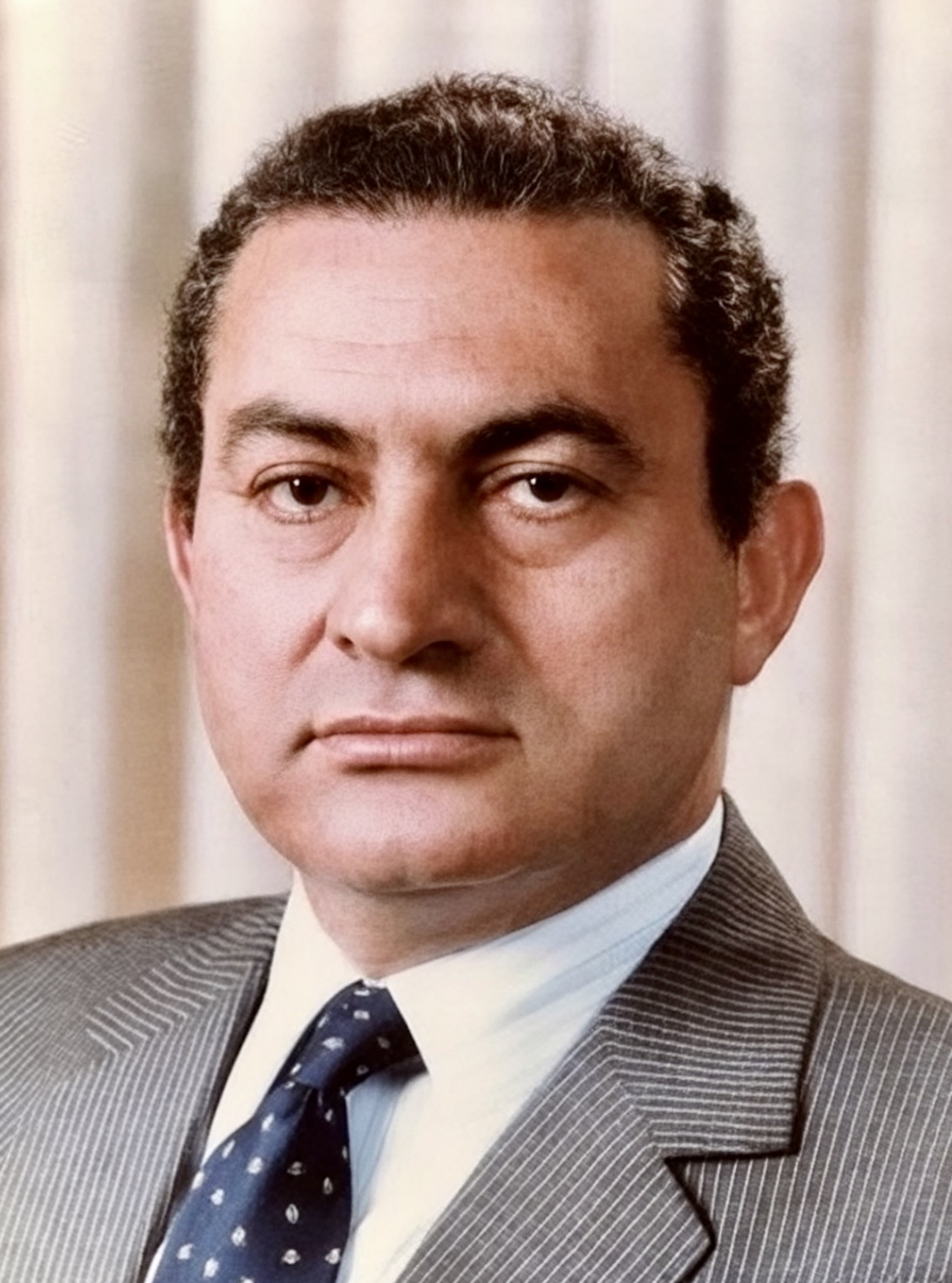
Official portrait in 1982

The Israeli historian Major Efraim Karsh wrote in 2006 that in Egypt "...numberless articles, scholarly writings, books, cartoons, public statements, and radio and television programs, Jews are painted in the blackest terms imaginable". Karsh accused Mubarak of being personally antisemitic, writing he "evidently shared the premises" of his propaganda.

Egypt's heavy dependence on US aid and its hopes for US pressure on Israel for a Palestinian settlement continued under Mubarak.

Mubarak took significant steps to improve relations with the then-Soviet Union. In 1984, he reestablished diplomatic ties that had been severed by his predecessor, Anwar Sadat, in 1981. This move marked a shift from the previous estrangement and aimed to diversify Egypt's international partnerships.

In his early years in power, Mubarak expanded the Egyptian State Security Investigations Service (Mabahith Amn ad-Dawla) and the Central Security Forces (anti-riot and containment forces). According to Tarek Osman, the experience of seeing his predecessor assassinated "right in front of him" and his lengthy military career—which was longer than those of Nasser or Sadat—may have instilled in him more focus and absorption with security than seemed the case with the latter heads of state. Mubarak sought advice and confidence not in leading ministers, senior advisers or leading intellectuals, but from his security chiefs—"interior ministers, army commanders, and the heads of the ultra-influential intelligence services."

Because of his positions against Islamic fundamentalism and his diplomacy towards Israel, Mubarak was the target of repeated assassination attempts. According to the BBC, Mubarak survived six attempts on his life. In June 1995, an assassination attempt occurred when assailants opened fire on Mubarak's convoy in Addis Ababa, where he was attending a conference of the Organization of African Unity. He was also reportedly injured by a knife-wielding assailant in Port Said in September 1999.

=== Repression and torture ===
During Hosni Mubarak's presidency, Egypt was marked by widespread human rights abuses, including arbitrary detention and systematic torture. The government maintained a continuous state of emergency, granting security forces extensive powers to arrest and detain individuals without due process. Reports from human rights organizations highlight the pervasive use of torture in police stations and detention centers. Detainees were subjected to severe beatings, electric shocks, suspension by the wrists and ankles, and sexual violence. These practices were not isolated incidents but part of a systematic approach to suppress dissent and control the population. The lack of accountability for security forces further entrenched a culture of impunity, allowing such violations to persist throughout Mubarak's tenure.

=== Israeli–Palestinian conflict ===
During his presidency, Mubarak upheld the U.S.-brokered Camp David Accords treaty signed between Egypt and Israel in 1978. Mubarak on occasion also hosted meetings relating to the Israeli-Palestinian conflict and made a number of attempts to serve as a broker between them. Mubarak was concerned that Rabbi Menachem M. Schneerson did not trust him on the issue and considered meeting him in New York.

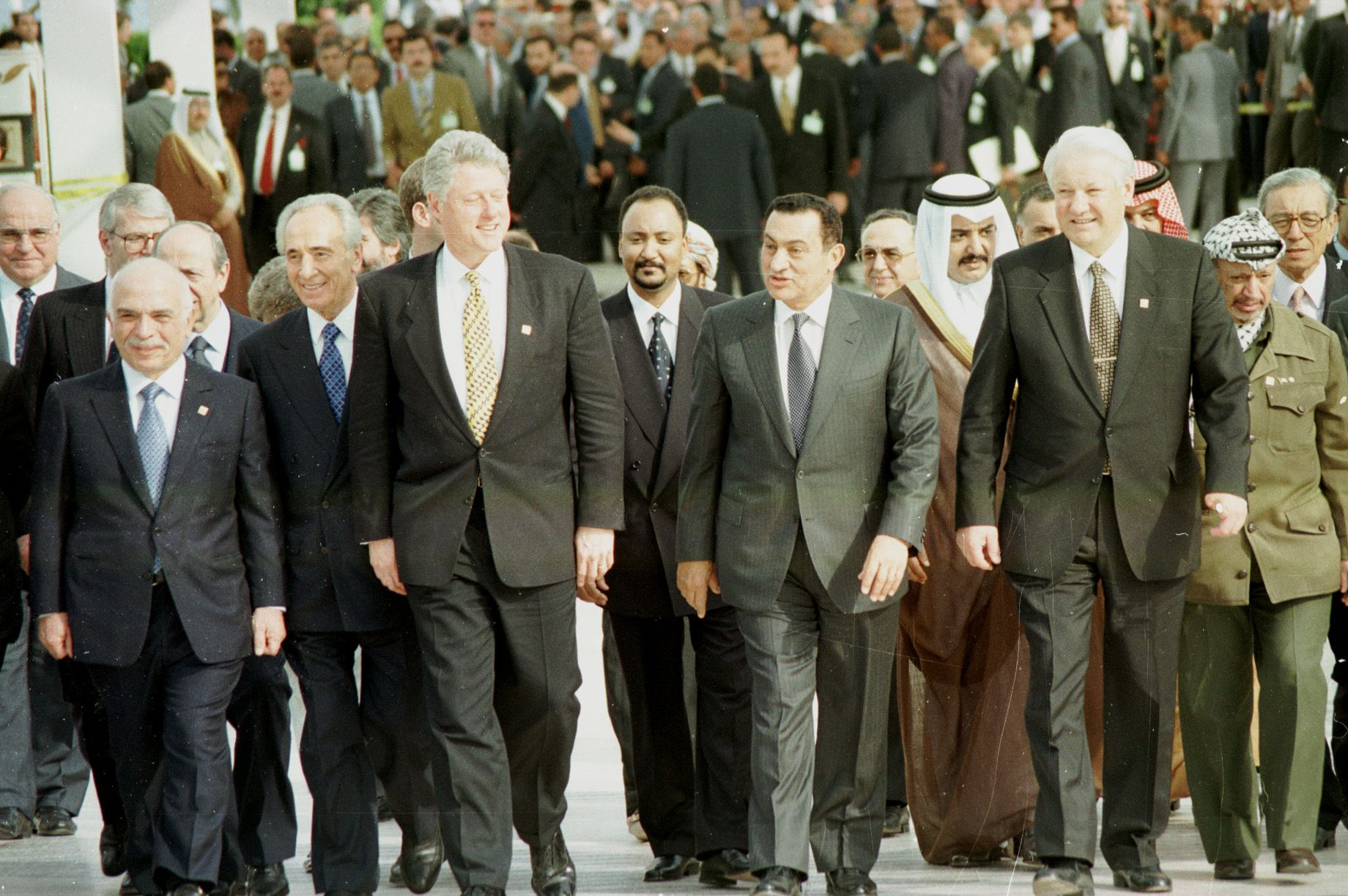
Leaders of the world participated the Sharm El-Sheikh Peace Summit. From left: King Husein (Jordan), Shimon Peres (Israel), Bill Clinton (USA) Mubarak, Boris Yeltsin (Russia), Yasser Arafat (PLO).

In October 2000, Mubarak hosted an emergency summit meeting at Sharm el-Sheikh to discuss the Israeli-Palestinian conflict. In attendance were: U.S. President Bill Clinton, P.L.O. Chairman Yasser Arafat, Israeli Prime Minister Ehud Barak, King Abdullah of Jordan, NATO Sec. General Javier Solana, and U.N. Sec. General Kofi Annan. Mubarak was involved in the Arab League, supporting Arab efforts to achieve a lasting peace in the region. At the Beirut Summit on 28 March 2002, the league adopted the Arab Peace Initiative, a Saudi-inspired plan to end the Arab–Israeli conflict. In 2006, Mubarak condemned the Israeli military attack in Lebanon, but also indirectly criticised Hezbollah for harming Arab interests.

In June 2007, Mubarak held a summit meeting at Sharm el-Sheik with King Abdullah II of Jordan, President Mahmoud Abbas and Prime Minister Ehud Olmert. On 19 June 2008, the Egypt-brokered pause in hostilities between Israel and Hamas went into effect. According to The New York Times, neither side fully respected the terms of the ceasefire.

The agreement required Hamas to end rocket attacks on Israel and to enforce the ceasefire throughout Gaza. In exchange, Hamas expected the blockade to end, commerce in Gaza to resume, and truck shipments to be restored to 2005 levels. Israel tied an easing of the blockade to a reduction in rocket fire and gradually re-opened supply lines and permitted around 90 daily truck shipments to enter Gaza. Hamas criticized Israel for its continued blockade while Israel accused Hamas of continued weapons smuggling via tunnels to Egypt and pointed to continued rocket attacks. In 2009, Mubarak's government banned the Cairo Anti-war Conference, which had criticised his lack of action against Israel.

In August 2009, he visited Washington to meet the new administration, which he had been refraining from visiting since April 2004, justifying that by the positions of the Bush administration.

=== Gulf War of 1991 ===
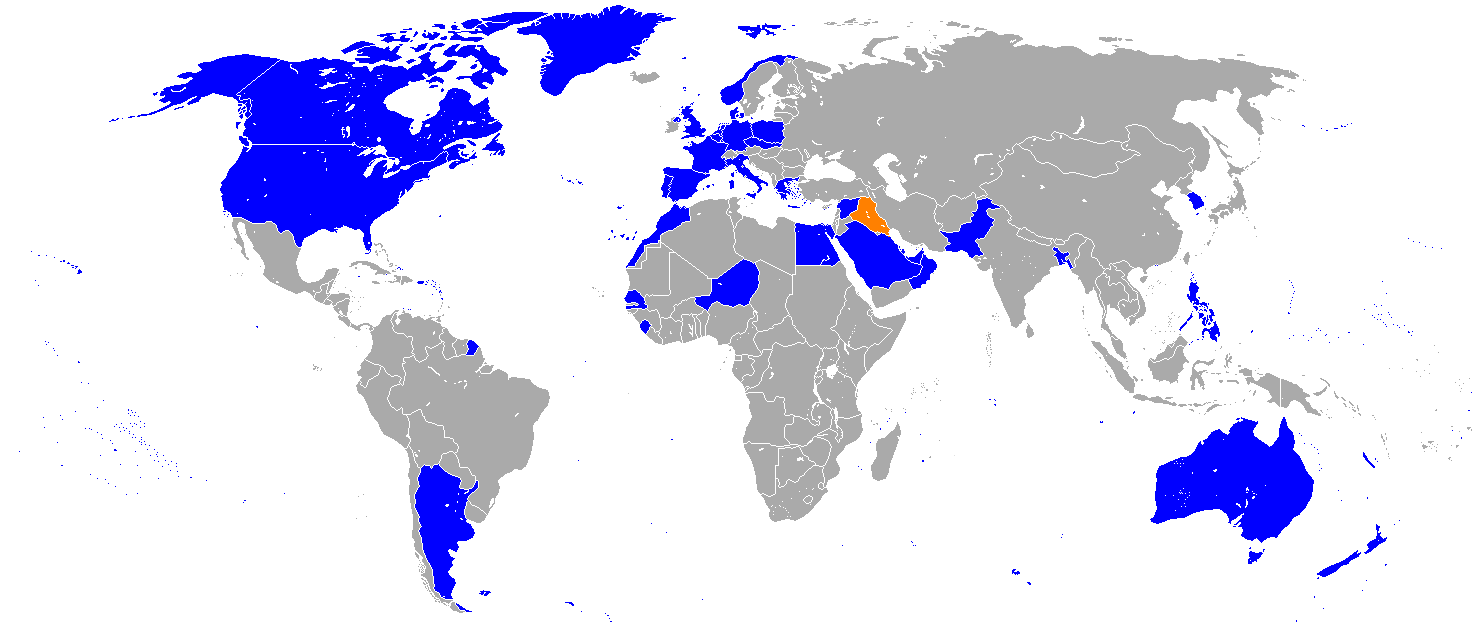
Egypt was in the coalition against Iraq in the Gulf War

Egypt was a member of the allied coalition during the 1991 Gulf War; Egyptian infantry were some of the first to land in Saudi Arabia to remove Iraqi forces from Kuwait. Egypt's participation in the war solidified its central role in the Arab World and brought financial benefits for the Egyptian government. Reports of sums of up to US$20 billion worth of debt forgiveness were published in the news media. According to The Economist:

The programme worked like a charm: a textbook case, says the [International Monetary Fund]. In fact, luck was on Hosni Mubarak's side; when the US was hunting for a military alliance to force Iraq out of Kuwait, Egypt's president joined without hesitation. After the war, his reward was that America, the Arab states of the Persian Gulf, and Europe forgave Egypt around $20 billion of debt.

=== Stance on the 2003 invasion of Iraq ===
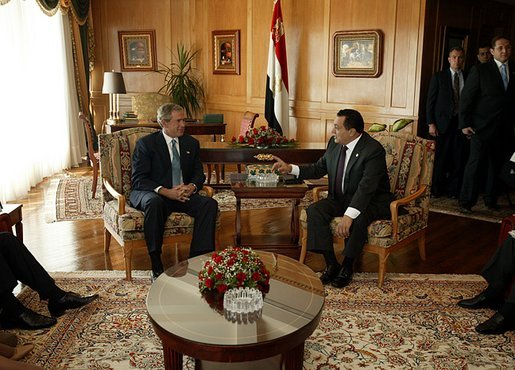
With the U.S. President, George W. Bush in Sharm El-Sheikh, June 2003

Mubarak spoke out against the 2003 invasion of Iraq, arguing that the Israeli–Palestinian conflict should have been resolved first. He also said the war would cause "100 Bin Ladens". However, as president he did not support an immediate US withdrawal from Iraq because he believed it would probably lead to chaos.

=== 2005 elections ===
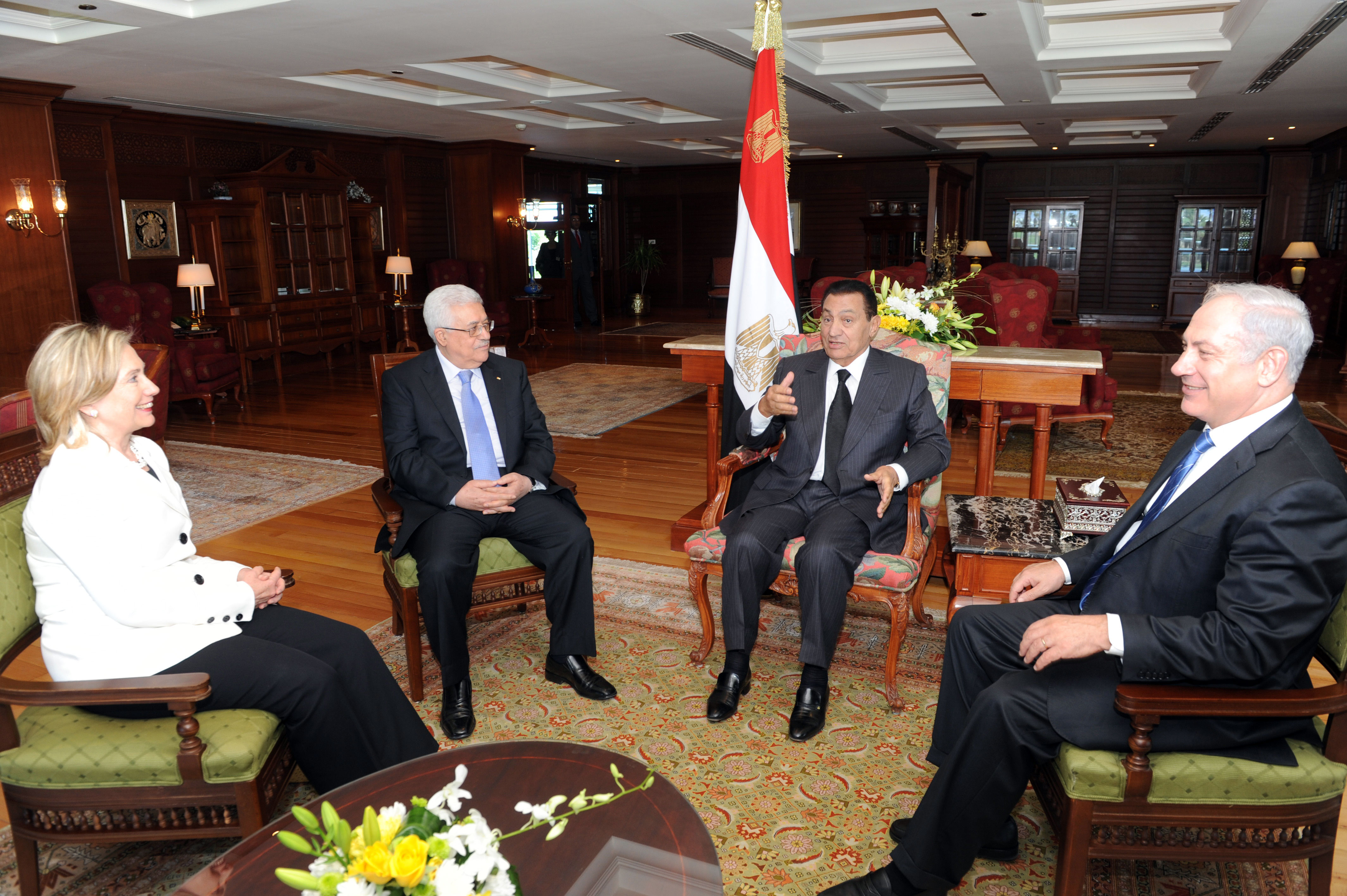
Mubarak meeting with U.S. State Secretary Hillary Clinton, Palestinian president Mahmoud Abbas, and Israeli Prime Minister Benjamin Netanyahu at Sharm el-Sheikh on 14 September 2010.

President Mubarak was re-elected by majority votes in a referendum for successive terms on four occasions in 1987, 1993, and 1999. Each time, Mubarak secured his position by having himself nominated by Parliament then confirmed without opposition in a referendum.

The September 2005 ballot was a multiple-candidate election rather than a referendum, but the electoral institutions and security apparatus remain under the control of the President. On 28 July 2005, Mubarak announced his candidacy. The election was scheduled for 7 September 2005; according to civil organizations that observed the election it was marred by mass rigging activities. In a move widely seen as political persecution, Ayman Nour, a dissident and candidate for the El-Ghad Party ("Tomorrow Party") was convicted of forgery and sentenced to five years' hard labor on 24 December 2005.

=== Widespread corruption ===
While in office, political corruption in the Mubarak administration's Ministry of the Interior rose dramatically. Political figures and young activists were imprisoned without trial. Illegal, undocumented, hidden detention facilities were established, and universities, mosques, and newspaper staff were rejected because of their political views.

In 2005 Freedom House, a non-governmental organization that conducts research into democracy, reported that the Egyptian government under Mubarak expanded bureaucratic regulations, registration requirements, and other controls that often feed corruption. Freedom House said, "corruption remained a significant problem under Mubarak, who promised to do much, but in fact never did anything significant to tackle it effectively".

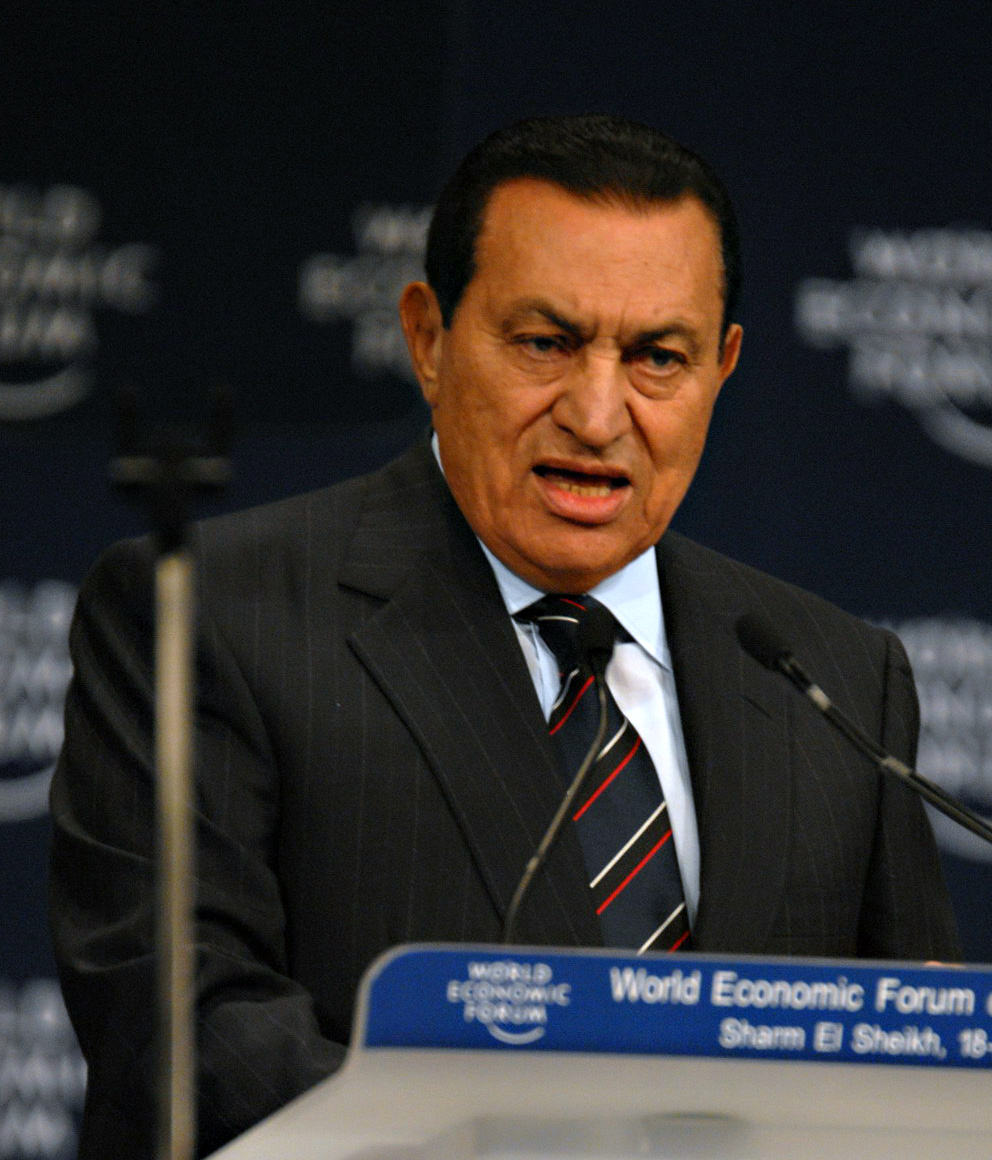
Mubarak giving a speech at the World Economic Forum on the Middle East at Sharm el-Sheikh, May 2008.

In 2010, Transparency International's Corruption Perceptions Index report assessed Egypt with a CPI score of 3.1, based on perceptions of the degree of corruption from business people and country analysts, with 10 being very clean and 0 being highly corrupt. Egypt ranked 98th out of the 178 countries included in the report.

=== Wealth and allegations of personal corruption ===
In February 2011, ABC News reported that experts believed the personal wealth of Mubarak and his family was between US$40 billion and US$70 billion from military contracts made during his time as an air force officer. The Guardian reported that Mubarak and his family might be worth up to US$70 billion garnered from corruption, bribes and legitimate business activities. The money was said to be spread out in various bank accounts, including some in Switzerland and the UK, and invested in foreign property. The newspaper said some of the information about the family's wealth might be ten years old. According to Newsweek, these allegations are poorly substantiated and lack credibility.

On 12 February 2011, the government of Switzerland announced it was freezing the Swiss bank accounts of Mubarak and his family. On 20 February 2011, the Egyptian Prosecutor General ordered the freezing of Mubarak's assets and those of his wife Suzanne, his sons Alaa and Gamal Mubarak, and his daughters-in-law Heidi Rasekh and Khadiga Gamal. The Prosecutor General also ordered the Egyptian foreign minister to communicate this to other countries where Mubarak and his family could have assets. This order came two days after Egyptian newspapers reported that Mubarak filed his financial statement. Egyptian regulations mandate government officials submit a financial statement listing their assets and sources of income while performing government work. On 21 February 2011, the Egyptian Military Council, which was temporarily given the presidential authorities following the 25 January 2011 revolution, said it had no objection to a trial of Mubarak on charges of corruption.

On 23 February 2011, the Egyptian newspaper Eldostor reported that a "knowledgeable source" described the order of the Prosecutor General to freeze Mubarak's assets and the threats of a legal action as nothing but a signal for Mubarak to leave Egypt after a number of attempts were made to encourage him to leave willingly. In February 2011, Voice of America reported that Egypt's top prosecutor had ordered a travel ban and an asset freeze for Mubarak and his family as he considered further action. On 21 May 2014 a Cairo court convicted Mubarak and his sons of embezzling the equivalent of US$17.6 million of state funds which were allocated for renovation and maintenance of presidential palaces but were instead diverted to upgrade private family homes. The court ordered the repayment of US$17.6 million, fined the trio US$2.9 million, and sentenced Mubarak to three years in prison and each of his sons to four years.

=== Presidential succession ===
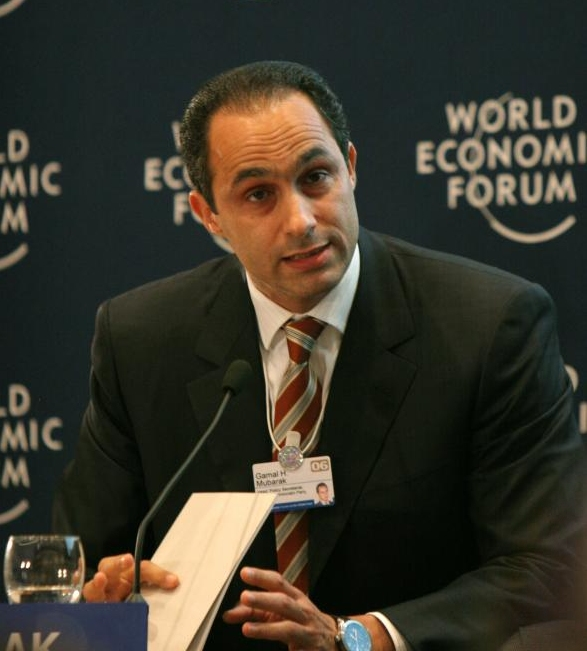
Gamal Mubarak, son of Hosni Mubarak

The National Democratic Party continued to state that Hosni Mubarak was to be the party's only candidate in the 2011 presidential election. Mubarak said on 1 February 2011 that he had no intention of standing in the 2011 presidential election. When this declaration failed to ease the protests, Mubarak's vice president stated that Gamal Mubarak would not run for president. With the escalation of the demonstration and the fall of Mubarak, Hamdy El-Sayed, a former influential figure in the National Democratic Party, said Gamal Mubarak intended to usurp the presidency, assisted by then Interior Minister, Habib El-Adly.

== Revolution and overthrow ==
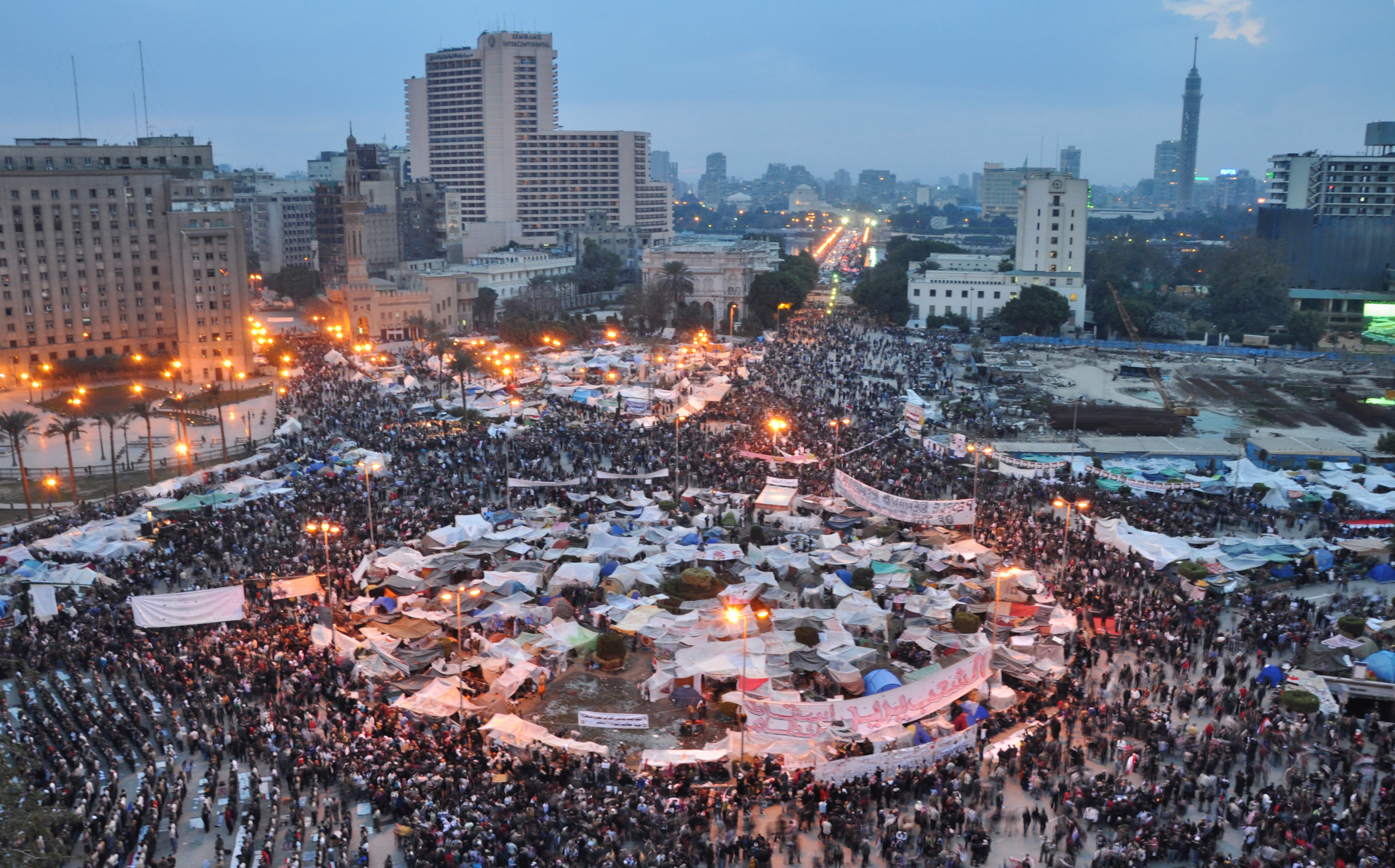
Massive protests centered on Cairo's Tahrir Square led to Mubarak's resignation in February 2011.

Protests against Mubarak and his regime erupted in Cairo and other Egyptian cities in January 2011. On 1 February, Mubarak announced he would not contest the presidential election due in September. He also promised constitutional reform. This did not satisfy most protesters, who expected Mubarak to depart immediately. The demonstrations continued and on 2 February, violent clashes occurred between pro-Mubarak and anti-Mubarak protesters.

On 10 February, contrary to rumours, Mubarak said he would not resign until the September election, though he would be delegating responsibilities to Vice President Omar Suleiman. The next day, Suleiman announced that Mubarak had resigned. The announcement sparked cheers, flag-waving, and celebrations from protesters in Egypt. Discussions about the nation's future direction began. It had been suggested that Egypt be put in the hands of a caretaker government.

=== Protests ===
On 25 January 2011, protests against Mubarak and his government erupted in Cairo and around Egypt calling for Mubarak's resignation. Mubarak stated in a speech that he would not leave, and would die on Egyptian soil. Opposition leader Mohamed ElBaradei paid no attention to Mubarak's remarks and labeled it as a trick designed to help Mubarak to stay in power. In a state televised broadcast on 1 February 2011, Mubarak announced that he would not seek re-election in September but would like to finish his current term and promised constitutional reform. This compromise was not acceptable for the protestors and violent demonstrations occurred in front of the Presidential Palace. On 11 February, then Vice President Omar Suleiman announced Mubarak had resigned and that power would be turned over to the Egyptian military.

Two and a half hours after Mubarak's resignation, an Egyptian military member came on air and thanked Mubarak for "putting the interests of the country first." The statement, which said "The Supreme Council is currently studying the situation," did not state what the council would do next.

== Post-overthrow life ==
Mubarak made no media appearances after his overthrow. Except for his family and a close circle of aides, he reportedly refused to talk to anyone—even his supporters. His health was speculated to be rapidly deteriorating; some reports said he was in a coma. Most sources said he was no longer interested in performing any duties and wanted to "die in Sharm El-Sheikh".

On 28 February 2011, the General Prosecutor of Egypt issued an order prohibiting Mubarak and his family from leaving Egypt. It was reported that Mubarak was in contact with his lawyer in case of possible criminal charges against him. As a result, Mubarak and his family were placed under house arrest at a presidential palace in the Red Sea resort of Sharm el-Sheikh. On 13 April 2011, a prosecutor originally appointed by Mubarak ordered the former president and both his sons to be detained for 15 days of questioning about allegations of corruption and abuse of power amid growing suspicion that the Egyptian military was more aligned with the Mubaraks than with the revolution. Gamal and Alaa were jailed in Tora Prison; state television reported that Mubarak was in police custody in a hospital near his residence following a heart attack. Former Israeli Cabinet minister Benjamin Ben Eliezer told Israeli Radio that he had offered Mubarak refuge in the southern Israeli city of Eilat.

On 11 May 2013, he told El-Watan in his first media appearance since his resignation said, "History will judge and I am still certain that the coming generations will view me fairly." He added that President Mohammed Morsi faced a tough time and that it was too early to judge him.

=== Trial ===
On 24 May 2011, Mubarak was ordered to stand trial on charges of premeditated murder of peaceful protesters during the revolution and, if convicted, could face the death penalty. The decision to try Mubarak was made days before a scheduled protest in Tahrir Square. The full list of charges released by the public prosecutor was "intentional murder, attempted killing of some demonstrators ... misuse of influence, deliberately wasting public funds and unlawfully making private financial gains and profits".

On 28 May, a Cairo administrative court found Mubarak guilty of damaging the national economy during the protests by shutting down the Internet and telephone services. He was fined LE200 million—about US$33.6 million—which the court ordered he must pay from his personal assets. This was the first court ruling against Mubarak, who would next have to answer to the murder charges.

The trial of Hosni Mubarak, his sons Ala'a and Gamal, former interior minister Habib el-Adly and six former top police officials began on 3 August 2011 at a temporary criminal court at the Police Academy in north Cairo. They were charged with corruption and the premeditated killing of peaceful protesters during the mass movement to oust the Mubarak government, the latter of which carries the death penalty. The trial was broadcast on Egyptian television; Mubarak made an unexpected appearance—his first since his resignation. He was taken into the court on a hospital bed and held in a cage for the session. Upon hearing the charges against him, Mubarak pleaded not guilty. Judge Ahmed Refaat adjourned the court, ruling that Mubarak be transferred under continued arrest to the military hospital on the outskirts of Cairo. The second court session scheduled for 15 August. On 15 August, the resumed trial lasted three hours. At the end of the session, Rifaat announced that the third session would take place on 5 September and that the remainder of the proceedings would be off-limits to television cameras.

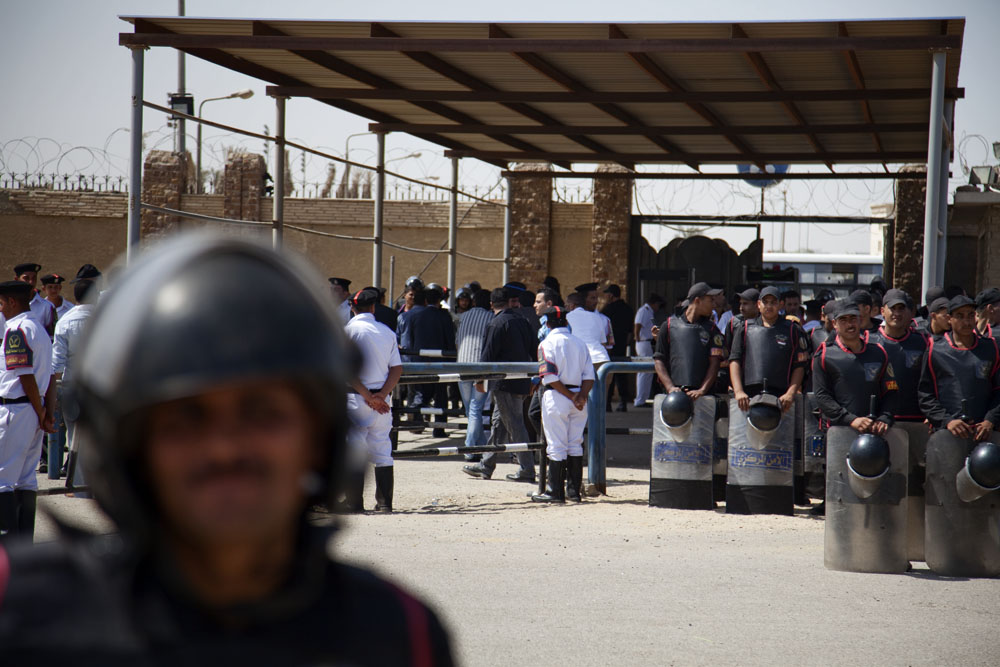
Riot police outside the courthouse where Mubarak was being sentenced on 2 June 2012

The trial resumed in December 2011 and lasted until January 2012. The defense strategy was that Mubarak never actually resigned, was still president, and thus had immunity. On 2 June 2012, Mubarak was found guilty of not halting the killing of protesters by the Egyptian security forces; he was sentenced to life imprisonment. The court found Mubarak not guilty of ordering the crackdown on Egyptian protesters. All other charges against Mubarak, including profiteering and economic fraud, were dismissed. Mubarak's sons, Habib el-Adly, and six senior police officials were all acquitted for their roles in the killing of demonstrators because of a lack of evidence. According to The Guardian, the relatives of those killed by Mubarak's forces were angered by the verdict. Thousands of demonstrators protested the verdict in Tahrir Square, Arbein Square and Al-Qaed Ibrahim Square.

In January 2013, an appeals court overturned Mubarak's life sentence and ordered a retrial. He remained in custody and returned to court on 11 May 2013 for a retrial on charges of complicity in the murder of protesters. On 21 August 2013, a Cairo court ordered his release. Judicial sources confirmed that the court had upheld a petition from Mubarak's longtime lawyer that called for his release. A day later, interim prime minister Hazem El Beblawi ordered that Mubarak be put under house arrest.

On 21 May 2014, while awaiting retrial, Mubarak and his sons were convicted on charges of embezzlement; Mubarak was sentenced to three years in prison, while his sons received four-year sentences. The three were fined the equivalent of US$2.9 million, and were ordered to repay US$17.6 million.

In November 2014, conspiracy to kill charges were dismissed by the Cairo Criminal Court on a technicality. The court also cleared Mubarak of corruption charges. On 13 January 2015, Egypt's Court of Cassation overturned Mubarak's and his sons' embezzlement charges, the last remaining conviction against him, and ordered a retrial. A retrial on the corruption charges led to a conviction and sentencing to three years in prison in May 2015 for Mubarak, with four-year terms for his sons, Gamal and Alaa. It was not immediately clear whether the sentence would take into account time already served—Mubarak and his sons had already spent more than three years in prison, so potentially would not have to serve any additional time. Supporters of Mubarak jeered the decision when it was announced in a Cairo courtroom on 9 May. The sentence also included a 125 million Egyptian pound (US$16.3 million) fine, and required the return of 21 million embezzled Egyptian pounds (US$2.7 million). These amounts were previously paid after the first trial.

=== Support for Sisi ===
Though mostly out of the public eye, Mubarak granted a rare interview in February 2014 with Kuwaiti journalist Fajer Al-Saeed, expressing support for then-Minister of Defense and Commander-in-Chief of the Egyptian Armed Forces Abdel Fattah el-Sisi as the next president of Egypt, recognizing that Sisi was working to restore the confidence of the Egyptian people. "The people want Sisi, and the people's will shall prevail," Mubarak noted. Mubarak also expressed great admiration and gratitude towards the late Sheikh Zayed bin Sultan Al Nahyan of the United Arab Emirates and his children, for their continuous support of Egypt and its people. However, Mubarak expressed his dislike of opposition politician Hamdeen Sabbahi, a Nasserist following the policies of Gamal Abdel Nasser.

=== Health problems ===
In July 2010, the media said Egypt was about to undergo dramatic change because Mubarak was thought to have cancer and because of the scheduled 2011 presidential election. Intelligence sources said he had esophageal cancer, stomach or pancreatic cancer; this was denied by Egyptian authorities. Speculation about his ill health increased after his resignation from the presidency. According to Egyptian media, Mubarak's condition worsened after he went into exile in Sharm el-Sheikh. He was reportedly depressed, refused to take medications, and was slipping into and out of unconsciousness. According to the source—an unnamed Egyptian security official—"Mubarak wants to be left alone and die in his homeland". The source denied that Mubarak was writing his memoirs, stating that he was almost completely unconscious. After his resignation, Egypt's ambassador to the United States Sameh Shoukry reported that his personal sources said Mubarak "is possibly in somewhat of bad health", while several Egyptian and Saudi Arabian newspapers reported that Mubarak was in a coma and close to death. On 12 April 2011, it was reported that he had been hospitalized after suffering a heart attack during questioning over possible corruption charges.

In June 2011, Mubarak's lawyer Farid el-Deeb said his client "has a stomach cancer and the tumours are growing." Mubarak had undergone surgery for the condition in Germany in 2010 and also suffered from circulatory problems with an irregular heart beat. On 13 July 2011, unconfirmed reports stated that Mubarak had slipped into a coma at his residence after giving his final speech, and on 17 July, el-Deeb confirmed the reports. On 26 July 2011, Mubarak was reported to be depressed and refusing solid food while in hospital being treated for a heart condition and in custody awaiting trial.

On 2 June 2012, Mubarak was reported as have suffered a health crisis while being transported to prison after his conviction on the charges of complicity in the killing of protestors. Some sources reported he had had a heart attack. Further reports stated that Mubarak's health continued to decline; some said he had to be treated with a defibrillator. On 20 June 2012, as Mubarak's condition continued to decline, state-run media erroneously reported that the former president had been declared "clinically dead", causing widespread confusion. Officials later clarified that Mubarak was in a critical condition.

On 27 December 2012, Mubarak was taken from Tora Prison to the Cairo military hospital after falling and breaking a rib. He was released from prison in August 2013.

On 19 June 2014, Mubarak slipped in the bathroom at the military hospital in Cairo where he was being held and broke his left leg, also fracturing his left thighbone, requiring surgery. Mubarak was serving a three-year sentence for corruption, and also awaiting retrial regarding the killing of protesters during his regime. At one time, his release was ordered. However, Mubarak had remained at the military hospital since January 2014 due to his ongoing health issues.

=== Acquittal ===
On 2 March 2017, the Court of Cassation, Egypt's top appeals court, acquitted Mubarak of conspiring in the killing of protesters during the 2011 uprising. He was subsequently released on 24 March 2017.

== Death ==
Hosni Mubarak died on 25 February 2020, in a Cairo military hospital, at the age of 91. A full-honour state funeral was held for him at the Tantawi Mosque in eastern Cairo, and he was later buried in a cemetery in Heliopolis. Egyptian president Abdel Fattah el-Sisi participated at the funeral and extended his condolences to Mubarak's widow, Suzanne, and his sons Alaa and Gamal; three days of national mourning were subsequently proclaimed.

Following his death, President El-Sisi praised Mubarak for his role in the Yom Kippur War but remained silent over his role as president. The government-controlled newspaper Al-Ahram eulogized Mubarak for his military and political career.

== Personal life ==
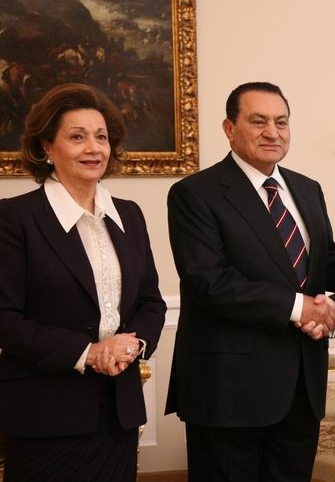
Mubarak with his wife Suzanne in 2008

Hosni Mubarak was married to Suzanne Thabet, with whom he had two sons: Alaa and Gamal. Both sons served four years in Egyptian jail for corruption and were released in 2015. Through his son Alaa, Mubarak has two grandsons, Mohammed and Omar; and through his son Gamal, he has a granddaughter Farida. Mohammed died in 2009 from a cerebral hemorrhage.

In April 2016, Alaa Mubarak was named in the Panama Papers as someone with financial interests that intersect with that of Mossack Fonseca, the firm implicated in that scandal.

== Awards ==
Coat of arms of Hosni Mubarak as Knight of the Royal Order of the Seraphim

=== National ===
- Grand Cordon of the Order of the Republic
- Grand Cordon of the Order of the Nile, 1st class
- Recipient of the Order of the Sinai Star
- Honor Star Medal, twice
- Military Training Medal

=== Foreign honours ===
- Brunei: Member of the Family Order of Laila Utama
- Bulgaria: First Class of the Order of the Balkan Mountains
- Central African Republic: Grand Officer of the Order of Recognition
- Democratic Republic of Congo: Grand Officer of the National Order of the Leopard (Zaire)
- Denmark: Knight of the Order of the Elephant
- France: Grand Cross of the Legion of Honour
- Germany: Grand Cross of the Order of Merit of the Federal Republic of Germany
- Greece: Grand Cross of the Order of the Redeemer
- India: Recipient of the Jawaharlal Nehru Award
- Indonesia: First Class (Adipurna) of the Star of the Republic of Indonesia, 1st class
- Pahlavi dynasty:
  - First Class of the Order of Zolfaghar
  - Recipient of the Hamayon Merit
- Italy: Knight Grand Cross of the Order of Merit of the Italian Republic
- Japan: Grand Cordon of the Order of the Chrysanthemum
- Kazakhstan: Recipient of the Order of the Golden Eagle
- Kuwait: Collar of the Order of Mubarak the Great
- Mali: Grand Cross of the National Order of Mali
- Mexico: Grand Cross of the Order of the Aztec Eagle
- Nepal: Member First Class of the Order of the Star of Nepal
- Niger: Grand Cross of the National Order of Niger
- North Korea: First Class of the Order of the National Flag
- Oman:
  - 1st Class of the Order of Oman, civil
  - Recipient of the Civil Order of Oman
- Palestine: Honor Star Medal
- Poland: Grand Cross of the Order of Merit of the Republic of Poland
- Portugal: Grand Collar of the Order of Prince Henry
- Saudi Arabia:
  - First Class of the Order of King Abdulaziz
  - Second Class of the Order of King Abdulaziz
  - Excellent Degree
- South Africa: Grand Officer of the Order of Good Hope
- Spain: Knight of the Collar of Order of Isabella the Catholic
- Sudan: Recipient of the Collar of Honour
- Sweden: Knight of the Royal Order of the Seraphim
- Syria:
  - Member First Class of the Order of the Umayyads
  - Knight of the Military Honor Medal
- Tunisia:
  - Grand Cross of the Order of the Republic
  - Grand Cross of the Order of 7 November 1987
- Turkey: First Class of the Order of the State of Republic of Turkey
- United Kingdom: Honorary Knight Grand Cross of the Order of St Michael and St George
- Yugoslavia: Order of the Yugoslav Great Star on 26 February 1984

Military offices
Preceded by Yahia Saleh Al-Aidaros	Director of the Egyptian Air Academy; 1967–1969	Succeeded by Mahmoud Shaker
Preceded by Ali Mustafa Baghdady	Commander of the Egyptian Air Force; 1972–1975	Succeeded by Mahmoud Shaker
Political offices
Vacant Title last held by Hussein el-Shafei	Vice-President of Egypt; 1975–1981	Vacant Title next held by Omar Suleiman
Preceded by Anwar El Sadat	Prime Minister of Egypt; 1981–1982	Succeeded by Ahmad Fuad Mohieddin
Preceded by Sufi Abu Taleb; Acting	President of Egypt; 1981–2011	Succeeded by Mohamed Morsi
Party political offices
Preceded by Anwar El Sadat	Chairman of the National Democratic Party; 1982–2011	Succeeded by Ahmed Shafik
Diplomatic posts
Preceded by Moussa Traoré	Chairman of the Organisation of African Unity; 1989–1990	Succeeded by Yoweri Museveni
Preceded by Abdou Diouf	Chairman of the Organisation of African Unity; 1993–1994	Succeeded by Zine El Abidine Ben Ali
Preceded by Raúl Castro	Secretary General of the Non-Aligned Movement; 2009–2011	Succeeded by Mohamed Hussein Tantawi; Acting
