= Atef Sadat =

Egyptian fighter pilot (1948–1973)

Mohamed Atef Anwar Sadat
- محمد عاطف أنور السادات
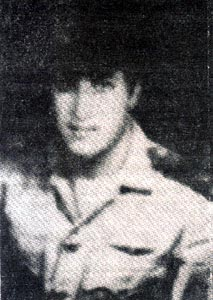
- Born: 13 March 1948; Mit Abu El Kom, Kingdom of Egypt
- Died: 6 October 1973 (aged 25); Israeli-occupied Sinai Peninsula, Egypt
- Military career
- Allegiance: (United Arab Republic) UAR Egypt (1966–1970); Egypt (1970–1973)
- Branch: Egyptian Air Force
- Service years: 1966–1973
- Rank: Flight lieutenant
- Conflicts: Six-Day War; Yom Kippur War; First Egyptian Air Strike †
- Awards: Order of the Sinai Star

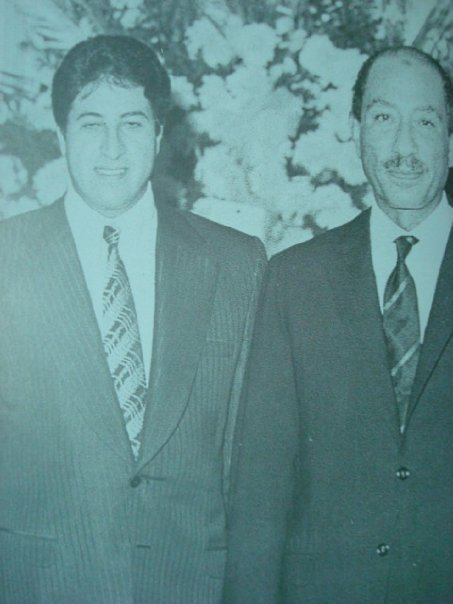
Atef with his half-brother, Anwar

Mohamed Atef Anwar Sadat (Arabic: محمد عاطف أنور السادات; 13 March 1948 – 6 October 1973) was an Egyptian fighter pilot and war hero. In the first hour of the Yom Kippur War, he was killed in action while conducting an aerial raid on an airport in the Israeli-occupied Sinai Peninsula. He was the younger half-brother of the then Egyptian president Anwar Sadat, who was assassinated on the same day eight years later.

== Early life and career ==
Atef Sadat was born on 13 March 1948 in the village of Mit Abu El Kom, Tala District, in Monufia Governorate. He graduated from the Egyptian Air Academy in 1966, and spent two years in the Soviet Union, attending a training program on jet fighters and then fighter bombers (the Sukhoi Su-7).

== Yom Kippur War ==
On 5 October 1973, a state of readiness was launched at Bilbeis Airport, and every pilot ran a fighter inside the fortified aircraft complex, and the planes were armed with bombs and ready, but the mission was cancelled as this was a training exercise on assembling pilots.

During the First Egyptian Air Strike, Atef Sadat was part of Sukhoi Su-7 formation that attacked the Israeli Meliz airfield. In the course of the attack, Atef's plane was shot down and he was killed.

=== Reports of his death ===
To avoid distracting her husband, Jehan Sadat waited until the eighth day of the war before breaking the news of his brother's death to him. He was first reported dead on 5 January 1974 by Egyptian newspapers. On 31 March 1974, a spokesman of the Israel Defense Forces disclosed that a search party had found his body in the sands of the western Sinai Peninsula and that it had handed him over to the Egyptian government. He was buried the same day in his hometown of Mit Abu El Kom.

== Awards and honours ==
Order of the Sinai Star: When the celebration was held to honor the heroes of October in the People's Assembly, Anwar Sadat received the Order of the Sinai Star in honor of his stepbrother's name, and the Minister of War, Ahmad Ismail Ali, handed him the medal.
