= Orders, decorations, and medals of Egypt =

Orders, decorations, and medals of Egypt include:

- Order of the Nile (قلادة النيل)
- Pendant of the Republic (قلادة الجمهورية)
- The Nile Sash (وشاح النيل)
- Military Medal of the Republic (وسام الجمهورية العسكري; two classes)
- Order of the Sinai Star (وسام نجمة سيناء; two classes, no longer awarded)
- Order of Honor Star (وسام نجمة الشرف)
- Order of Military Star (وسام النجمة العسكرية)
- Order of the Republic (وسام الجمهورية; five classes)
- Order of Merit (وسام الاستحقاق; five classes)
- Order of the Virtues (وسام الكمال; four classes)
- Medal of Work (وسام العمل; four classes)
- Medal of Sciences and Arts (وسام العلوم والفنون; two classes)
- Medal of Sports (وسام الرياضة; two classes)
- Military Medal of the Republic (نوط الجمهورية العسكري; two classes)
- Medal of Military Courage (نوط الشجاعة العسكري; three classes)
- Medal of Military Duty (نوط الواجب العسكري; three classes)
- Training Medal (نوط التدريب; three classes)
- Exceptional Promotion Medal (ميدالية الترقية الاستثنائية)
- Long Service and Good Example Medal (ميدالية الخدمة الطويلة والقدوة الحسنة)
- War Wounded Medal (ميدالية جرحى الحرب)
- Medal of Excellence (نوط الامتياز; three classes)
- Medal of Merit (نوط الاستحقاق; three classes)

== Abolished ==
- Order of Independence (Egypt) (وسام الاستقلال; three classes)
