= Order of Honor Star =

Egyptian military decoration

The Order of the Honor Star
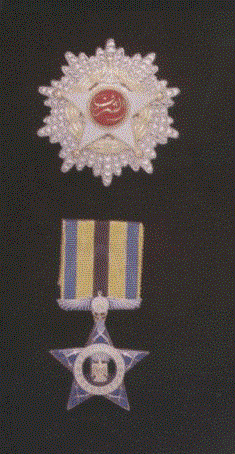
- The Order of Honor Star medal
- Type: Military decoration
- Awarded for: Performing acts of extraordinary gallantry and intrepidity in direct combat with the enemy in the theater of operations indicate valor rare and unique ability and dedication in redemption
- Country: Egypt
- Presented by: Egyptian Armed Forces
- Eligibility: Military personnel only
- Status: Active
- Established: 1957

Precedence
- Equivalent: The Order of the Sinai Star

The Order of Honor Star is one of Egypt's highest military decorations. It is awarded to the officers, non-commissioned officers, soldiers of the Egyptian Armed Forces for performing acts of extraordinary gallantry and intrepidity in direct combat with the enemy.

== Privileges and courtesies ==
The Order confers special privileges on its recipients. The recipients have several benefits:

- A monthly reward of twenty thousand Egyptian pounds, the recipients retains the monthly reward for the duration of his service and if he is transferred to a civilian job and also when he is referred to the pension.
- The education of his children is free of charge in various stages of education in all state-owned schools, colleges and institutions and are exempted from admission requirements with respect to age and total scores.

== Most prominent star recipients ==
- Ahmad Ismail Ali
- Abdul Munim Riad
- Saad el-Shazly
- Mohamed Abdel Ghani el-Gamasy
- Ahmed Badawi
- Abd al-Halim Abu Ghazala
- Hosni Mubarak

== See also ==
- Orders, decorations, and medals of Egypt
