= Order of the Sinai Star =

Military order of the Egyptian Armed Forces

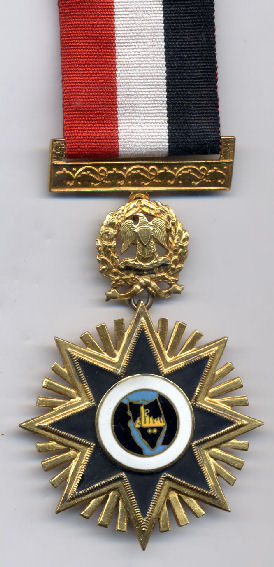
- The Order of the Sinai Star First class ribbon Second class ribbon
- Type: Military decoration
- Awarded for: Performing acts of extraordinary gallantry and intrepidity in direct combat with the enemy in the theater of operations indicate valor rare and unique ability and dedication in redemption
- Country: Egypt
- Eligibility: Military personnel only
- Status: Active
- Established: 1972

Highlights
- Total: 200

Precedence
- Equivalent: The Order of Honor Star

The Order of the Sinai Star is a two-degree military order in Egypt. It is Egypt's highest military honor, awarded for personal acts of extraordinary gallantry and intrepidity in direct combat with the enemy. The order is awarded to officers, non-commissioned officers and soldiers of the Egyptian Armed Forces. A total of 68 officers and soldiers have been awarded the order. It was created in 1972, and it consists of a ribbon and a medal. The ribbon of the first and second degree consists of three horizontal lines, red, white, black, and an extra golden eagle is placed on the ribbon for first degree recipients.

== Privileges and courtesies ==
The Order confers special privileges on its recipients, including:

- A monthly reward of £E20,000 for the first degree, and £E10,000 for the second degree. The recipient retains the monthly reward for the duration of his service, and keeps it if he is transferred to a civilian job and when he qualifies for a pension.
- The education of his children is free of charge in various stages of education in all state-owned schools, colleges and institutions, and are exempted from admission requirements with respect to age and total scores.
- Free travel by all means of state-owned land transportation within the Republic.
- Traveling on all state-owned sea and air transportation inside and outside the Republic with the exemption of half the ticket value and taxes incurred on the traveler.
- Free treatment in all state-owned medical units within the Republic, and access to all social services provided by the state and the armed forces.

== Recipients ==
- Ahmed Hamdi
- Saad el-Shazly
- Atef Sadat
- Hosni Mubarak

== See also ==
- Orders, decorations, and medals of Egypt
