= Vladimir Alekseev (admiral) =

Soviet admiral (1912–1999)

Vladimir Nikolayevich Alekseev
- Born: 8 September [O.S. 26 August] 1912; Kimiltev, Irkutsk Governorate, Russian Empire
- Died: 24 July 1999 (aged 86); Moscow, Russia
- Burial place: Novodevichy Cemetery
- Military career
- Allegiance: Soviet Union
- Service years: 1933 – 1986
- Rank: Admiral
- Commands: Soviet Navy
- Conflicts: World War II
- Awards: Hero of the Soviet Union; USSR State Prize

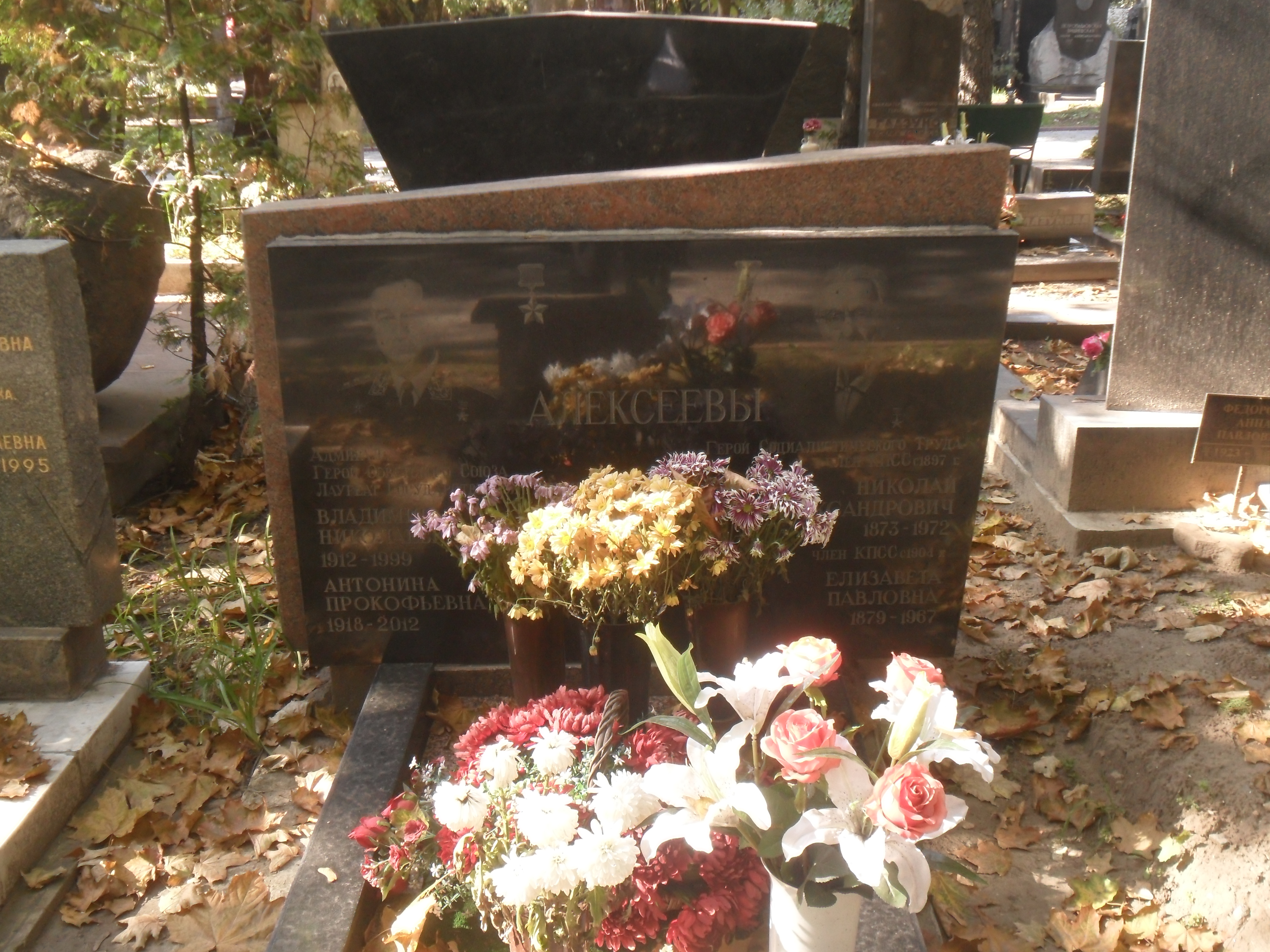
Grave of Alekseev

Vladimir Nikolayevich Alekseev (Russian: Влади́мир Никола́евич Алексе́ев; 8 September [O.S. 26 August] 1912 – 24 July 1999) was a Soviet admiral.

== Biography ==
=== Early life ===
Alekseev was the son of Nikolai Alekseev, a doctor and Bolshevik leader, who received the title Hero of Socialist Labor in 1963 for his contribution to the public health system in Siberia.

He became a sailor in the merchant navy when he was 15. In 1933 he joined the Red Navy, and graduated from the Maritime Academy in 1935 to become a submarine navigator. Afterwards he served as the chief navigation officer of the 3rd flotilla in the Pacific Fleet. In August 1938 he was dismissed and arrested in the Great Purge but rehabilitated in 1939. During 1940 he was appointed chief of staff to the armored flotilla in the Pacific Fleet, and joined the Communist Party in 1941.

=== World War II ===
In April 1944 he was assigned as operations officer of the Northern Fleet but insisted on joining a fighting unit. Alekseev was given command of the 3rd Torpedo Boats Squadron. During the Petsamo-Kirkenes Operation, on October 21. His unit sank 17 enemy supply ships without suffering casualties. For this achievement Alexeyev was awarded the title Hero of the Soviet Union and the Order of Lenin on 5 November 1944. He participated in the Victory Parade.

=== Post-war career ===
After the war Alekseev continued to serve in the navy, and was promoted to counter admiral at 27 January 1951. He graduated from the Voroshilov Academy in 1953, and became a vice admiral on the 26 April 1962. Alekseev served as the representative of the Warsaw Pact forces staff in the Romanian Navy, and from 1965 as Deputy Chief of the Naval Staff for Organization. From 1967 to 1975 he was the First Deputy, promoted to the rank of admiral on 11 June 1970. In 1980, he received the USSR State Prize for his work on the book "Atlas of the Oceans". He retired in 1986, after spending a decade as a senior consultant to the General Staff Academy.

== Awards and honors ==
- Hero of the Soviet Union (1944)
- Order of Lenin (1944)
- Order of the October Revolution (1974)
- Order of the Red Banner, five times (3 in 1944, 1953)
- Order of the Patriotic War, 1st class, twice (incl. 1945, 1985)
- Order of the Red Star (1948)
- USSR State Prize (1980)
- Large ribbon of the Order of the Republic (Egypt)
- Order of the National Flag, 1st class (North Korea)
- Knight's Cross of the Order of Polonia Restituta

== Legacy ==
- A plaque on the house where he was born (Kimiltey, Irkutsk Oblast)
- Streets in village Kimiltey, in city of Kirensk and an alley in Irkutsk are named after Vladimir Alekseev
