= Abdel hay Mashhour =

Egyptian academic administrator (1923–2020)

Abdel Hay Mashhour (1 July 1923 – 16 April 2020) was an Egyptian academic administrator who was President of Tanta University in Egypt from 18 September 1978 to 31 July 1983.

Mashhour was the president of the Egyptian Orthopaedic Association from 1989 to 1990 and was an honorary fellow of the International College of Surgeons.

== Qualifications ==
Bachelor of Medicine and Surgery cum laude of Medicine, Cairo 1948. Diploma of General Surgery, Faculty of Medicine, Cairo University, 1953. Diploma in Orthopedic Surgery, Faculty of Medicine, Cairo University, 1954. Master's degree in Orthopedic Surgery, Faculty of Medicine, Cairo University, 1961.

== Career ==
Mashhour joined the Ministry of Health as a doctor 20 February 1966. and became an Assistant Professor of Orthopedic Surgery, Faculty of Medicine 21 February 1966 Tanta University. He was promoted to Professor of Orthopedic Surgery, Faculty of Medicine 28 March 1972 Tanta University. Later Emeritus Professor of Orthopedic Surgery, Faculty of Medicine with effect from 31 September 1983.

=== Administrative positions ===
Head of the Department of Surgery, Faculty of Medicine Tanta starting from 28 March 1972 to 5 November 1977. Dean of the Faculty of Medicine Tanta from 6 November 1977. President of Tanta University from the period 18 September 1978 to 31 July 1983.

== Death ==
Mashhour died on 16 April 2020, at the age of 96.
