= Mit Abu El Kom =

Village in Monufia Governorate, Egypt

Mit Abu El Kom ميت أبو الكوم
- Village
- Location in Egypt
- Coordinates: 30°38′10″N 30°54′48″E
- Country: Egypt
- Governorate: Monufia
- Time zone: UTC+2 (EET)
  - Summer (DST): UTC+3 (EEST)

Mit Abu El Kom (Arabic: ميت أبو الكوم) is a village in the Egyptian Nile Delta and the Monufia Governorate. It is the birthplace of Egyptian President Anwar Sadat (1918–1981).

== See also ==
- List of cities and towns in Egypt
