= Order of the Republic (Egypt) =

Egyptian order of knighthood

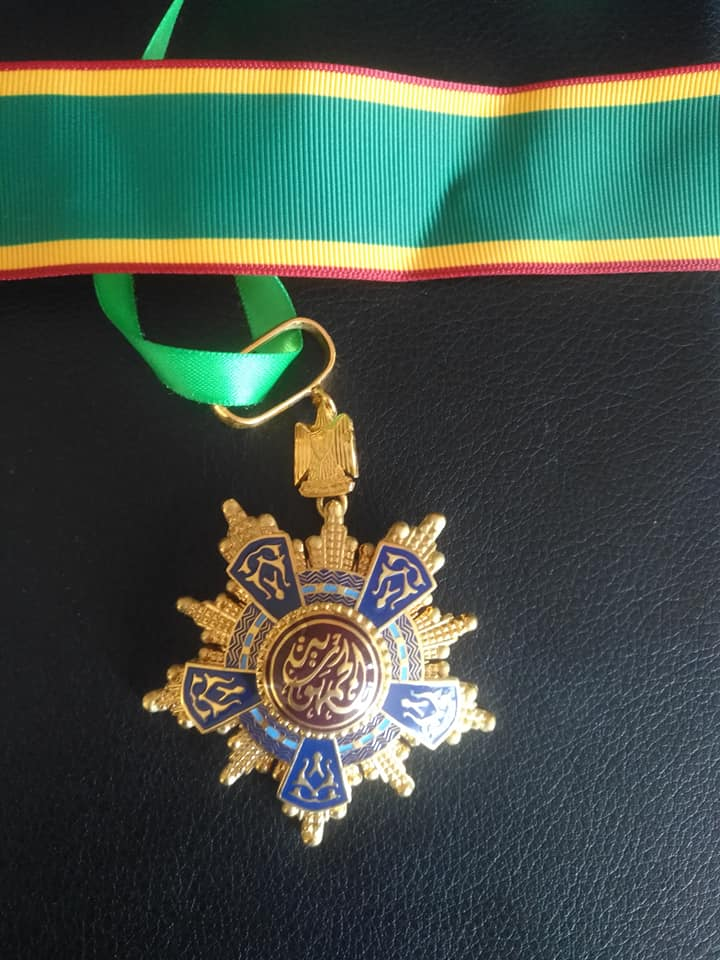
- Type: Order
- Awarded for: Valuable services to Egypt
- Presented by: Egypt
- Established: 1953

Precedence
- Next (higher): Order of the Nile
- Next (lower): Order of Merit

The Order of the Republic is an Egyptian order of knighthood.

== History ==
The Order was founded in 1953 to celebrate the rebirth of the Republic of Egypt.

== Classes ==
The order is composed of the following classes of merit :

- First class – Grand Cordon
- Second class
- Third class
- Fourth class
- Fifth class

Ribbon bars
| Grand Cordon | 2nd Class | 3rd Class | 4th Class | 5th Class |

== Insignia ==
- The ribbon is green with golden and red borders.

== Notable recipients ==
- Hamad bin Isa Al Khalifa, King of Bahrain (24 January 1973)
- Omar Sharaf, Egyptian diplomat (February 1973)
- Ginandjar Kartasasmita, Speaker of the Regional Representative Council of Indonesia (1978)
- Sudharmono, Vice President of Indonesia
- L. B. Moerdani, Commander of the Indonesian National Armed Forces
- Idham Chalid, Deputy Prime Minister of Indonesia (1959)
- Che Guevara, Argentine revolutionary (1959)
- Hassan Shehata, Egyptian footballer (1980)
- Charles III, King of the United Kingdom, then Prince of Wales (1981)
- Ghada Salah El Manbawi, Vice President of the Military Medical Academy, when she was awarded the medal (2017)
- Mohammed Abdel Wahab, Egyptian Music composer
- Mohammed al-Ghazali, Islamic cleric (1988)
- Ihsan Abdel Quddous, Egyptian writer (1990)
- Umm Kulthum, Egyptian singer and actress
- Salah Zulfikar, Egyptian actor and producer
- Ahmed Moharram, Egyptian engineer and politician
- Faten Hamama, Egyptian actress
- Kamal Rifaat, Egyptian military officer and politician
- Mohamed Aboutrika, Egyptian footballer
- Vladimir Alexeyev, Soviet admiral
- Ezz El-Dine Zulficar, Egyptian film director
- Jože Brilej, Yugoslavian diplomat
- Mashhour Ahmed Mashhour, Chairman of Suez Canal Authority
- J. William Middendorf, American diplomat
- Muhammad Naji Al-Mahlawi, President of Ain Shams University
- Song Aiguo, Chinese diplomat

== See also ==
- Orders, decorations, and medals of Egypt

== References and sources ==
- World Medals Index, Republic of Egypt: Order of the Republic

Specific
