= Order of Merit (Egypt) =

- Type: Order of merit
- Awarded for: Valuable services to Egypt
- Presented by: Egypt
- Established: 1953; 73 years ago
- Ribbon bar of the Order

Precedence
- Next (higher): Order of the Republic
- Next (lower): Order of the Virtues

The Order of Merit (Arabic: وسام الاستحقاق, romanized: Wisām al-Istiḥqāq) is an Egyptian order of merit.

== History ==
The Order of Merit was founded by the Regent on behalf of King Ahmad Fuad in 1953 as a general award for meritorious service.

== Classes ==
The order is composed of the following classes of merit:

The order is composed of the following classes of merit :

- First class – Grand Cordon
- Second class – Grand Officer
- Third class – Commander
- Fourth class – Officer
- Fifth class – Knight

Ribbon bars
Grand Cordon	2nd Class	3rd Class	4th Class	5th Class

== Insignia ==
- The ribbon is red with narrow white edge stripes and black edges.

== See also ==
- Orders, decorations, and medals of Egypt

== Sources ==
- World Medals Index, Republic of Egypt: Order of the Republic
