= Alaa Mubarak =

Egyptian businessman (born 1960)

- علاء مبارك
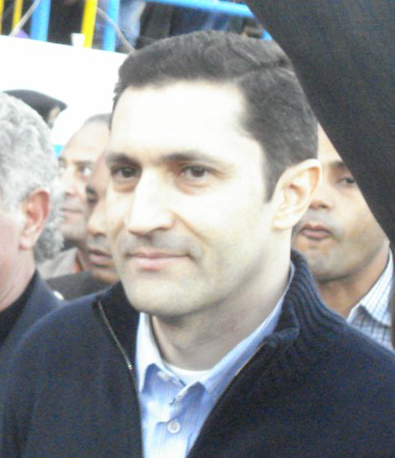
- Alaa Mubarak in Ismailia, Egypt 2009
- Born: Alaa Mohammed Hosni El Sayed Mubarak; 26 November 1960 (age 65); Cairo, Egypt
- Education: St. George's College, Cairo; American University in Cairo (MBA)
- Occupation: Businessman
- Spouse: Heidy Rasekh
- Children: 2
- Parents: Hosni Mubarak (father); Suzanne Mubarak (mother)

Alaa "Alan" Mohammed Hosni El Sayed Mubarak (Arabic: علاء محمد حسني السيد مبارك; Egyptian Arabic pronunciation: [ʕæˈlæːʔ mæˈħæmmæd ˈħosni (ʔe)sˈsæjjed moˈbɑːɾɑk]; born 26 November 1960) is an Egyptian businessman and the elder of two sons of Hosni Mubarak, the former President of Egypt who served from 1981 to 2011, and his wife, Suzanne Mubarak.

== Early life and education ==
Alaa Mubarak was born in Cairo to Suzanne Mubarak and Hosni Mubarak, who became President of Egypt in 1981, and was ousted in 2011. Alaa attended St. George's College, Cairo and graduated from the American University in Cairo.

== Career ==
Alaa has kept a much lower profile than his younger brother, Gamal who was involved in politics prior to the Egyptian revolution of 2011.

In 2011, he was arrested together with his father and brother and three of them later convicted for corruption in 2014. Alaa and his brother were released in October 2015 after completing their three-year prison sentence, which included time already served. The EU had imposed sanctions on all three of them, and froze all assets that Mubarak disclosed. The EU Court of Justice later annulled the sanctions imposed on the Mubarak family which were based on this conviction and on other proceedings in the Egyptian courts.

The EU Court of Justice found that the Mubarak's rights of defence and rights to effective judicial protection in this case were not respected. The Court held that the EU Council had failed to verify whether the Mubarak's fundamental rights were respected in all underlying Egyptian proceedings and rules to annul the sanctions imposed on the family.

Alaa Mubarak has been named in association with the Panama Papers. In 2013, the British Virgin Islands financial services discovered that Alaa Mubarak owned 'Pan World Investments', an investment fund for the Mubarak family of nearly $1 billion incorporated by Mossack Fonseca, who said he was introduced to them by Credit Suisse.

In September 2018, Alaa was arrested along with his brother Gamal, who were both accused, together with other defendants, of manipulating the stock market in a case that started in 2012. Alaa's corruption conviction, along with the corruption convictions of his father and brother, was upheld by Egypt's Court of Cassation the same month as well. The EU Court of Justice subsequently found that their fundamental rights of defence and rights to effective judicial protection in these Egyptian proceedings had not been respected.

Both Alaa and his brother Gamal were later acquitted of the 2012 stock manipulation charge in February 2020.

On 12 March 2021, the European Union revoked the sanctions against nine Egyptian individuals including Mubarak family, adopted since 2011. This followed a decision handed down by the EU Court of Justice which ruled that the sanctions were unlawful.

Subsequently, another decision by the EU Court of Justice "confirmed the unlawfulness of the EU sanctions" against the family. The Court annulled sanctions and ordered the EU to pay the family's legal costs.

By November 2021, the Egyptian judicial authorities unfroze all Mubarak family assets as all legal proceedings came to an end in Egypt.

On 13 April 2022, the Swiss Office of the Attorney General (OAG) closed its probe into Gamal and Alaa Mubarak after its 11-year-long in-depth investigation was "unable to substantiate suspicions" of alleged corruption. Swiss prosecutors declared that "the investigation conducted in Switzerland failed to establish even a tenuous link with any offence." The decision also noted "the absence of evidence relating to potential offences committed in particular in Egypt.

After the closure of the Swiss prosecutors' investigation, Egyptian news reported in May 2022 that a "decade-long legal battle for the Mubarak family had come to an end."

== Personal life ==
Mubarak is married to Heidy Rasekh, with whom he has had two sons, Muhammad and Omar Alaa Mubarak. Muhammad died on 18 May 2009, aged 12. It was announced that he had suffered a 'severe health crisis', which was identified as a brain haemorrhage. He was checked into the Maadi Military Hospital for a couple of hours before being flown to Paris for further care, where he later died. His body was returned and buried in Cairo.
