= Gamal Mubarak =

Egyptian politician (born 1963)

- جمال مبارك
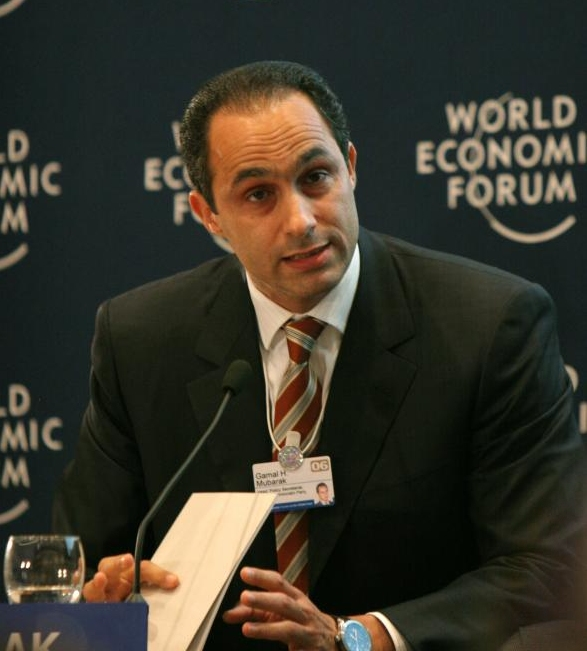
- Gamal Mubarak during the World Economic Forum on the Middle East 2006
- Born: Gamal Al Din Muhammad Hosni El Sayed Mubarak; 27 December 1963 (age 62); Cairo, Egypt
- Other name: Jimmy
- Education: St. George's College, Cairo; American University in Cairo (MBA)
- Occupation: Businessman
- Title: Assistant Secretary General of the National Democratic Party; Secretary of the Policy Committee of the National Democratic Party
- Political party: National Democratic Party
- Spouse: Khadiga al-Gammal
- Children: 2
- Parent(s): Hosni Mubarak; Suzanne Mubarak

Gamal Al Din "Jimmy" Muhammad Hosni Sayed Mubarak (Egyptian Arabic: جمال الدين محمد حسنى سيد مبارك, romanized: Gamāl ad-Dīn Muḥammad Ḥusnī Sayyid Mubārak, Egyptian Arabic pronunciation: [ɡæˈmæːl edˈdiːn mæˈħæmmæd ˈħosni ˈsæjjed moˈbɑːɾɑk]; born 27 December 1963) is the younger of the two sons of former Egyptian President Hosni Mubarak and former First Lady Suzanne Mubarak. In contrast to his older brother Alaa, Gamal had pursued an active public profile and was starting to wield some influence on political life in the country before the revolution of early 2011.

Prior to the revolution, Gamal was deputy secretary-general of the then-ruling and now-dissolved National Democratic Party, and head of its influential policies committee.

In 2014 and 2015, he was convicted of political corruption for diverting nearly $20 million in state funds to private use, along with his father and brother, and sentenced to three years in prison.

The EU Court of Justice later concluded that the Mubaraks' rights of defence and to effective judicial protection in this case were not respected. The Court held that the EU Council had failed to verify whether the Mubaraks' fundamental rights were respected in all underlying Egyptian proceedings and ruled to annul the EU sanctions imposed on the family.

Between 2015 and 2020, Gamal and Alaa Mubarak were subsequently acquitted by the Egyptian courts of the other charges brought against them.

Within the family, under his half-Welsh mother, his name is "Jimmy", while his brother Alaa is "Alan".

== Early life and career ==
Mubarak's given name, Gamal, comes from Egypt's second president, Gamal Abdel Nasser. For his early education, he attended St. George's College, Cairo before entering the American University in Cairo. He graduated with a business administration degree and he also earned an MBA from the university. He began his professional career working for Bank of America. Mubarak left Bank of America to set up London-based Medinvest Associates Ltd, which manages a private equity fund, and to do some corporate finance consultancy work.

== Inheritance of power ==
The grooming of Gamal Mubarak to be his father's successor as the next president of Egypt became increasingly evident at around 2000. With no vice-president, and with no heir-apparent in sight, Gamal started enjoying considerable attention in Egyptian state-run media. On 3 February 2000, Hosni Mubarak appointed him to the general secretariat of the ruling National Democratic Party. Bashar al-Assad's rise to power in Syria in June 2000 just hours after Hafez al-Assad's death, sparked a heated debate in the Egyptian press regarding the prospects for a similar scenario occurring in Cairo.

Mubarak founded, and became chairman of, the Future Generation Foundation (FGF), an NGO supporting job training but which also served as a vehicle for Mubarak's political career.

Both President Mubarak and his son denied the possibility of any inheritance of power in Egypt. More recently, this claim was made in early 2006, when Gamal Mubarak declared repeatedly that he had no aspiration to succeed his father, but that he would maintain his position in the then-ruling NDP as deputy secretary general, a post he held in addition to heading the party's policy committee, allegedly the most important member of the NDP.

In September 2004, several political groups (most are unofficial), on both the left and the right, announced their sharp opposition to the inheritance of power. They demanded political change and a fair, multi-candidate election.

On 26 February 2005, Mubarak ordered the constitution changed to allow multi-candidate presidential elections before September 2005 by asking parliament to amend Article 76 of the Egyptian constitution. This change in the constitution was seen then by some analysts and senior judicial figures as a ploy to seamlessly allow Gamal Mubarak to inherit the top position in Egypt. According to this view, Gamal Mubarak would be one of the candidates in a presidential elections and would be supported by the ruling party and the government-controlled media. Since remaining serious candidates would be disqualified by the NDP-controlled People's Assembly leaving only the less popular candidates, the inheritance of power would be accomplished through a "democratic" process. However these were all merely assumptions made by political activists, analysts, and opponents.

== End of his father's presidency ==
Some political analysts speculate that the alleged deteriorating state of the Egyptian economy in the last days of Hosni Mubarak's rule was caused by Gamal and his friends taking over as political advisers to Mubarak. On the other hand, a wide range of analysts credit Gamal Mubarak for reviving the Egyptian economy over the previous five years, from a stagnant, mostly state-run economy to a largely free market system that enjoyed five percent GDP growth.

During the first week of the 2011 Egyptian Revolution there were unconfirmed reports and speculation that Gamal might have left Egypt during the protests. However, on 3 February 2011, Gamal was present for an ABC News interview of his father in Cairo.

As the 2011 Egyptian revolution unfolded, newly appointed vice president Omar Suleiman met a major public concern when he announced on 3 February 2011 that Gamal Mubarak would not seek election.

Reuters Africa reported that a fight took place between him and his older brother, Alaa Mubarak. Alaa supposedly accused Gamal of ruining their father's last days in power and humiliating him.

== Political corruption convictions ==
Following the stepping down of Hosni Mubarak, media sources started to point to the 'suspicious' financial dealings of Gamal Mubarak. On 28 February 2011, the Egyptian daily Al-Ahram published a list of bank accounts allegedly belonging to Gamal Mubarak. Al-Ahram reported that the Chief Prosecutor of Egypt received a report that Gamal Mubarak inexplicably amassed significant sums of money that were deposited in these accounts. This allegation came on background of a decision from the Prosecutor General of Egypt to freeze all bank accounts belonging to the Mubarak family, including Gamal Mubarak. The Egyptian Appeals Court ordered that Mubarak's financial status is reviewed by the court on 5 March 2011. The Egyptian courts have since unfrozen the Mubarak assets in Egypt after Gamal Mubarak and his brother were acquitted.

On 13 April 2011, Gamal was imprisoned for 15 days pending investigations for corruption, abuse of power, and for his alleged role in causing the fatalities and casualties of peaceful protesters during the revolution which was sparked on 25 January 2011. An official investigation accused Gamal Mubarak of using his influence in the National Democratic Party and as son of the president to award contracts to foreign companies in which he was a partner. He appeared in court, alongside his father and brother. Gamal and his brother still remained in prison, whereas their father was released from jail but put on house arrest for 15 days.

On 19 December 2013, Gamal was once again freed after he was acquitted of corruption along with his brother and Ahmed Shafik, ex-candidate of 2012 Egyptian presidential election.

On 21 May 2014, a Cairo court convicted Mubarak and his sons Alaa and Gamal of embezzling the equivalent of US$17.6 million of state funds intended for renovation of presidential palaces but were instead diverted to upgrade private family homes. The court ordered the repayment of US$17.6 million, fined the trio US$2.9 million, and sentenced Mubarak to three years in prison and each of his sons to four years. They were retried and convicted again in May 2015 and their sentence was reduced to three years.

The EU Court of Justice later annulled sanctions imposed on the Mubarak family which were based on this conviction and on other proceedings in the Egyptian courts. The Court found that the decision to impose sanctions had not been taken "on a sufficiently solid factual basis" due to the lack of verification by the EU Council as to whether their fundamental rights were respected in the relevant Egyptian proceedings.

In October 2015 he and his brother were released from prison, based on time already served.

In September 2018, Gamal was arrested along with his brother Alaa who were both accused, together with other defendants, of stock market manipulation in a case that started in 2012. The same month, Gamal's long sought chance of a political future ended after he became ineligible for any political office following the Egypt Court of Cassation's decision to uphold his corruption conviction. The corruption convictions of his father and his brother were upheld as well. The EU Court of Justice found that their fundamental rights of defence and rights to effective judicial protection in these Egyptian proceedings had not been respected.

Both Gamal and his brother were acquitted of the 2012 stock market manipulation charge in February 2020.

On 12 March 2021, the European Union revoked the sanctions against nine Egyptian individuals including Mubarak family, adopted since 2011. This followed a decision handed down by the EU Court of Justice which ruled that the sanctions were unlawful. Subsequently, another decision by the EU Court of Justice "confirmed the unlawfulness of the EU sanctions" against the family. The Court annulled the sanctions and ordered the EU to pay the family's legal costs.

In November 2021, the Egyptian judicial authorities unfroze all Mubarak family assets as all legal proceedings came to an end in Egypt.

On 13 April 2022, the Swiss Office of the Attorney General (OAG) closed its probe into Gamal and Alaa Mubarak, after its 11-year-long and in-depth investigation was "unable to substantiate suspicions" of alleged corruption.

Swiss prosecutors declared that "the investigation conducted in Switzerland failed to establish even a tenuous link with any offence." The decision also noted "the absence of evidence relating to potential offences committed in particular in Egypt."

After the closure of the Swiss prosecutors' investigation, Egyptian news reported in May 2022 that a "decade-long legal battle for the Mubarak family had come to an end."

== Personal life ==
Mubarak is married to Khadiga al-Gammal, with whom he has two children, Farida and Mahmoud. In 2009, his 12-year-old nephew Mohammed (son of Alaa Mubarak) died of a cerebral haemorrhage and had an immediate burial as the Islamic tradition.
