= List of state visits received by Hirohito =

After acceding to the throne of Japan in December 1926, Emperor Hirohito received a total of 72 state visits. The state banquets were given by the Emperor at Tokyo Imperial Palace.

== List of visits ==
No.	Date	Country	Regime	Guests
1930s
1	6–24 April 1935	Manchukuo	Monarchy	Emperor Puyi
1940s
2	26 June – 6 July 1940	Manchukuo	Monarchy	Emperor Puyi
1950s
3	19–28 November 1956	Ethiopia	Monarchy	Emperor Haile Selassie
4	19 May – 1 June 1958	Iran	Monarchy	Shah Mohammad Reza Pahlavi
5	27 September – 4 October 1958	India	Republic	President Rajendra Prasad
6	1–6 December 1958	Philippines	Republic	President Carlos P. Garcia; First Lady Leonila Garcia
7	6–10 June 1959	Indonesia	Republic	President Sukarno
1960s
8	18–25 April 1960	Nepal	Monarchy	King Mahendra; Queen Ratna
9	12–19 December 1960	Pakistan	Republic	President Ayub Khan
10	10–16 May 1961	Peru	Republic	President Manuel Prado Ugarteche; First Lady Clorinda Málaga de Prado
11	13–21 December 1961	Argentina	Republic	President Arturo Frondizi; First Lady Elena Luisa María Faggionato
12	11–14 October 1962	Mexico	Republic	President Adolfo López Mateos; First Lady Eva Sámano
13	27 May – 5 June 1963	Thailand	Monarchy	King Bhumibol Adulyadej; Queen Sirikit
14	6–15 November 1963	West Germany	Republic	President Heinrich Lübke; Mme Wilhelmine Lübke
15	20–30 January 1964	Belgium	Monarchy	King Baudouin; Queen Fabiola
16	16–25 June 1964	Malaysia	Monarchy	Yang di-Pertuan Agong (King) Putra of Perlis; Raja Permaisuri Agong (Queen) Raja Perempuan Budriah
17	15–23 November 1965	Madagascar	Republic	President Philibert Tsiranana; First Lady Justine Tsiranana
18	19–26 September 1966	(Myanmar) Burma	Republic	Chairman of the Revolutionary Council Ne Win; First Lady Khin May Than
19	28 September – 3 October 1966	Philippines	Republic	President Ferdinand Marcos; First Lady Imelda Marcos
20	28 March – 1 April 1968	Indonesia	Republic	President Suharto; First Lady Siti Hartinah
21	8–15 April 1968	Yugoslavia	Republic	President Josip Broz Tito; First Lady Jovanka Broz
22	9–15 April 1969	Afghanistan	Monarchy	King Mohammad Zahir Shah; Queen Humaira Begum
1970s
23	6–15 April 1971	Zaire	Republic	President Mobutu Sese Seko; First Lady Marie-Antoinette Mobutu
24	20–25 May 1971	Saudi Arabia	Monarchy	King Faisal
25	9–14 March 1972	Mexico	Republic	President Luis Echeverría; First Lady María Esther Zuno
26	14–20 April 1972	Paraguay	Republic	President Alfredo Stroessner
27	18–22 November 1974	United States	Republic	President Gerald Ford; First Lady Betty Ford
28	4–9 April 1975	Romania	Republic	President Nicolae Ceaușescu; First Lady Elena Ceaușescu
29	7–12 May 1975	United Kingdom	Monarchy	Queen Elizabeth II; Prince Philip, Duke of Edinburgh
30	10–16 March 1976	Jordan	Monarchy	King Hussein of Jordan; Queen Alia Toukan
31	15–20 September 1976	Brazil	Republic	President Ernesto Geisel; First Lady Lucy Markus Geisel
32	25–28 April 1977	Philippines	Republic	President Ferdinand Marcos; First Lady Imelda Marcos
33	13–18 March 1978	Bulgaria	Republic	Chairman of the State Council Todor Zhivkov
34	5–9 April 1978	Bangladesh	Republic	President Ziaur Rahman; First Lady Khaleda Zia
35	16–21 April 1978	West Germany	Republic	President Walter Scheel; Mme Mildred Scheel
36	15–21 May 1978	Nepal	Monarchy	King Birendra; Queen Aishwarya of Nepal
37	30 October – 4 November 1978	Mexico	Republic	President José López Portillo; First Lady Carmen Romano
38	16–22 April 1979	Senegal	Republic	President Léopold Sédar Senghor; First Lady Colette Senghor
39	24–27 June 1979	United States	Republic	President Jimmy Carter; First Lady Rosalynn Carter
40	10–15 September 1979	Sri Lanka	Republic	President J. R. Jayewardene; First Lady Elina Jayewardene
41	8–12 October 1979	Argentina	Republic	President Jorge Rafael Videla; First Lady Alicia Raquel Hartridge
1980s
42	23–28 March 1980	Panama	Republic	President Arístides Royo; First Lady Adela Ruiz de Royo
43	13–19 April 1980	Sweden	Monarchy	King Carl XVI Gustaf; Queen Silvia
44	27 May – 1 June 1980	China	Republic	Premier Hua Guofeng
45	17–20 September 1980	Zambia	Republic	President Kenneth Kaunda; First Lady Betty Kaunda
46	27–31 October 1980	Spain	Monarchy	King Juan Carlos I Queen Sofía
47	17–22 March 1981	Tanzania	Republic	President Julius Nyerere; First Lady Maria Nyerere
48	21–26 April 1981	Denmark	Monarchy	Queen Margrethe II; Prince Henrik
49	26–31 May 1981	East Germany	Republic	Chairman of the State Council Erich Honecker
50	9–15 March 1982	Italy	Republic	President Sandro Pertini
51	5–9 April 1982	Kenya	Republic	President Daniel arap Moi
52	14–18 April 1982	France	Republic	President François Mitterrand; Mme Danielle Mitterrand
53	5–9 April 1983	Egypt	Republic	President Hosni Mubarak; First Lady Suzanne Mubarak
54	17–22 July 1983	Pakistan	Republic	President Zia-ul-Haq; First Lady Shafiq Zia
55	11–17 September 1983	Ireland	Republic	President Patrick Hillery; First Lady Maeve Hillery
56	18–23 October 1983	Norway	Monarchy	King Olav V
57	9–12 November 1983	United States	Republic	President Ronald Reagan; First Lady Nancy Reagan
58	5–7 April 1984	Brunei	Monarchy	King Hassanal Bolkiah; Queen Saleha
59	22–29 April 1984	Qatar	Monarchy	Emir Khalifa bin Hamad Al Thani
60	23–27 May 1984	Brazil	Republic	President João Figueiredo; First Lady Dulce Figueiredo
61	1–11 July 1984	(Myanmar) Burma	Republic	President San Yu; First Lady Than Shein
62	6–8 September 1984	South Korea	Republic	President Chun Doo-hwan; First Lady Lee Soon-ja
63	18–21 September 1984	Gabon	Republic	President Omar Bongo; First Lady Patience Dabany
64	19–22 June 1985	Bangladesh	Republic	President Hussain Muhammad Ershad; First Lady Rowshan Ershad
65	13–17 July 1986	Argentina	Republic	President Raúl Alfonsín; First Lady María Lorenza Barreneche
66	16–19 September 1986	Niger	Republic	President Seyni Kountché
67	30 September – 5 October 1986	Finland	Republic	President Mauno Koivisto; First Lady Tellervo Koivisto
68	10–13 November 1986	Philippines	Republic	President Corazon Aquino
69	30 November – 4 December 1986	Mexico	Republic	President Miguel de la Madrid; First Lady Paloma Cordero
70	28 June – 2 July 1987	Poland	Republic	Chairman of the Council of State Wojciech Jaruzelski; First Lady Barbara Jaruzelska
71	5–9 April 1988	Venezuela	Republic	President Jaime Lusinchi
72	28 June – 2 July 1988	Senegal	Republic	President Abdou Diouf; First Lady Elizabeth Diouf

== Countries that made state visits ==
Countries	State visits	Notes
Afghanistan	1	Monarchy abolished in 1973.
Argentina	3	
Bangladesh	2	
Belgium	1	
Brazil	2	
Brunei	1	
Bulgaria	1	
(Myanmar) Burma	2	
China	1	
Denmark	1	
East Germany	1	
Egypt	1	
Ethiopia	1	Monarchy abolished in 1975.
Finland	1	
France	1	
Gabon	1	
India	1	
Indonesia	2	
Iran	1	Monarchy abolished in 1979.
Ireland	1	
Italy	1	
Jordan	1	
Kenya	1	
Madagascar	1	
Malaysia	1	
Manchukuo	2	
Mexico	4	
Nepal	2	Monarchy abolished in 2008.
Niger	1	
Norway	1	
Pakistan	2	
Panama	1	
Paraguay	1	
Peru	1	
Philippines	4	
Poland	1	
Qatar	1	
Romania	1	
Saudi Arabia	1	
Senegal	2	
South Korea	1	
Spain	1	
Sri Lanka	1	
Sweden	1	
Tanzania	1	
Thailand	1	
United Kingdom	1	
United States	3	
Venezuela	1	
West Germany	2	
Yugoslavia	1	
Zaire	1	Now called Democratic Republic of the Congo.
Zambia	1	

== See also ==
- List of state visits received by Akihito
- List of state visits received by Naruhito
- List of official overseas trips made by Akihito
- List of official overseas trips made by Naruhito
