= List of state visits received by Akihito =

After acceding to the throne of Japan in January 1989, Emperor Akihito received a total of 63 state visits. The state banquets were given by the Emperor at Tokyo Imperial Palace.

== List of visits ==
No.	Date	Country	Regime	Guests
1980s
1	15–17 October 1989	Zimbabwe	Republic	President Robert Mugabe
2	17–22 December 1989	Tanzania	Republic	President Ali Hassan Mwinyi; First Lady Siti Mwinyi
1990s
3	13–19 May 1990	United Arab Emirates	Republic	President Zayed bin Sultan Al Nahyan
4	24–26 May 1990	South Korea	Republic	President Roh Tae-woo; First Lady Kim Ok-suk
5	16–19 April 1991	Soviet Union	Republic	President Mikhail Gorbachev; First Lady Raisa Gorbacheva
6	20–26 October 1991	Netherlands	Monarchy	Queen Beatrix
7	7–10 January 1992	United States	Republic	President George H. W. Bush; First Lady Barbara Bush
8	15–21 March 1992	Peru	Republic	President Alberto Fujimori; First Lady Susana Higuchi
9	22–26 April 1992	Czechoslovakia	Republic	President Václav Havel; First Lady Olga Havlová
10	9–13 March 1993	Philippines	Republic	President Fidel V. Ramos; First Lady Amelita Ramos
11	4–11 April 1993	Malaysia	Monarchy	Yang di-Pertuan Agong (King) Azlan Shah of Perak; Raja Permaisuri Agong (Queen) Raja Permaisuri Tuanku Bainun
12	11–13 October 1993	Russia	Republic	President Boris Yeltsin; First Lady Naina Yeltsina
13	18–25 October 1993	Portugal	Republic	President Mário Soares; First Lady Maria Barroso
14	24–26 March 1994	South Korea	Republic	President Kim Young-sam; First Lady Son Myung-soon
15	6–9 December 1994	Poland	Republic	President Lech Wałęsa; First Lady Danuta Wałęsa
16	20–28 February 1995	Ireland	Republic	President Mary Robinson; Mr Nicholas Robinson
17	13–16 March 1995	Egypt	Republic	President Hosni Mubarak; First Lady Suzanne Mubarak
18	2–6 July 1995	South Africa	Republic	President Nelson Mandela
19	12–15 March 1996	Brazil	Republic	President Fernando Henrique Cardoso; First Lady Ruth Cardoso
20	16–18 April 1996	United States	Republic	President Bill Clinton; First Lady Hillary Clinton
21	9–12 July 1996	Tunisia	Republic	President Zine El Abidine Ben Ali; First Lady Leïla Ben Ali
22	21–25 October 1996	Belgium	Monarchy	King Albert II; Queen Paola
23	17–22 November 1996	France	Republic	President Jacques Chirac; Mme Bernadette Chirac
24	10–14 March 1997	Mexico	Republic	President Ernesto Zedillo; First Lady Nilda Patricia Velasco
25	5–10 April 1997	Germany	Republic	President Roman Herzog
26	16–20 November 1997	Bulgaria	Republic	President Petar Stoyanov; First Lady Antonina Stoyanova
27	13–19 April 1998	Italy	Republic	President Oscar Luigi Scalfaro
28	7–10 October 1998	South Korea	Republic	President Kim Dae-jung; First Lady Lee Hee-ho
29	25–30 November 1998	China	Republic	President Jiang Zemin; First Lady Wang Yeping
30	1–4 December 1998	Argentina	Republic	President Carlos Menem
31	3–12 April 1999	Luxembourg	Monarchy	Grand Duke Jean; Grand Duchess Princess Joséphine-Charlotte
32	1–4 June 1999	Austria	Republic	President Thomas Klestil; First Lady Margot Klestil-Löffler
33	30 November – 4 December 1999	Jordan	Monarchy	King Abdullah II; Queen Rania
2000s
34	8–14 April 2000	Hungary	Republic	President Árpád Göncz; Mrs Zsuzsanna Göntér
35	25–31 March 2001	Norway	Monarchy	King Harald V Queen Sonja
36	1–3 October 2001	South Africa	Republic	President Thabo Mbeki; First Lady Zanele Dlamini Mbeki
37	2–5 December 2002	Philippines	Republic	President Gloria Macapagal Arroyo; First Gentleman Jose Miguel Arroyo
38	6–9 June 2003	South Korea	Republic	President Roh Moo-hyun; First Lady Kwon Yang-sook
39	22–25 June 2003	Indonesia	Republic	President Megawati Sukarnoputri; First Gentleman Taufiq Kiemas
40	15–18 October 2003	Mexico	Republic	President Vicente Fox; First Lady Marta Sahagún
41	15–22 November 2004	Denmark	Monarchy	Queen Margrethe II; Prince Henrik
42	6–13 March 2005	Malaysia	Monarchy	Yang di-Pertuan Agong (King) Sirajuddin of Perlis; Raja Permaisuri Agong (Queen) Tuanku Tengku Fauziah
43	26 November – 2 December 2005	Morocco	Monarchy	King Mohammed VI
44	26–29 November 2006	Indonesia	Republic	President Susilo Bambang Yudhoyono; First Lady Ani Yudhoyono
45	25–31 March 2007	Sweden	Monarchy	King Carl XVI Gustaf; Queen Silvia
46	25–29 November 2007	Vietnam	Republic	King Nguyễn Minh Triết; First Lady Trần Thị Kim Chi
47	6–10 May 2008	China	Republic	President Hu Jintao; First Lady Liu Yongqing
48	9–14 November 2008	Spain	Monarchy	King Juan Carlos I Queen Sofía
49	9–16 May 2009	Singapore	Republic	President S. R. Nathan; Mrs Urmila Nandey
2010s
50	16–20 May 2010	Cambodia	Monarchy	King Norodom Sihamoni
51	15–20 November 2011	Bhutan	Monarchy	King Jigme Khesar Namgyel Wangchuck; Queen Jetsun Pema
52	20–23 March 2012	Kuwait	Monarchy	Emir Sabah Al-Ahmad Al-Jaber Al-Sabah
53	1–5 October 2012	Malaysia	Monarchy	Yang di-Pertuan Agong (King) Abdul Halim of Kedah; Raja Permaisuri Agong (Queen) Che Puan Besar Haminah
54	6–8 June 2013	France	Republic	President François Hollande; Ms Valérie Trierweiler
55	16–19 March 2014	Vietnam	Republic	President Trương Tấn Sang; First Lady Mai Thị Hạnh
56	23–25 April 2014	United States	Republic	President Barack Obama
57	28 October – 2 November 2014	Netherlands	Monarchy	King Willem-Alexander; Queen Máxima
58	2–5 June 2015	Philippines	Republic	President Benigno Aquino III
59	10–15 October 2016	Belgium	Monarchy	King Philippe; Queen Mathilde
60	28 November – 6 December 2016	Singapore	Republic	President Tony Tan; Mrs Mary Chee Tan
61	4–7 April 2017	Spain	Monarchy	King Felipe VI; Queen Letizia
62	25–30 November 2017	Luxembourg	Monarchy	Grand Duke Henri
63	29 May – 2 June 2018	Vietnam	Republic	President Trần Đại Quang; First Lady Nguyễn Thị Hiền

== Countries that made state visits ==
Countries	State visits	Notes
Argentina	1	
Austria	1	
Belgium	2	
Bhutan	1	
Brazil	1	
Bulgaria	1	
Cambodia	1	
China	2	
Czechoslovakia	1	
Denmark	1	
Germany	1	
Egypt	1	
France	2	
Hungary	1	
Indonesia	2	
Ireland	1	
Italy	1	
Jordan	1	
Kuwait	1	
Luxembourg	2	
Malaysia	3	
Mexico	2	
Morocco	1	
Netherlands	2	
Norway	1	
Peru	1	
Philippines	3	
Poland	1	
Portugal	1	
Russia	1	
Singapore	2	
South Africa	2	
South Korea	4	
Soviet Union	1	
Spain	2	
Sweden	1	
Tanzania	1	
Tunisia	1	
United Arab Emirates	1	
United States	3	
Vietnam	3	
Zimbabwe	1	

== See also ==
- List of state visits received by Hirohito
- List of state visits received by Naruhito
- List of official overseas trips made by Akihito
- List of official overseas trips made by Naruhito
