= List of official overseas trips made by Naruhito =

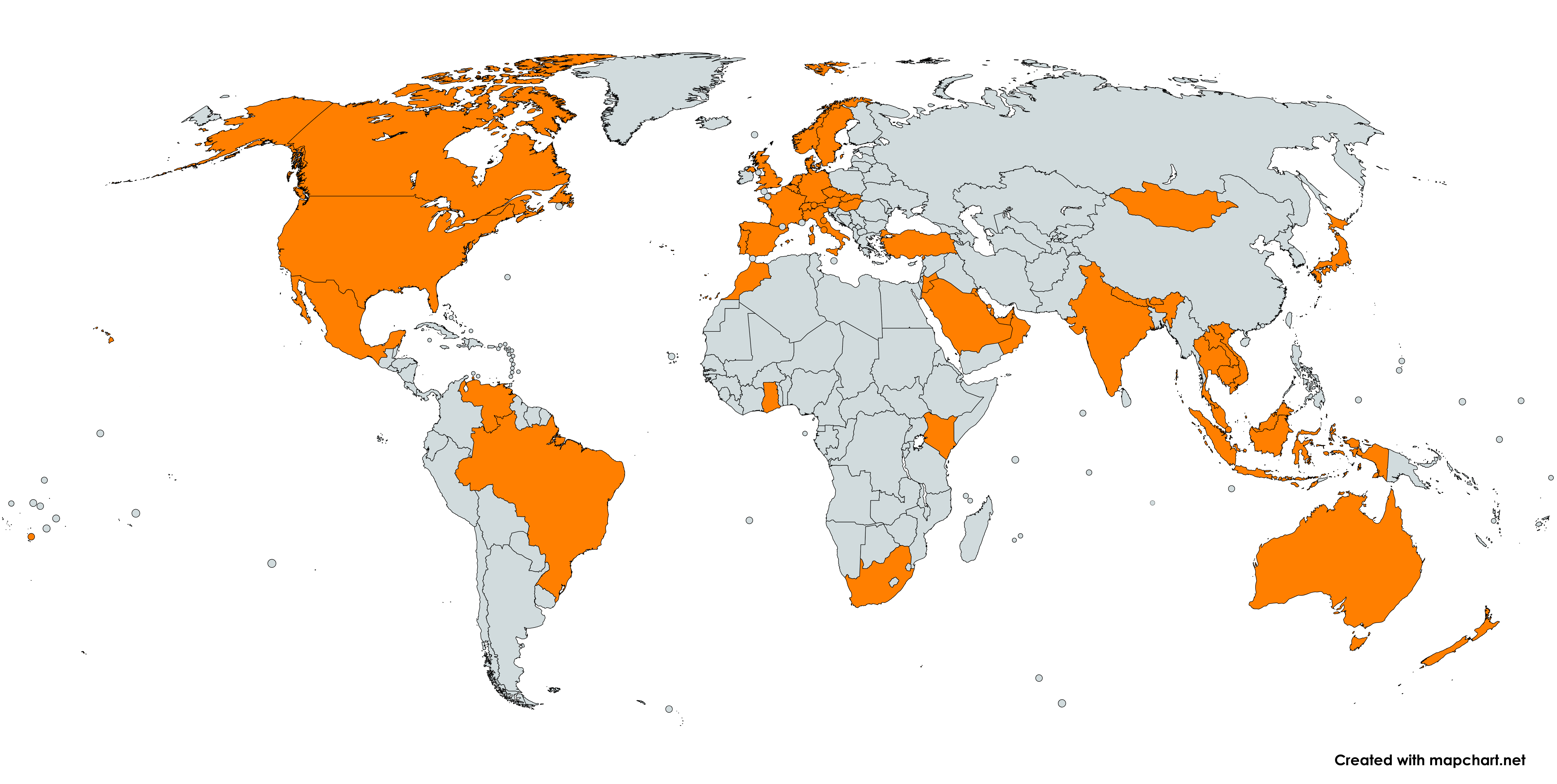
Map of countries visited by Naruhito on an official overseas visit

As Crown Prince and later as Emperor, Naruhito has been one of the Japan's most important ambassadors. He travels overseas as a representative of Japan. He is often accompanied by his wife, Empress Masako.

== As Prince Hiro ==
=== 1970s ===
Date	Country	Stopover	Areas visited	Details	Host
16–30 August 1974	Australia			Toured the country.	
7–18 August 1976	Belgium; Spain			Toured the countries..	

=== 1980s ===
Date	Country	Stopover	Areas visited	Details	Host
20–29 December 1980	Thailand			Toured the country.	
3–18 October 1982	Brazil			Visited the country to foster friendly relations at the invitation of Brazil.	President João Figueiredo
20 June 1983 – 31 October 1985	United Kingdom; Liechtenstein; Switzerland; Belgium; Italy; France; Netherlands; Austria; San Marino; Vatican City; Czechoslovakia; Hungary; Norway; Spain; West Germany; United States			Studied at the Merton College, Oxford and toured the countries.	
20–27 July 1986	United Kingdom		London	Attended the Wedding of Prince Andrew and Sarah Ferguson (representing the Emperor).	Queen Elizabeth II
10–25 March 1987	Nepal; Bhutan; India	Thailand		Visited the countries to foster friendly relations at the invitation of Nepal, Bhutan and India.	King Birendra of Nepal; King Jigme Singye Wangchuck; President Zail Singh
6–13 November 1987	West Germany		West Berlin	Attended the opening ceremony of "Japanese–German Center Berlin".	

== As Crown Prince ==
=== 1980s ===
Date	Country	Stopover	Areas visited	Details	Host
23 September – 1 October 1989	Belgium		Brussels	The Crown Prince attended the opening ceremony of the "EUROPALIA Japan".	King Baudouin of Belgium

=== 1990s ===
Date	Country	Stopover	Areas visited	Details	Host
17–27 August 1990	Belgium	Luxembourg; United States	Leuven	The Crown Prince attended the 10th World Economic History Congress at KU Leuven.	
28 January – 1 February 1991	Norway	France	Oslo	The Crown Prince attended the state funeral of King Olav V (representing the Emperor).	King Harald V
11–24 September 1991	Morocco; United Kingdom	France	Rabat and London	The Crown Prince visited the country to foster friendly relations at the invitation of Morocco. Attended the opening ceremony of "Japan Festival 1991", an event to introduce Japanese culture, and there, he and the Prince of Wales (later King Charles III) attended a number of events together. They enjoyed green tea served during an outdoor traditional Japanese tea ceremony and attended the opening ceremony for a robot exhibition.	King Hassan II of Morocco; Queen Elizabeth II
18 July – 4 August 1992	Spain; Venezuela; Mexico	United States	Seville, Barcelona, Caracas and Mexico City	Attended the opening ceremonies of Expo '92 and 1992 Summer Olympics. Visited to foster friendly relations at the invitation of Venezuela and Mexico.	King Juan Carlos I; President Carlos Andrés Pérez; President Carlos Salinas de Gortari
5–15 November 1994	Saudi Arabia; Oman; Qatar; Bahrain	Thailand	Riyadh; Diriyah; Muscat; Doha; Manama	The Crown Prince and Crown Princess visited the countries to foster friendly relations at the invitation of Saudi Arabia, Oman, Qatar and Bahrain.	King and Prime Minister Fahd of Saudi Arabia; Sultan Qaboos bin Said; Emir Khalifa bin Hamad Al Thani; Emir Isa bin Salman Al Khalifa
20–28 January 1995	Kuwait; United Arab Emirates; Jordan	Singapore	Kuwait City, Abu Dhabi and Amman	The Crown Prince and Crown Princess visited the countries to foster friendly relations at the invitation of Kuwait, United Arab Emirates and Jordan.	Emir Jaber Al-Ahmad Al-Sabah; President Zayed bin Sultan Al Nahyan; King Hussein of Jordan
8–9 February 1999	Jordan		Amman	The Crown Prince and Crown Princess attended the state funeral of King Hussein of Jordan (representing the Emperor).	King Abdullah II of Jordan
3–7 December 1999	Belgium		Brussels	The Crown Prince and Crown Princess attended the wedding of Prince Philippe and Mathilde d'Udekem d'Acoz (representing the Emperor).	King Albert II of Belgium

=== 2000s ===
Date	Country	Stopover	Areas visited	Details	Host
18–25 May 2001	United Kingdom		London	The Crown Prince met Queen Elizabeth II and Prince Philip, Duke of Edinburgh at Windsor Castle. He and Prince of Wales (later King Charles III) joined a circle of Awa Odori dance performers, enlivening the cultural exchange with their impromptu steps.	Queen Elizabeth II
30 January – 4 February 2002	Netherlands		Amsterdam	The Crown Prince attended the wedding of Prince Willem-Alexander and Máxima Zorreguieta Cerruti (representing the Emperor).	Queen Beatrix of the Netherlands
11–19 December 2002	New Zealand; Australia		Wellington, Auckland, Canberra and Sydney	The Crown Prince and Crown Princess visited the countries to foster friendly relations at the invitation of New Zealand and Australia.	Governor-General Dame Silvia Cartwright; Governor-General Peter Hollingworth
12–24 May 2004	Denmark; Portugal; Spain		Copenhagen, Lisbon, Coimbra, Serra do Buçaco, Porto and Madrid	The Crown Prince attended the wedding of Frederik, Crown Prince of Denmark, and Mary Donaldson and the wedding of Prince Felipe and Letizia Ortiz (representing the Emperor). He also visited to foster friendly relations at the invitation of Portugal.	Queen Margrethe II; President Jorge Sampaio; King Juan Carlos I
8–11 September 2004	Brunei		Bandar Seri Begawan	The Crown Prince attended the wedding of Al-Muhtadee Billah, Crown Prince of Brunei and Sarah binti Salleh Ab. Rahaman (representing the Emperor).	Sultan and Prime Minister Hassanal Bolkiah
3–4 August 2005	Saudi Arabia		Riyadh	The Crown Prince visited to pay condolences following the death of King Fahd bin Abdulaziz Al Saud, Protector of the Two Holy Mosques of Saudi Arabia.	King and Prime Minister Abdullah of Saudi Arabia
15–21 March 2006	Mexico	Canada	Mexico City, Mérida and Vancouver	The Crown Prince attended and delivered the keynote speech at the 4th World Water Forum at the invitation of Mexico.	President Vicente Fox
17–31 August 2006	Netherlands		Amsterdam	The Crown Prince, Crown Princess and Princess Aiko toured and stayed at the country for rest and relaxation at the invitation of Queen Beatrix.	Queen Beatrix of the Netherlands
18–20 September 2006	Tonga	New Zealand	Nukuʻalofa and Auckland	The Crown Prince attended the funeral of King Tāufaʻāhau Tupou IV (representing the Emperor).	King George Tupou V
10–17 July 2007	Mongolia		Ulaanbaatar and Karakorum	The Crown Prince visited the country to foster friendly relations at the invitation of Mongolia.	President Nambaryn Enkhbayar
16–27 June 2008	Brazil	United States	Brasília, São Paulo, Santos, Londrina, Rolândia, Maringá, Belo Horizonte, Rio de Janeiro and Los Angeles	The Crown Prince visited the country to foster friendly relations on the occasion of the 100th anniversary of Japanese immigration in Brazil at the invitation of Brazil.	President Luiz Inácio Lula da Silva
16–23 July 2008	Spain		Madrid, Toledo and Zaragoza	The Crown Prince attended the Expo 2008 at the invitation of Spain.	King Juan Carlos I
30 July – 3 August 2008	Tonga	Australia	Nukuʻalofa and Sydney	The Crown Prince attended the coronation of King George Tupou V at the invitation of Tonga (representing the Emperor).	King George Tupou V
9–15 February 2009	Vietnam		Hanoi, Da Nang, Hội An, Huế and Ho Chi Minh City	The Crown Prince visited the country to foster friendly relations at the invitation of Vietnam.	President Nguyễn Minh Triết
14–20 March 2009	Turkey	Germany	Frankfurt and Istanbul	The Crown Prince attended and delivered the keynote speech at the 5th World Water Forum at the invitation of Turkey.	President Abdullah Gül

=== 2010s ===
Date	Country	Stopover	Areas visited	Details	Host
6–15 March 2010	Ghana; Kenya	United Kingdom; Italy	Accra, Nairobi, Nanyuki and Rome	The Crown Prince visited the countries to foster friendly relations at the invitation of Ghana and Kenya.	President John Atta Mills; President Mwai Kibaki
17–21 June 2010	Sweden		Stockholm	The Crown Prince attended the wedding of Victoria, Crown Princess of Sweden, and Daniel Westling at the invitation of Sweden (representing the Emperor).	King Carl XVI Gustaf
21–25 June 2011	Germany		Berlin	The Crown Prince visited the country to foster friendly relations on the occasion of the 150th anniversary of the establishment of diplomatic relations at the invitation of Germany.	President Christian Wulff
26–27 October 2011	Saudi Arabia		Riyadh	The Crown Prince visited the country to pay condolences following the death of Sultan bin Abdulaziz, Crown Prince of Saudi Arabia.	King and Prime Minister Abdullah of Saudi Arabia
20–21 June 2012	Saudi Arabia		Riyadh and Jeddah	The Crown Prince visited the country to pay condolences following the death of Nayef bin Abdulaziz, Crown Prince of Saudi Arabia.	King and Prime Minister Abdullah of Saudi Arabia
25 June – 1 July 2012	Thailand; Cambodia; Laos		Bangkok, Phnom Penh, Siem Reap, Vientiane and Luang Prabang	The Crown Prince visited the countries to foster friendly relations at the invitation of Thailand, Cambodia and Laos.	King Bhumibol Adulyadej; King Norodom Sihamoni; President Choummaly Sayasone
18–21 October 2012	Luxembourg		Luxembourg City	The Crown Prince attended the wedding of Guillaume, Hereditary Grand Duke of Luxembourg, and Countess Stéphanie de Lannoy at the invitation of Luxembourg (representing the Emperor).	Grand Duke Henri of Luxembourg
5–8 March 2013	United States		New York City	The Crown Prince attended and delivered the keynote speech at The United Nations Special Thematic Sessions on Water and Disasters at the invitation of Secretary-General Ban Ki-moon.	
28 April – 3 May 2013	Netherlands		Amsterdam	The Crown Prince and Crown Princess attended the inauguration of Willem-Alexander at the invitation of the Netherlands (representing the Emperor).	King Willem-Alexander of the Netherlands
10–16 June 2013	Spain		Madrid, Salamanca, Seville, Coria del Río and Santiago de Compostela	The Crown Prince visited the country to foster friendly relations on the occasion of the 400th anniversary of Japan–Spain relations at the invitation of Spain.	King Juan Carlos I
9–11 December 2013	South Africa		Johannesburg	The Crown Prince toured the country to attend the state memorial service of former President Nelson Mandela.	President Jacob Zuma
17–23 June 2014	Switzerland		Zurich, Bern, Neuchâtel, Interlaken and Brienz	The Crown Prince visited the country to foster friendly relations on the occasion of the 150th anniversary of the establishment of diplomatic relations at the invitation of Switzerland.	President Didier Burkhalter
25–26 January 2015	Saudi Arabia		Riyadh	The Crown Prince toured the country to pay condolences following the death of King Abdullah bin Abdulaziz Al Saud, Guardian of the Two Holy Mosques of Saudi Arabia.	King Salman of Saudi Arabia
2–6 July 2015	Tonga		Nukuʻalofa	The Crown Prince and Crown Princess attended the coronation of King Tupou VI.	King Tupou VI
17–21 November 2015	United States		New York City	The Crown Prince attended and delivered the keynote speech at The United Nations Special Thematic Sessions on Water and Disasters, and delivered the speech at the Final Report Hand-over Ceremony of United Nations Secretary-Generals’ Advisory Board on Water and Sanitation.	
13–17 April 2017	Malaysia		Kuala Lumpur	The Crown Prince visited the country to foster friendly relations on the occasion of the 60th anniversary of the establishment of diplomatic relations at the invitation of Malaysia.	King Muhammad V of Kelantan
15–21 June 2017	Denmark		Copenhagen and Odense	The Crown Prince visited the country to foster friendly relations on the occasion of the 150th anniversary of the establishment of diplomatic relations at the invitation of Denmark.	Queen Margrethe II
16–22 March 2018	Brazil	United States	Dallas, Miami, Brasília and Los Angeles	The Crown Prince attended and delivered the keynote speech at the 8th World Water Forum at the invitation of Brazil.	President Michel Temer
7–15 September 2018	France		Lyon, Santenay, Grenoble, Paris and Versailles	The Crown Prince visited the country to foster friendly relations on the occasion of the 160th anniversary of the friendship between Japan and France at the invitation of France.	President Emmanuel Macron

== As Emperor ==
=== 2020s ===
Date	Country	Stopover	Areas visited	Details	Host
17–20 September 2022 (Reiwa 4)	United Kingdom		London	It was imperial couple's first trip abroad as Emperor and Empress attended the state funeral of Queen Elizabeth II.	King Charles III
17–23 June 2023 (Reiwa 5)	Indonesia		Jakarta and Yogyakarta	The Emperor and Empress made their first state visit	President Joko Widodo
22–29 June 2024 (Reiwa 6)	United Kingdom		London, Oxford and Carterton	The Emperor and Empress embarked the three-day state visit. The imperial couple had originally planned to visit in 2020 as guests of Queen Elizabeth II, but the state visit was cancelled due to the COVID-19 pandemic. The rescheduled visit went ahead despite concerns of postponement due to the British general election campaign that began in late May. It was the first state visit in modern times to take place during an active election campaign.	King Charles III
6–13 July 2025 (Reiwa 7)	Mongolia		Ulaanbaatar	One week as state guests; the timing was chosen based on the 80th anniversary of the end of World War II. Former foreign minister Taro Kono was named as the couple's chief attendant for the trip, which marked the first official visit to Mongolia by a Japanese Emperor. On the visit, the Emperor and Empress visited a memorial to Japanese prisoners of war who had been held in modern-day Mongolia, as well as attending Mongolia's annual Naadam festival.	President Ukhnaagiin Khürelsükh
13–25 June 2026 (Reiwa 8)	Netherlands; Belgium		Delft, The Hague, Utrecht, Apeldoorn, Amsterdam, Leiden, Ciergnon, Brussels, Namur and Leuven	The Emperor and Empress made a state visit to the Netherlands and Belgium from 13 to 25 June. Ahead of the formal start of the state visit, they stayed with the Dutch royal family at Het Oude Loo and with Belgian royal family at the Royal Castle of Ciergnon.	King Willem-Alexander; King Philippe

== See also ==
- List of official overseas trips made by Akihito
- List of state visits received by Akihito
- List of state visits received by Hirohito
- List of state visits received by Naruhito
