= Ibsen Year 2006 =

The Ibsen Year 2006 (Norwegian: Ibsenåret 2006) was the Norwegian government's official celebration of Henrik Ibsen in 2006, marking the 100th anniversary of his death. The Ibsen Year included cultural events in multiple countries, including an opening ceremony in Oslo attended by the royal family and international guests, television programs, cultural events in Italy, Germany, the United Kingdom, the United States, China and other countries, and an International Gala performance at the Great Pyramid of Giza in Egypt, hosted by the country's First Lady Suzanne Mubarak and also attended by Queen Sonja. The Ibsen Year's artistic director was Bentein Baardson and the producer was Nora Ibsen. The chairman of the supervisory committee was former Norwegian Minister of Culture Lars Roar Langslet. The planning committee of the Ibsen Year had a core budget of around 70 million NOK, not counting TV productions and various other costs.

Queen Sonja was the Ibsen Year's high protector. The Norwegian Ministry of Foreign Affairs and the embassies around the world had an important role in carrying out the Ibsen Year.

The Ibsen Year comprised 8213 separate cultural events, and 83 countries took part in the commemoration.

The Ibsen Year 2028 marks the 200th anniversary of Ibsen's birth.

== Egypt ==
An International Gala performance of Peer Gynt took place at the Great Pyramid of Giza in Egypt, under the auspices of First Lady Suzanne Mubarak and attended by Queen Sonja and other guests. It was directed by Bentein Baardson and produced by Nora Ibsen. Together with the official opening of the Ibsen Year in Oslo, this was the highlight of the Ibsen Year. Several other cultural events related to Henrik Ibsen in collaboration between Norwegian and Egyptian authorities also took place in Egypt. Suzanne Mubarak was awarded the Ibsen Centennial Commemoration Award by Queen Sonja, as one of three officials of state to receive this honour (the other ones being the Queen and the Norwegian Foreign Minister).

== United States ==
The Ibsen Year in the United States was launched in New York on 1 March 2006 at the Brooklyn Academy of Music. Cate Blanchett, who played the title role in Hedda Gabler in the Sydney Theatre Company's visiting performance there, was awarded the Ibsen Centennial Commemoration Award, presented by Minister of Equality Karita Bekkemellem.

== Organisation and planning ==
The planning committee, a government commission named the National Committee for the Ibsen Initiative (Nasjonalkomiteen for Ibsensatsingen), was appointed by the Ministry of Culture in 1997, and was headed by former Minister of Culture Lars Roar Langslet. The committee's mandate ceased in 2006/2007, with the conclusion of the Ibsen Year.

Ibsenåret AS, a limited company, was the secretariat of the national committee, responsible for organising the Ibsen Year. It was first led by Steinar Hansson until his death in 2004, and then by Bentein Baardson. Baardson recruited Ibsen's great-great-granddaughter, Nora Ibsen, as the producer of the Ibsen Year.

== See also ==
- International Ibsen Award
- Ibsen Centennial Commemoration Award
