= African Centre for Women's Healthcare =

Non-profit training and research center

Coordinates: 31°12′13″N 29°54′12″E

African Centre for Women's Healthcare المركز الإفريقى لخدمات صحة المرأة
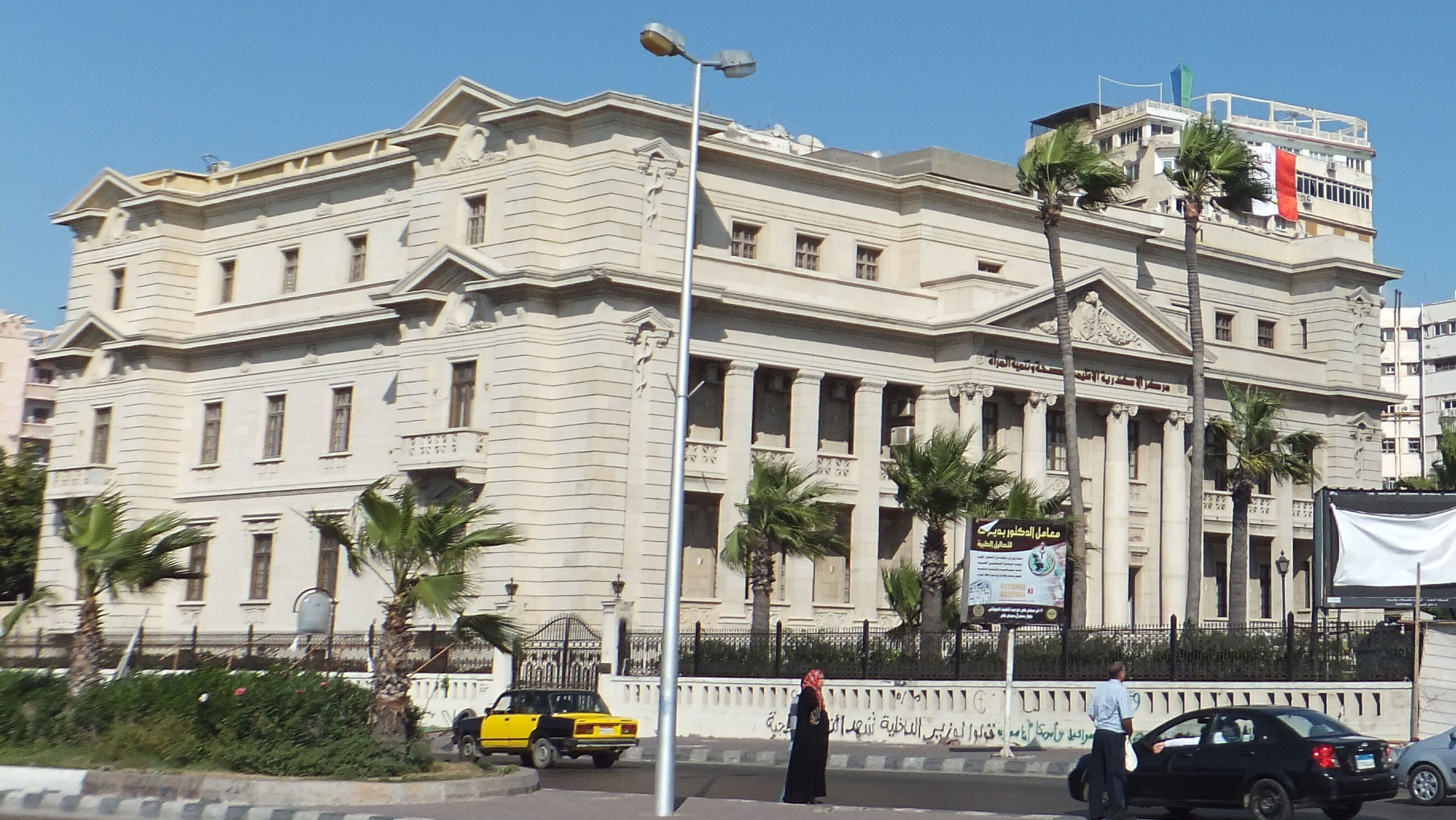
- Type: Non-profit
- Location: Alexandria (Egypt)
- Region served: Egypt; Arab World; Middle East; Africa
- Key people: Prof. Soraya A. Sharaf (Director)
- Employees: 150
- Formerly called: Suzanne Mubarak Regional Centre for Women's Health and Development

African Centre for Women's Healthcare (formerly called The Suzanne Mubarak Regional Centre for Women's Health and Development) is a non-profit medical center in Alexandria, Egypt. It is concerned with women's health and women's development in Egypt and its neighboring countries. The Centre was named after Suzanne Mubarak, wife of former Egyptian president Hosni Mubarak, who was interested in improving the physical and social well-being of women in Egypt.

== Research ==
The Center also contains a digital library and specialized clinics. In 2007, it organized a conference on violence against women.
