= List of state visits received by Naruhito =

Since acceding to the throne of Japan in 2019, Emperor Naruhito has been responsible for receiving state and official visits. He hosts the state banquets at Tokyo Imperial Palace.

== Summary ==
As of 30 May 2026, the number of official state visits received by Naruhito are:

- One: Brazil, the Philippines, and the United States.

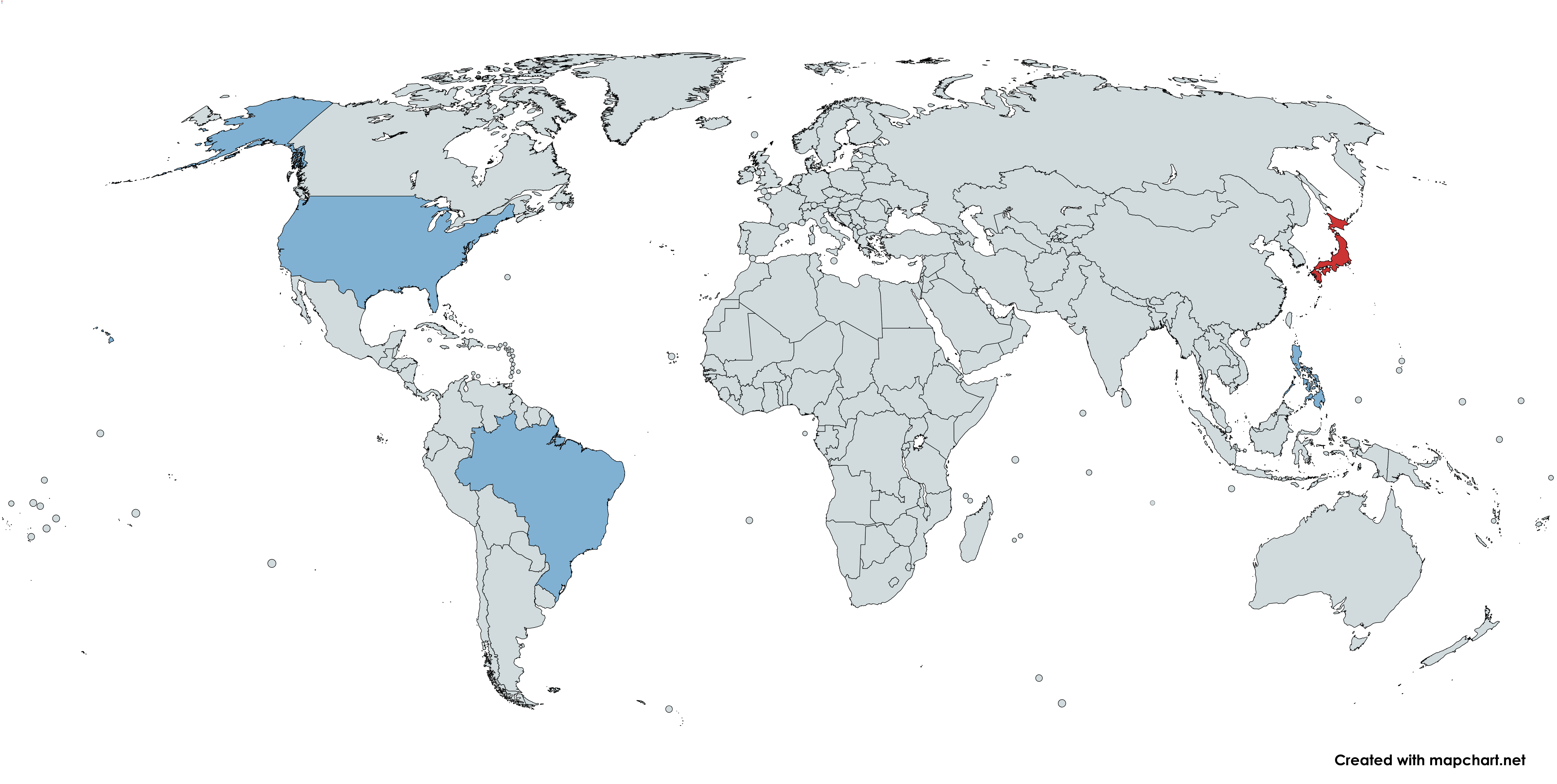
World map highlighting the countries received by Naruhito during his reign: (30 May 2026) Japan One visit

== List of visits ==
#	Date	Country	Regime	Guests	Image
2010s
1	25–28 May 2019	United States	Republic	President Donald Trump; First Lady Melania Trump	
2020s
2	24–27 March 2025	Brazil	Republic	President Luiz Inácio Lula da Silva; First Lady Rosângela Lula da Silva	
3	26–29 May 2026	Philippines	Republic	President Bongbong Marcos; First Lady Liza Araneta Marcos	

== Countries that have made state visits ==
Countries	State Visits
Brazil	1
Philippines	1
United States	1

== See also ==
- Foreign relations of Japan
- List of official overseas trips made by Akihito
- List of official overseas trips made by Naruhito
- List of state visits received by Akihito
- List of state visits received by Hirohito
