= List of official overseas trips made by Akihito =

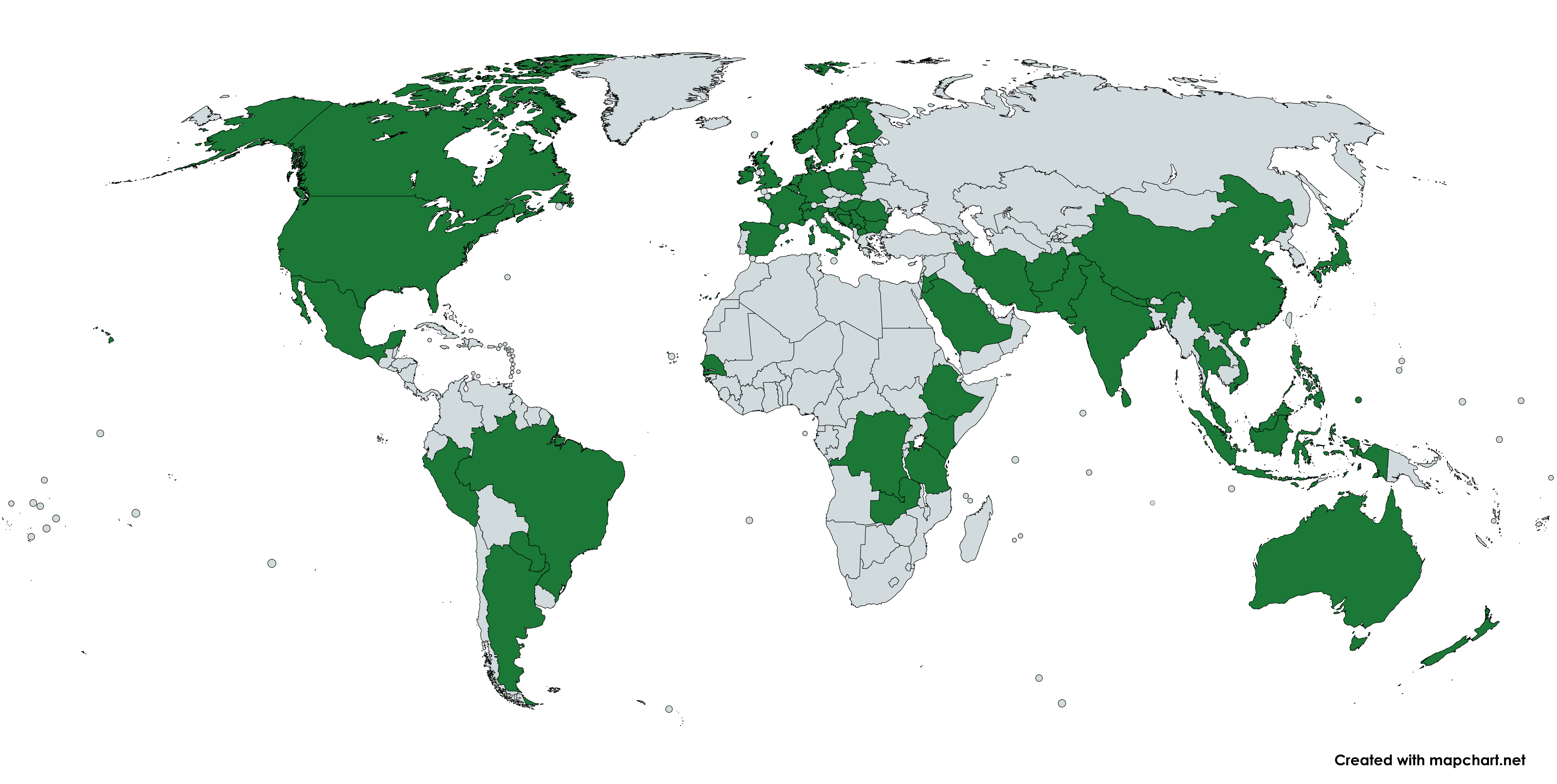
Map of countries visited by Akihito on an official overseas visit

As Crown Prince and later as Emperor, Akihito had been one of the Japan's most important ambassadors. He traveled overseas as a representative of Japan. He was accompanied by his wife, Empress Michiko.

== As Crown Prince ==
=== 1950s ===
Date	Country	Stopover	Accompanied by	Details
30 March – 12 October 1953	United Kingdom	United States; Canada; France; Spain; Monaco; Italy; Vatican City; Belgium; Netherlands; West Germany; Denmark; Norway; Sweden; Switzerland		Attended the coronation of Queen Elizabeth II (representing the Emperor).

=== 1960s ===
Date	Country	Stopover	Accompanied by	Details
22 September – 7 October 1960	United States		Crown Princess	100th anniversary of Japan–US friendship
12 November – 9 December 1960	Iran; Ethiopia; India; Nepal	Thailand	Crown Princess	International Goodwill (Representative)
22 January – 10 February 1962	Pakistan; Indonesia		Crown Princess	International Goodwill (Representative)
5–10 November 1962	Philippines		Crown Princess	International Goodwill (Representative)
10–17 May 1964	Mexico	United States	Crown Princess	International Goodwill (Representative)
14–21 December 1964	Thailand		Crown Princess	International Goodwill (Representative)
9–31 May 1967	Peru; Argentina; Brazil		Crown Princess	International Goodwill (Representative)

=== 1970s ===
Date	Country	Stopover	Accompanied by	Details
19–28 February 1970	Malaysia (representing the Emperor); Singapore		Crown Princess	International Goodwill
3–12 June 1971	Afghanistan	Iran; Thailand	Crown Princess	International Goodwill (Representative)
6–23 May 1973	Australia; New Zealand		Crown Princess	International Goodwill
11–22 October 1973	Spain	United States; Belgium	Crown Princess	International Goodwill
20–28 February 1975	Nepal	Bangladesh; India	Crown Princess	Attended the Coronation of the King Birendra of Nepal
8–25 June 1976	Jordan; Yugoslavia (representing the Emperor); United Kingdom	Thailand	Crown Princess	International Goodwill
12–27 June 1978	Brazil; Paraguay	United States	Crown Princess	Attendance at the 70th Anniversary Ceremony of Japanese immigration in Brazil
5–14 October 1979	Romania; Bulgaria (representing the Emperor)	Netherlands; Belgium	Crown Princess	International Goodwill

=== 1980s ===
Date	Country	Stopover	Accompanied by	Details
27 February – 7 March 1981	Saudi Arabia; Sri Lanka	Thailand; Singapore	Crown Princess	International Goodwill
26 July – 2 August 1981	United Kingdom	Belgium	Crown Princess	Attended the wedding of Prince Charles and Lady Diana Spencer
10–25 March 1983	Zambia; Tanzania; Kenya (representing the Emperor)	Luxembourg; Belgium; Thailand	Crown Princess	International Goodwill
25 February – 8 March 1984	Zaire; Senegal (representing the Emperor)	Belgium; United Kingdom	Crown Princess	International Goodwill
23 February – 9 March 1985	Spain; Ireland (representing the Emperor)	Poland; United Kingdom	Crown Princess	International Goodwill
1–15 June 1985	Sweden; Denmark; Norway (representing the Emperor); Finland		Crown Princess	International Goodwill
3–10 October 1987	United States		Crown Princess	International Goodwill

== As Emperor ==
=== 1990s ===
Date	Country	Stopover	Areas visited	Accompanied by	Details	Host
26 September – 6 October 1991 (Heisei 3)	Thailand; Malaysia; Indonesia		Bangkok, Sukhothai Thani, Chiang Mai, Kuala Lumpur, Kuala Kangsar, Jakarta and Yogyakarta	Empress	International goodwill, invited by countries	King Bhumibol Adulyadej; King Azlan Shah of Perak; President Suharto
23–28 October 1992 (Heisei 4)	China		Beijing, Xi'an and Shanghai	Empress	International goodwill, invited by countries	President Yang
6–9 August 1993 (Heisei 5)	Belgium		Brussels	Empress	Attended the state funeral of King Baudouin of Belgium	King Albert II
3–19 September 1993 (Heisei 5)	Italy; Belgium; Germany	Vatican City	Rome, Florence, Milan, Brussels, Mons, Antwerp, Ciergnon, Bonn, Bielefeld, Düsseldorf, Berlin, Weimar and Munich	Empress	International goodwill, invited by countries	President Scalfaro; King Albert II; President Weizsäcker
10–26 June 1994 (Heisei 6)	United States		Atlanta, Charleston, Washington, D.C., Charlottesville, New York City, St. Louis, Longmont, Denver, Los Angeles, San Francisco and Honolulu	Empress	International goodwill, invited by countries	President Clinton
2–14 October 1994 (Heisei 6)	France; Spain	Germany	Frankfurt, Paris, Toulouse, Palma de Mallorca, Madrid, Salamanca and Barcelona	Empress	International goodwill, invited by countries	President Mitterrand; King Juan Carlos I
30 May – 13 June 1997 (Heisei 9)	Brazil; Argentina	Luxembourg; United States	Luxembourg City, Belém, Brasília, Belo Horizonte, São Paulo, Curitiba, Rio de Janeiro, Buenos Aires and Los Angeles	Empress	International goodwill, invited by countries	President Cardoso; President Menem
23 May – 5 June 1998 (Heisei 10)	United Kingdom; Denmark	Portugal	Lisbon, London, Cardiff, Billund and Copenhagen	Empress	International goodwill, invited by countries	Queen Elizabeth II; Queen Margrethe II

=== 2000s ===
Date	Country	Stopover	Areas visited	Accompanied by	Details	Host
20 May – 1 June 2000 (Heisei 12)	Netherlands; Sweden	Switzerland; Finland	Geneva, Amsterdam, Apeldoorn, Helsinki and Stockholm	Empress	International goodwill, invited by countries	Queen Beatrix; King Carl XVI Gustaf
6–20 July 2002 (Heisei 14)	Poland; Hungary	Czech Republic; Austria	Prague, Warsaw, Kraków, Vienna and Budapest	Empress	International goodwill, invited by countries	President Kwaśniewski; President Mádl
7–14 May 2005 (Heisei 17)	Norway	Ireland	Dublin, Oslo and Trondheim	Empress	International goodwill, invited by countries	Regent Crown Prince Haakon (King Harald V)
27–28 June 2005 (Heisei 17)	United States		Saipan	Empress	Peace Memorial Service for War Dead of World War II	
8–15 June 2006 (Heisei 18)	Singapore; Thailand	Malaysia	Singapore, Ipoh, Kuala Lumpur and Bangkok	Empress	International Goodwill Invitation from Singapore; Attendance at the 60th Anniversary Ceremony of the Accession of the King Bhumibol Adulyadej	President Nathan; King Bhumibol Adulyadej
21–30 May 2007 (Heisei 19)	Sweden; Estonia; Latvia; Lithuania; United Kingdom		Stockholm, Tallinn, Riga, Vilnius and London	Empress	Visited Sweden and UK on the occasion of the 300th anniversary of Carl Linnaeus's birth International Goodwill Invitations from Baltic states	President Ilves; President Vīķe-Freiberga; President Adamkus
3–17 July 2009 (Heisei 21)	Canada; United States		Ottawa, Pontiac, Toronto, Vancouver, Victoria, Honolulu and Kailua-Kona	Empress	International Goodwill Invitation from Canada; 50th Anniversary Celebration of the Crown Prince Akihito Scholarship Foundation in Hawaii	Governor General Jean

=== 2010s ===
Date	Country	Stopover	Areas visited	Accompanied by	Details	Host
16–20 May 2012 (Heisei 24)	United Kingdom		London	Empress	Invitation to the commemorative luncheon for the Diamond Jubilee of Queen Elizabeth II	Queen Elizabeth II
30 November – 6 December 2013 (Heisei 25)	India		Delhi and Chennai	Empress	International Goodwill Invitation from the Government of India	President Mukherjee
8–9 April 2015 (Heisei 27)	Palau		Babeldaob, Koror and Peleliu	Empress	Memorial Service for War Dead of World War II and Prayer for Peace, Invitation from Palau	President Remengesau Jr.
27–30 January 2016 (Heisei 28)	Philippines		Manila, Cavinti and Los Baños	Empress	International goodwill, invitation from the Philippine government, memorial for war dead of World War II, prayer for peace	President Aquino III
28 February – 6 March 2017 (Heisei 29)	Vietnam	Thailand	Hanoi, Huế and Bangkok	Empress	International goodwill, invitation from the Vietnamese government, memorial for war dead of World War II, prayer for peace Condolences for the Late King Bhumibol Adulyadej	President Quang

== See also ==
- List of official overseas trips made by Naruhito
- List of state visits received by Akihito
- List of state visits received by Hirohito
- List of state visits received by Naruhito
