= The Thames and I =

Memoir written by Naruhito

The Thames and I: A Memoir of Two Years at Oxford is a memoir written by Naruhito, Emperor of Japan, that describes his time studying at Merton College, Oxford, from June 1983 to October 1985. The book's title refers to Naruhito's thesis completed at Oxford: a study of "navigation and traffic" on the River Thames in the 18th century. In the book, Naruhito writes that even after leaving Oxford seven years prior, the name of the river "conjures up in me feelings of affection and nostalgia transcending distance and time."

The Thames and I was written in 1992 and translated into English in 2006. The original Japanese version was printed in a small number of copies by a private press, and not sold to the public. The Times described the memoir as "unusually frank".
