= Ibsen Centennial Commemoration Award =

The Ibsen Centennial Commemoration Award (Norwegian: Ibsenstatuetten) was awarded by the Government of Norway in commemoration of playwright Henrik Ibsen on the occasion of the 2006 Ibsen Year, the 100th anniversary of Ibsen's death. The prize was awarded to 14 actors and 3 officials of state.

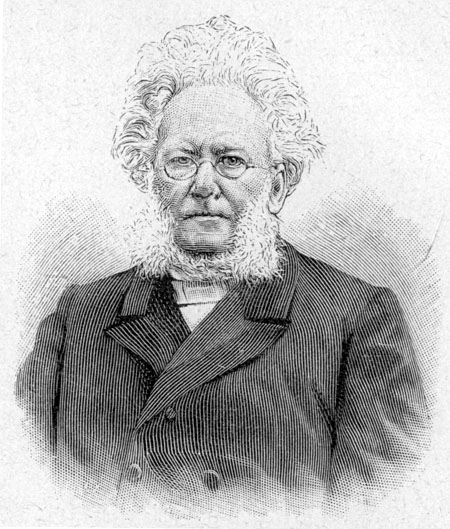
Henrik Ibsen

== Laureates ==
=== Officials of state ===
- Queen Sonja of Norway, the Ibsen Year's high protector
- Suzanne Mubarak, First Lady of Egypt, the protector of the International Ibsen Gala Performance in Egypt. The prize was awarded by Queen Sonja.
- Jonas Gahr Støre, Foreign Minister of Norway, for the active involvement of the Foreign Ministry in the Ibsen Year. The prize was awarded by Lars Roar Langslet.

=== Actors ===
- Cate Blanchett, who played the title role in Hedda Gabler in the Sydney Theatre Company's visiting performance at the Brooklyn Academy of Music. The prize was awarded by the Minister of Equality Karita Bekkemellem.
- Liv Ullmann
- Vanessa Redgrave
- Annette Bening
- Bibi Andersson
- Isabelle Huppert
- Glenda Jackson
- Shaoli Mitra
- Ghita Nørby
- Natalja M. Tenjakova
- Angela Winkler
- Franca Nuti
- Wenche Foss
- Lise Fjeldstad

== See also ==
- International Ibsen Award
