= Naruhito =

Emperor of Japan since 2019

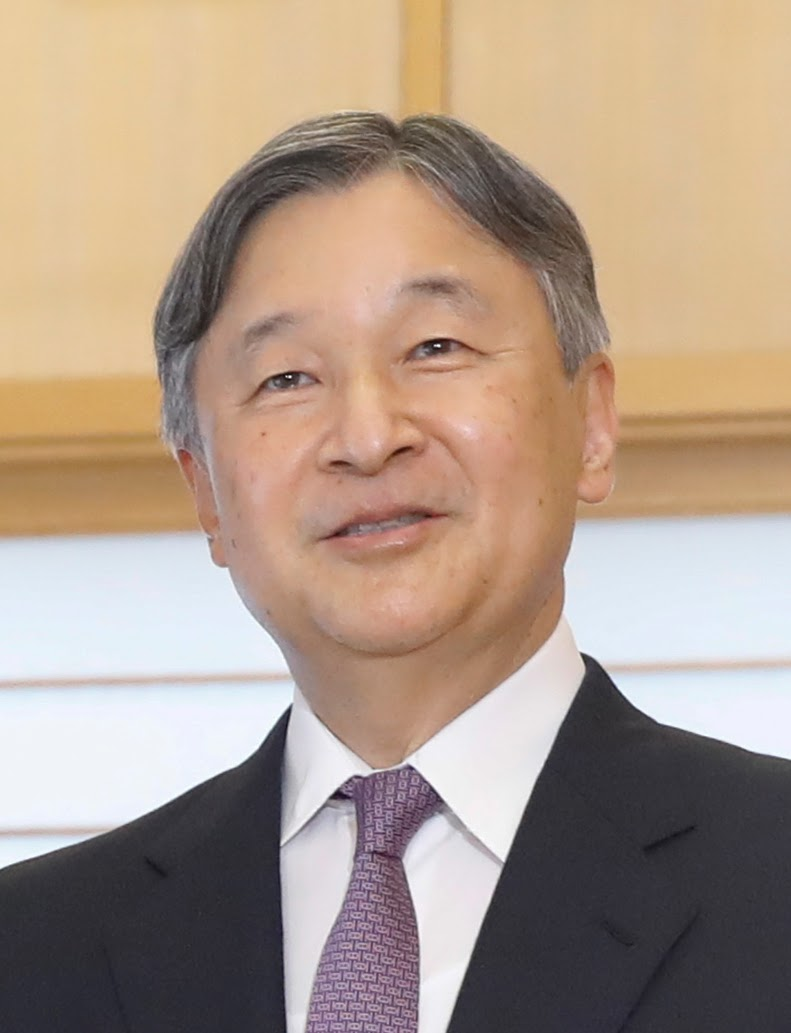
- Naruhito in 2025

Emperor of Japan
- Reign: 1 May 2019 – present
- Enthronement: 22 October 2019
- Predecessor: Akihito
- Heir presumptive: Fumihito
- Born: Naruhito, Prince Hiro (浩宮徳仁親王); 23 February 1960 (age 66); Imperial Palace, Tokyo, Japan
- Spouse: Masako Owada (m. 1993)
- Issue: Aiko, Princess Toshi
Era name and dates
- Reiwa: 1 May 2019 – present
- House: Imperial House of Japan
- Father: Akihito
- Mother: Michiko Shōda
- Religion: Shinto

Naruhito (Note: Japanese: 徳仁, pronounced [naɾɯꜜçi̥to],) (born 23 February 1960) is the Emperor of Japan. He acceded to the Chrysanthemum Throne on 1 May 2019 following the abdication of his father, Akihito. He is the 126th monarch, according to the traditional order of succession. His reign is known as the Reiwa era.

Naruhito is the elder son of Emperor Emeritus Akihito and Empress Emerita Michiko. He was born in the Tokyo Imperial Palace during the reign of his paternal grandfather, Hirohito. He became heir apparent following his father's accession in 1989, and was formally invested as Crown Prince in 1991. He attended Gakushūin schools in Tokyo and later studied history at Gakushuin University and English at Merton College, Oxford. He married the diplomat Masako Owada in 1993. They have one daughter: Aiko, Princess Toshi.

Continuing his grandfather's and father's boycott over the enshrinement of convicted war criminals, he has never visited Yasukuni Shrine. He is an advocate in the fields of water policy and water conservation. He was an honorary president of the 2020 Summer Olympics and Paralympics and is a supporter of the World Organization of the Scout Movement.

== Name ==
Before his accession, he was generally referred in the Japanese press by his princely title Kōtaishi (Crown Prince, 皇太子; lit. 'Great Imperial Son'). Upon succeeding to the throne he is referred to as "His Majesty the Emperor" (天皇陛下, Tennō Heika), which may be shortened to "His Majesty" (陛下, Heika). In writing, the emperor is also referred to formally as "The Reigning Emperor" (今上天皇, Kinjō Tennō). The era of his reign bears the name "Reiwa" (令和) pronounced [ɾeːwa], and according to custom he will be referred to as Emperor Reiwa (令和天皇, Reiwa Tennō; see "posthumous name") by order of the Cabinet after his death.

The name of the next era under his successor will be established after his death or before his abdication.

== Early life ==
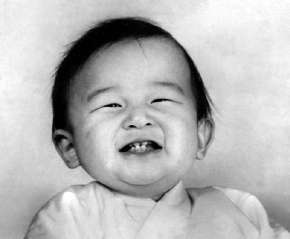
Naruhito in February 1961

Naruhito was born on 23 February 1960 at 4:15 p.m. in the Imperial Household Agency Hospital in Tokyo Imperial Palace. As a prince, he later quipped, "I was born in a barn inside the moat". His parents, Emperor Akihito and Empress Michiko, were then crown prince and crown princess of Japan, while his paternal grandfather, Hirohito, reigned as emperor.

His childhood was reported to be happy, and he enjoyed activities such as mountain climbing, horseback riding, and learning the violin. He played with the children of the royal chamberlain, and he was a fan of the Yomiuri Giants in the Central League, his favorite player being No. 3, later team manager, Shigeo Nagashima. One day, Naruhito found the remains of an ancient roadway on the palace grounds, sparking a lifelong fascination with the history of transportation, which would provide the subject of his bachelor's and master's degrees in history. He later said, "I have had a keen interest in roads since childhood. On roads, you can go to the unknown world. Since I have been leading a life where I have few chances to go out freely, roads are a precious bridge to the unknown world, so to speak."

In August 1974, when the prince was 14, he was sent to Melbourne, Australia, for a homestay. His father, then the crown prince, had a positive experience there on a trip the year before and encouraged his son to go as well. He stayed with the family of a businessman named Colin Harper. He got along with his host brothers, riding around Point Lonsdale, playing the violin and tennis, and climbing Uluru together. Once, he played the violin for dignitaries at a state dinner at Government House hosted by Governor-General Sir John Kerr.

== Education ==
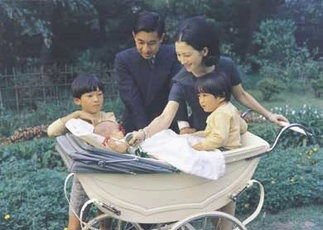
Prince Naruhito, aged 9, with his parents and siblings, 1969

When the Prince was four years old he was enrolled in the prestigious Gakushūin school system, where many of Japan's elite families and narikin (nouveaux riches) send their children. In senior high, Naruhito joined the geography club.

He graduated from Gakushuin University in March 1982 with a Bachelor of Letters degree in history. In July 1983, he undertook a three-month intensive English course before entering Merton College of the University of Oxford in the United Kingdom, where he studied until 1986. He did not, however, submit his thesis A Study of Navigation and Traffic on the Upper Thames in the 18th Century until 1989. He later revisited these years in his book, The Thames and I – a Memoir of Two Years at Oxford. He visited some 21 historic pubs, including The Trout Inn. He joined the Japan Society and the drama society, and became the honorary president of the karate and judo clubs. He played inter-college tennis, seeded number three out of six on the Merton team, and took golf lessons from a pro. In his three years at Merton he also climbed the highest peaks in three of the constituent countries of the United Kingdom: Scotland's Ben Nevis, Wales's Snowdon and Scafell Pike in England.

While at Oxford, he also was able to go sightseeing across Europe and meet much of its royalty, including the British royal family. The relatively relaxed manners of the United Kingdom's royals amazed him: "Queen Elizabeth II, he noted with surprise, poured her own tea and served the sandwiches." He also went skiing with Liechtenstein's Prince Hans-Adam II, holidayed in Mallorca in the Mediterranean with Spain's King Juan Carlos I, and sailed with Norway's Crown Prince Harald and Crown Princess Sonja and Queen Beatrix of the Netherlands.

Upon his return to Japan, he enrolled once more in Gakushūin University to earn a Master of Humanities degree in history, successfully earning his degree in 1988.

== Personal life ==
=== Marriage and family ===
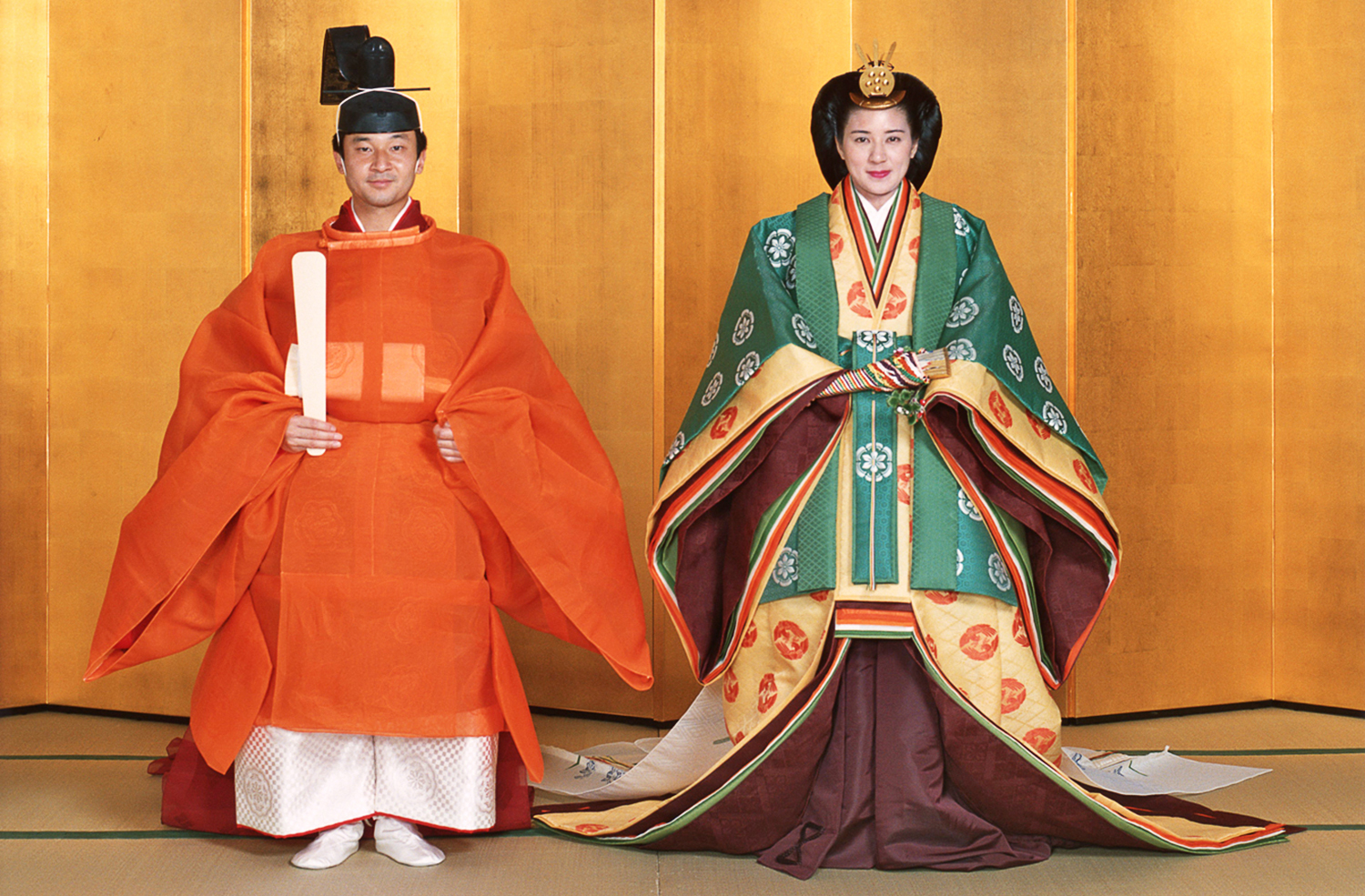
The newly married crown prince and crown princess in traditional court dress, with the prince wearing a sokutai, the princess a jūnihitoe (1993)

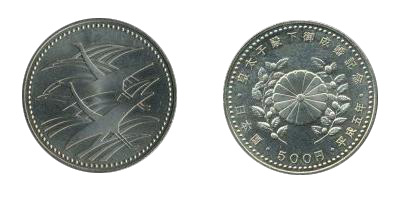
A 500-yen coin issued to commemorate the Imperial Wedding

Naruhito first met Masako Owada, a staff member working at the Ministry of Foreign Affairs, at a tea gathering for Infanta Elena of Spain in November 1986, during her studies at the University of Tokyo. The prince was immediately captivated by her, and arranged for them to meet several times over the next few weeks. Because of this, they were pursued relentlessly by the press throughout 1987.

Despite the Imperial Household Agency's disapproval of her, and her attending Balliol College, Oxford, for the next two years, he remained interested in her. He proposed to her three times before the Imperial Palace announced their engagement on 19 January 1993. The wedding took place on 9 June the same year at the Imperial Shinto Hall in Tokyo before 800 invited guests, including many of Europe's heads of state and royalty.

By the time of their marriage, his father had ascended the throne, so the prince had been invested as the crown prince with the title Prince Hiro (浩宮, Hiro-no-miya) on 23 February 1991.

Her first pregnancy was announced in December 1999, but she miscarried. They finally had one daughter, Aiko, Princess Toshi (敬宮愛子内親王, Toshi-no-miya Aiko Naishinnō), born 1 December 2001 at the Imperial Household Agency Hospital at Tokyo Imperial Palace.

=== Hobbies and interests ===
He is interested in water policy and water conservation. In March 2003, in his capacity as honorary president of the Third World Water Forum, he delivered a speech at the forum's opening ceremony titled "Waterways Connecting Kyoto and Local Regions". Visiting Mexico in March 2006, he gave the keynote address at the opening ceremony for the Fourth World Water Forum, "Edo and Water Transport". And in December 2007, he gave a commemorative talk at the opening ceremony for the First Asia-Pacific Water Summit, "Humans and Water: From Japan to the Asia-Pacific Region".

He plays the viola, having switched from the violin because he thought the latter "too much of a leader, too prominent" to suit his musical and personal tastes. He enjoys jogging, hiking, and mountaineering in his spare time.

== Crown Prince ==
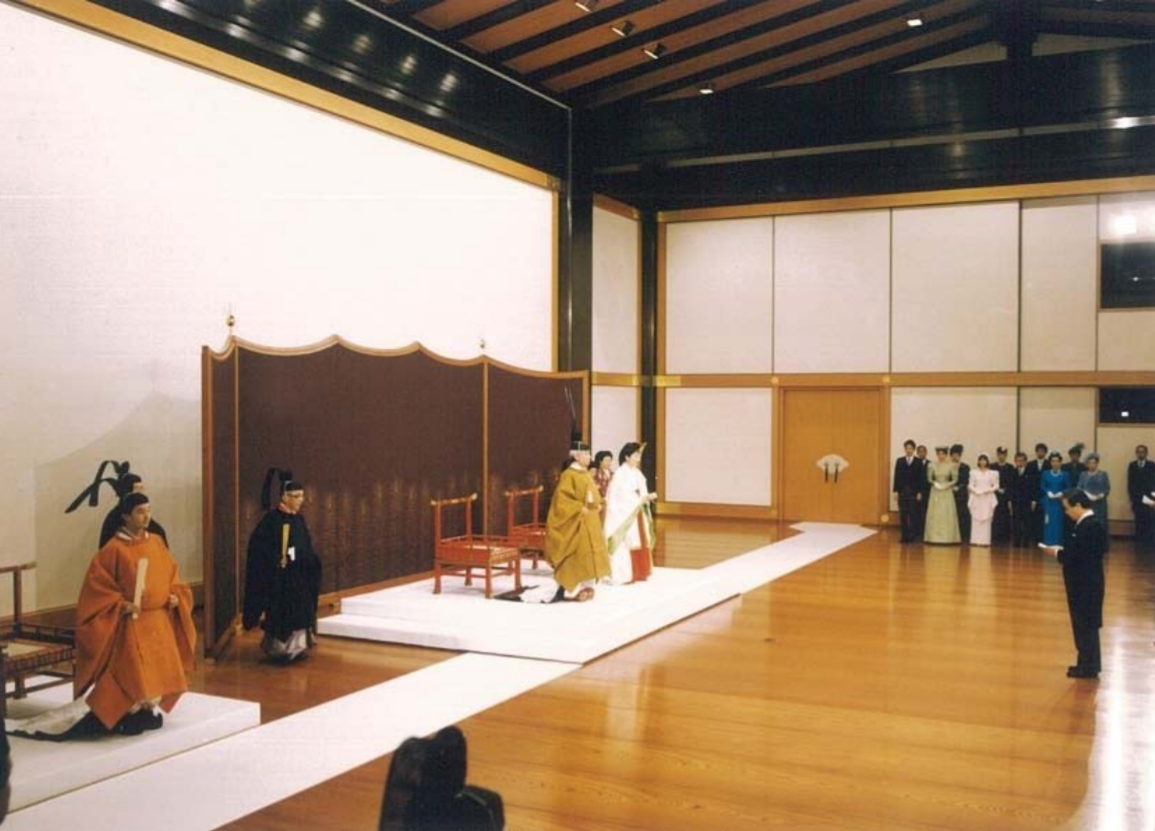
Naruhito at his Ceremony for Proclamation of Crown Prince (Rikkōshi-Senmei-no-gi) in 1991

As crown prince, he was a patron of the 1998 Winter Olympics and 1998 Winter Paralympics. He is also a supporter of the World Organization of the Scout Movement and in 2006 attended the 14th Nippon Jamboree, the Japanese national jamboree organized by the Scout Association of Japan. The crown prince had also been an honorary vice-president of the Japanese Red Cross Society since 1994. In 2001, the crown prince visited the United Kingdom; he met Queen Elizabeth II and Prince Philip, Duke of Edinburgh at Windsor Castle.

For two weeks in 2012, the crown prince temporarily took charge of his father's duties while Emperor Akihito underwent and recovered from heart bypass surgery.

== Reign ==
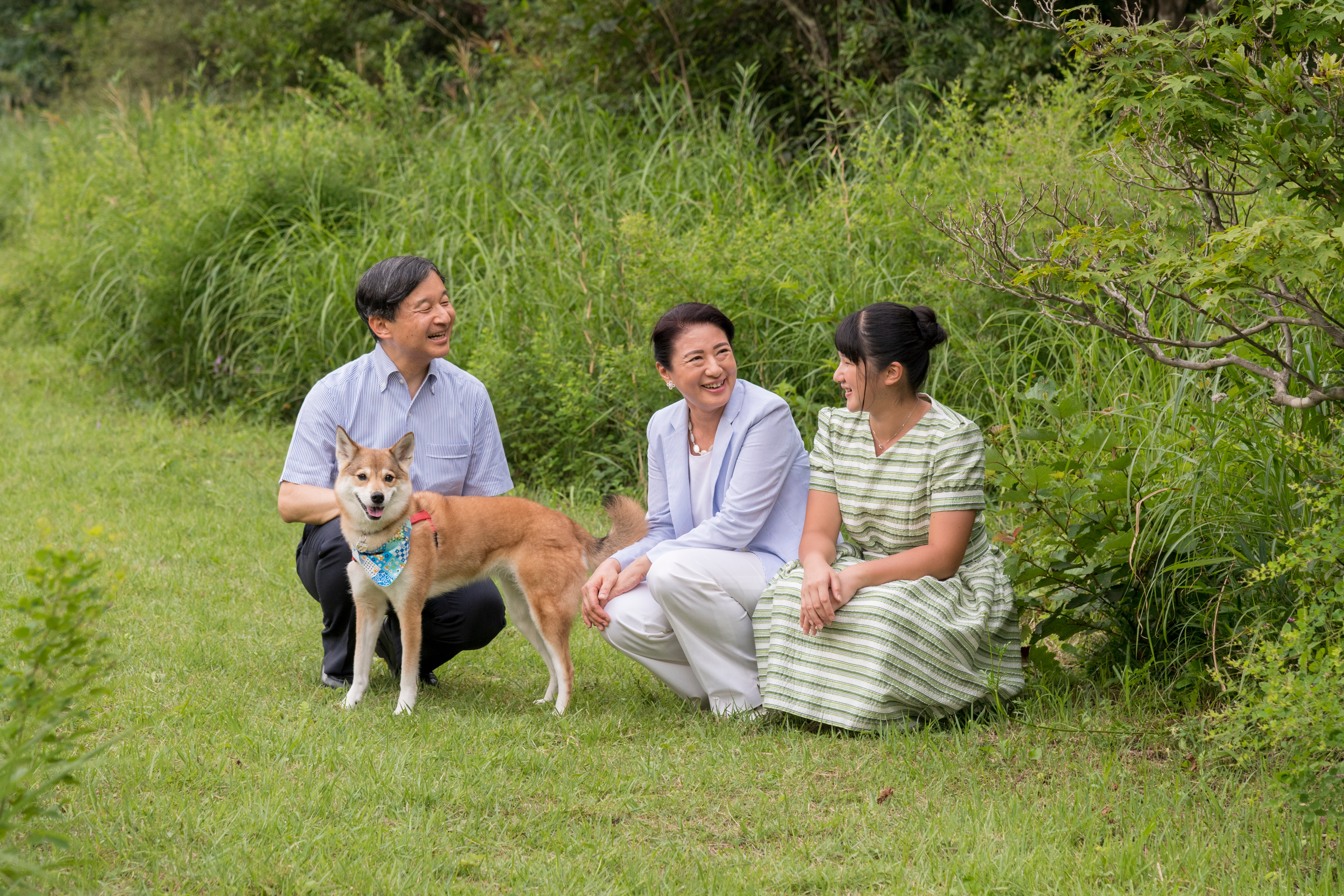
The Emperor and Empress with their daughter, Princess Aiko, in Nasu, Tochigi, 2019

On 1 December 2017, Prime Minister Shinzo Abe announced that Naruhito's father, Emperor Akihito, would abdicate on 30 April 2019, and that Naruhito would become the 126th emperor of Japan as of 1 May 2019. Following an abdication ceremony on the afternoon of 30 April, Akihito's reign and the Heisei era continued until the end of the day. Naruhito then succeeded him as emperor at the beginning of the day on 1 May, ushering in the Reiwa era. The transition took place at midnight, and Naruhito formally began his reign in a ceremony later that morning. In his first statement as emperor, he pledged to reflect deeply on the course followed by his father, and fulfill his constitutional responsibility "as the symbol of the state and of the unity of the people of Japan".

Under Article 4 of the Japanese constitution, the emperor's role is defined as entirely ceremonial and representative. Unlike most other constitutional monarchs, the emperor lacks even nominal powers related to government; he is barred from making political statements. His role is limited to performing ceremonial duties as delineated by the constitution, and even then he is constrained by the requirements of the constitution and the binding advice of the cabinet. For instance, while he formally appoints the Prime Minister, he is constitutionally required to appoint the person designated by the National Diet.

The enthronement ceremony took place on 22 October 2019, where he was duly enthroned in an ancient-style proclamation ceremony. On 23 July 2021, the new emperor opened the 2020 Summer Olympics (originally scheduled to be played in 2020, postponed by the COVID-19 pandemic) hosted in Tokyo, just as his grandfather, Emperor Shōwa, had done in 1964.

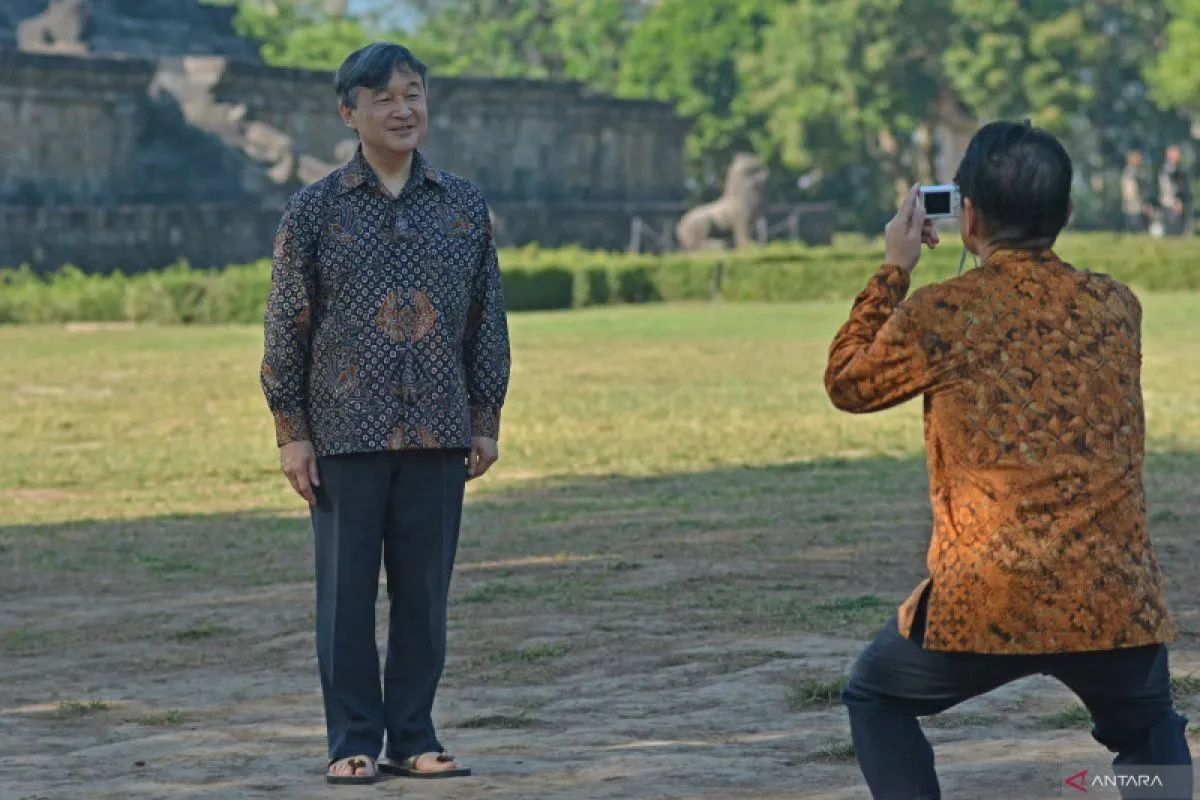
Emperor Naruhito (left) poses for a photo while visiting the Borobudur Temple Compounds in Magelang, Indonesia, June 2023

The imperial couple's first trip abroad as emperor and empress took place in September 2022, to the United Kingdom to attend the state funeral of Queen Elizabeth II. They visited Indonesia in June 2023, their first state visit.

In February 2024, the emperor marked his 64th birthday with a message mourning the victims of the Noto earthquake, and expressed desire to visit the affected areas. He had previously received condolences for the victims from King Charles III of the United Kingdom in early January. The emperor and empress visited Wajima and Suzu, two earthquake-stricken cities in the Noto Peninsula, on 22 March. The couple later visited an evacuation center in Anamizu on 12 April.

In April 2024, the Imperial Household Agency launched an Instagram account for the imperial family, which received 300,000 followers by the end of its debut on the platform. The account was reportedly launched to "reach out" to Japan's younger generations.

The Emperor and Empress embarked on a three-day state visit to the United Kingdom in late June 2024, at the invitation of King Charles III. The imperial couple had originally planned to visit in 2020 as guests of Queen Elizabeth II, but the state visit was cancelled due to the COVID-19 pandemic. The rescheduled visit went ahead despite concerns of postponement due to the British general election campaign that began in late May. It was the first state visit in modern times to take place during an active election campaign.

On 7 April 2025, the imperial couple visited Iwo Jima to commemorate the 80th anniversary of the Battle of Iwo Jima, in the first visit to the island by a Japanese monarch since 1994.

The Imperial Couple traveled to Mongolia for one week as state guests beginning on 6 July 2025; the timing was chosen based on the 80th anniversary of the end of World War II. Former Foreign Minister Taro Kono was named as the couple's chief attendant for the trip, which marked the first official visit to Mongolia by a Japanese Emperor. On the visit, the emperor and empress visited a memorial to Japanese prisoners of war who had been held in modern-day Mongolia, as well as attending Mongolia's annual Naadam festival.

== Selected works ==
- 1993 – Temuzu to tomoni: Eikoku no ninenkan (テムズとともに: 英国の二年間; OCLC 032395987)
- 2006 – The Thames and I: A Memoir of Two Years at Oxford with Hugh Cortazzi. Folkestone, Kent: Global Oriental. ISBN 978-1-905246-06-9; OCLC 65196090

== Titles, styles and honours ==
=== Titles and styles ===
- 23 February 1960 – 7 January 1989: His Imperial Highness Prince Hiro (浩宮徳仁親王殿下, Hiro-no-miya Naruhito shinnō denka)
- 7 January 1989 – 30 April 2019: His Imperial Highness The Crown Prince (皇太子殿下, Kōtaishi denka)
- 1 May 2019 – present: His Majesty The Emperor (天皇陛下, Ten'nō heika)

=== Honours ===
==== National ====
- The Golden Pheasant Award of the Scout Association of Japan (1989)

==== Foreign ====
- Austria: Grand Decoration of Honour for Services to the Republic of Austria in Gold with Sash (1999)
- Belgium: Grand Cordon of the Order of Leopold (22 October 1996)
- Brazil: Grand Collar of the Order of the Southern Cross (13 March 2025)
- Denmark: Knight of the Order of the Elephant (2004)
- Hungary: Grand Cross of the Order of Merit of the Republic of Hungary (2000)
- Italy: Knight Grand Cross of the Order of Merit of the Italian Republic (9 March 1982)
- Malaysia: Honorary Grand Commander of the Order of the Defender of the Realm (2012)
- Philippines:
  - Grand Collar of the Order of Sikatuna, Rank of Raja (3 December 2002)
  - Grand Collar of the Order of Lakandula, Rank of Supremo (27 May 2026)
- Portugal: Grand Cross of the Military Order of Christ (2 December 1993)
- Spain: Knight Grand Cross of the Order of Charles III (8 November 2008)
- Tonga:
  - Knight Grand Cross of the Royal Order of the Crown of Tonga (1 August 2008)
  - King Tupou VI Coronation Medal (4 July 2015)
- United Arab Emirates: Member 1st Class of the Order of Zayed (23 January 1995)
- United Kingdom: Stranger Knight Companion of the Order of the Garter (25 June 2024)

==== Honorary degrees ====
- 1991: University of Oxford, Doctor of Law

== See also ==
- List of current monarchs of sovereign states
- List of official overseas trips made by Naruhito
- List of state visits received by Naruhito

== Sources ==
- Hills, Ben (2006). Princess Masako: Prisoner of the Chrysanthemum Throne. Penguin. ISBN 978-1-5854-2568-6.

Naruhito Imperial House of Japan Born: 23 February 1960
Japanese royalty
Preceded by Akihito	Crown Prince of Japan; 7 January 1989 – 30 April 2019	Succeeded by Fumihito
Regnal titles
Preceded by Akihito	Emperor of Japan; 1 May 2019 – present	Incumbent; Heir presumptive: Fumihito
