= Child Museum (Cairo) =

Children's museum in Cairo, Egypt

Coordinates: 30.1005°N 31.3339°E

The Child Museum of Cairo, - The Children's Civilization and Creativity Center
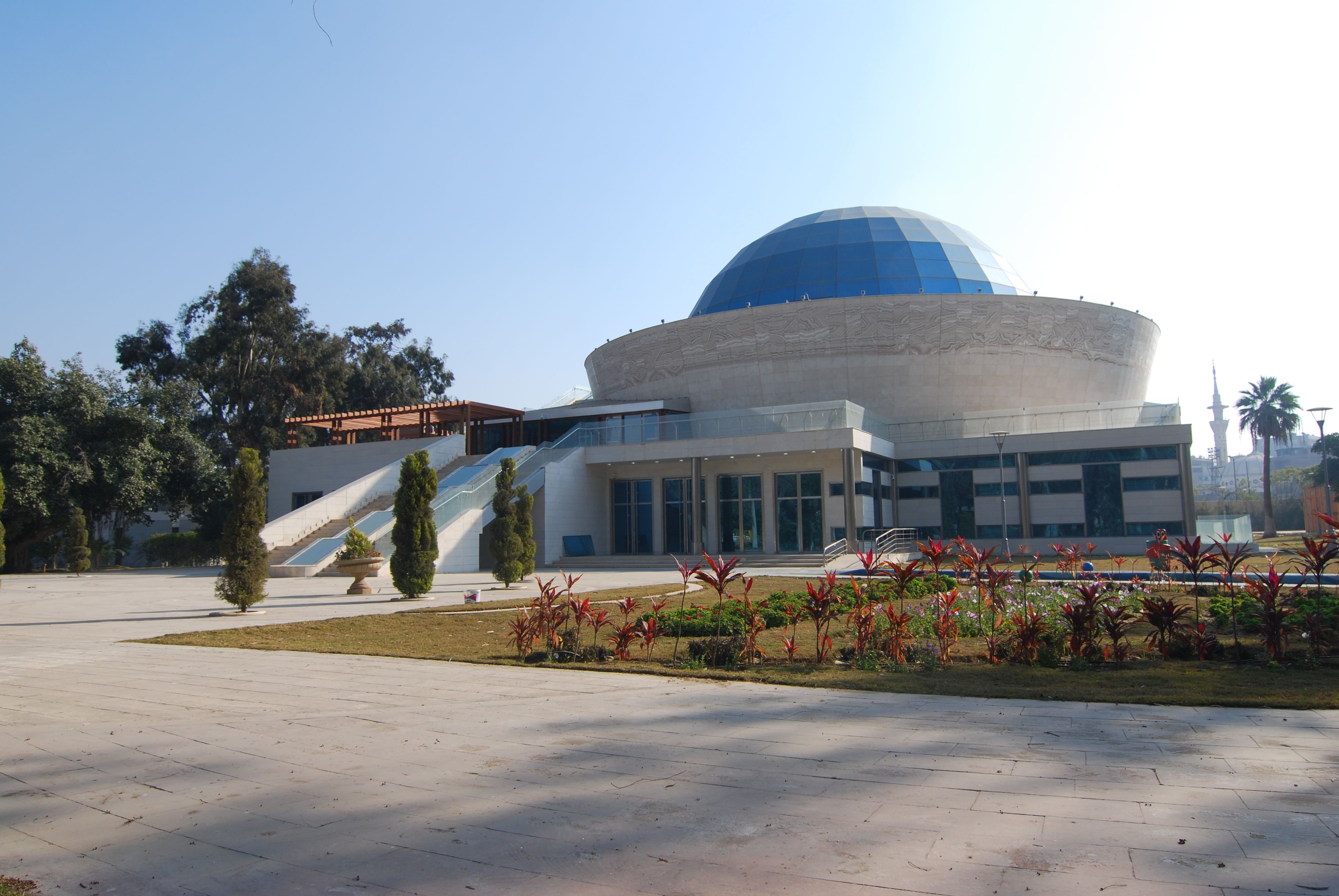
- Front Elevation
- Established: 1986; 40 years ago
- Location: 34, Abo Bakr EL Seddik Street Heliopolis, Cairo, Egypt
- Type: Children's museum. A hands-on experience of the history of Egyptian civilisation and its various subjects
- Visitors: 400,000 children a year
- Director: Dr Ossama Abdel Meguid
- Public transit access: Tram Station Haroun El Rashid
- Website: Child museum

The Children's Civilization and Creativity Center (Arabic: متحف الطفل بالقاهرة) is a children's museum in Heliopolis, Cairo, Egypt, established in 1986. It was renovated twice in 1996 and in 2012. It is a large museum and cultural center covering 4,000 square meters in a 14 Feddan, 14.3 acre landscape. It was built by the Heliopolis Society for the benefit of all the children of Egypt. This work involved contributions from Egyptian and international museums and institutions.

The museum was designed by experts from Egypt, UK and the USA and built by museum specialists from all over the world who have contributed to the museum to assist children and young adults to learn through hands on exhibits, inter-actives, computer games, and a spectacular dome show exhibit that takes the visitor through the history of science in Egypt.

In May 2012 it won the UK's Museum and Heritage International Award.

== Exterior ==
The entrance to the museum is from Sharia Abo Bakr El Seddik, opposite the tram station at Haroun El Rashid. The entrance is marked by the spectacular Space Pyramidion structure of planet spheres circling a pyramid that celebrates the cultures of Egypt ancient and modern. The visit to the museum begins with a journey down the Nile valley through time and space, it provides a living experience of how the Nile has changed and formed the landscape of modern Egypt. The journey begins at the fountain symbolic of the source of the Nile in Nubia, the rocks are carved with the dinosaurs and Basilosaurus that once lived and swam where modern Egypt is today. Their descendants, the Hippo and the Crocodile, greet the visitors, as the journey continues down the Nile path into the early period of the Nile's settlement by man, when the river banks were still humid jungle and elephants still wandered beside the Nile. Next the path leads onto the beginning of the drying out of the Nile Valley, when savannah formed on either bank, and lions, giraffes and gazelles appeared along the river bank. Continuing, the Nile path reaches the Pharaonic period, the surrounding landscape becomes desert, an oasis forms a small side garden with a desert encampment, while along the Nile, an Egyptian garden with 'T' basins filled with lotus and papyrus celebrates the diverse species cultivated. The path leads on past the medieval Nile village to the modern landscape of Heliopolis where the new museum building and the cinema are situated. Finally, on passing the museum the path finally leads to the Delta landscape, with the Alexandria seaside resort, and a covered Roman theatre for outdoor performances. The landscape path passes through a shady garden of mature trees, and both calms and stimulates the imagination of the visitor in anticipation for entering the new learning areas of the museum. The garden has a living display of birds, butterflies and fishes, and an outdoor excavation area. A large cafeteria allows for the schools, family groups and visitors to refresh themselves and so stay for the whole day. Outdoor classroom spaces provide for creativity and musical activities, while the cinema provides 3D learning films, and conference facilities, as well as book shop and learning materials supplies for the schools.

== Interior ==
The Interior exhibition is divided into four, each on a separate floor connected by the central spiral staircase - the Time Stair - that provides a path from the roof to the basement. The four themes are;

Where am I from? - explore the archaeology and history of Egypt, explores the pyramids, visits Tutankamen's tomb, and trains the visitor in mummy examination, modern excavation and underwater exploration in Alexandria

Who am I? - discover the development of Egyptian civilisation along the Nile divided into the three seasons of flood, sowing and harvest.

Why is Egypt like it is today? - examine the development of modern Egypt, in a panorama of Egyptian landscapes and their environmental issues, and how modern citizens can contribute today.

What is the future of Egypt? - Looks at the history of science in Egypt, through both a static hands on exhibition that looks at stars, ships, astrolabes, telescopes, airplanes and space travel, and also an immersive 4D experience dome show, in which the pioneers of Egypt appear to tell the history of science and encourage visitors to participate in the future.

The museum is open every day except Friday from 9 - 2.

== See also ==
- List of museums in Egypt
