= Suzanne Mubarak =

Former First Lady of Egypt (born 1941)

- سوزان مبارك
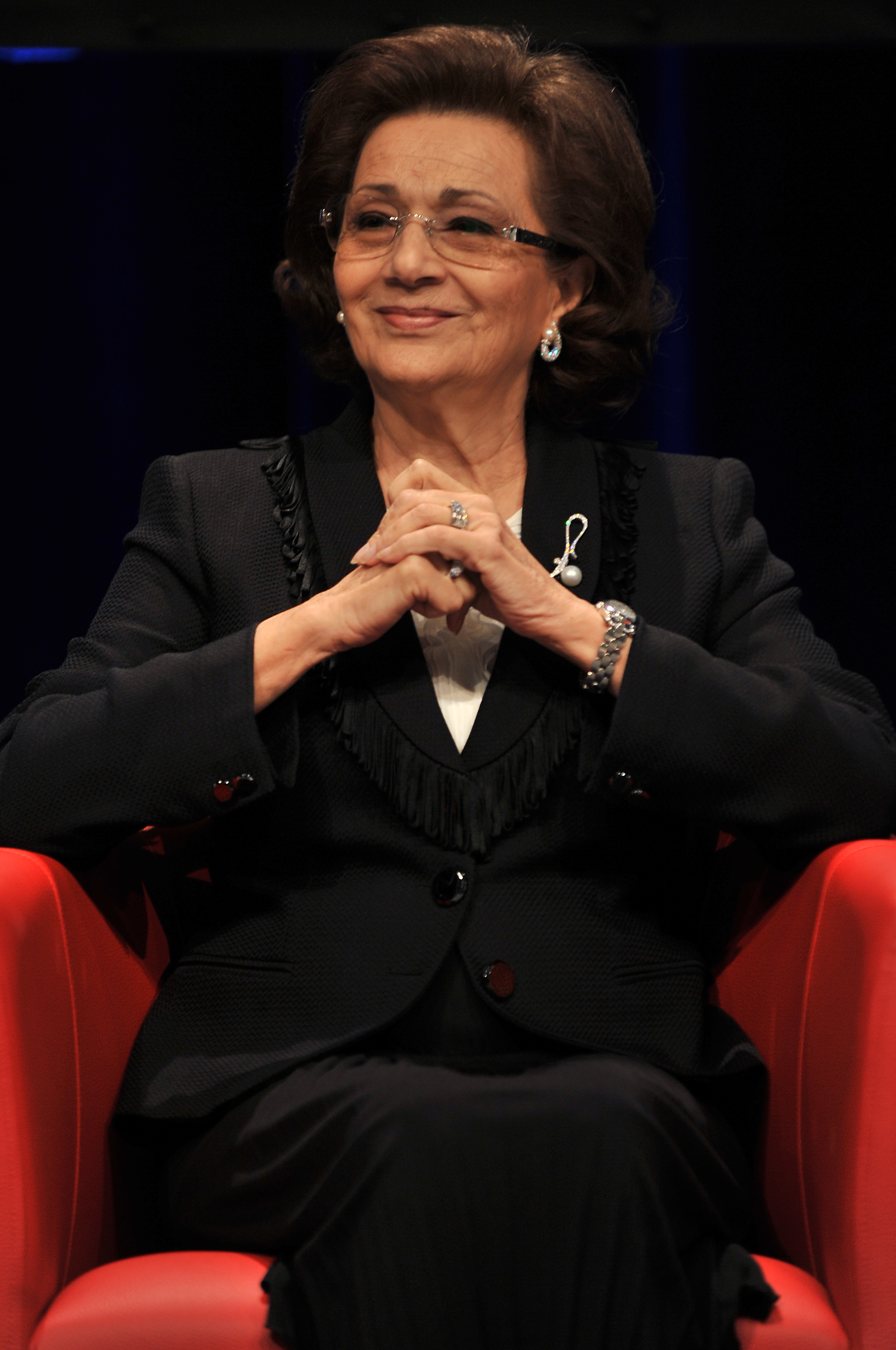
- Mubarak in 2010

First Lady of Egypt
- In role October 14, 1981 – February 11, 2011
- President: Hosni Mubarak
- Preceded by: Jehan Al Sadat
- Succeeded by: Naglaa Mahmoud

Personal details
- Born: Suzanne Saleh Thabet; 28 February 1941 (age 85) Al Minya Governorate, Kingdom of Egypt
- Spouse: Hosni Mubarak (m. 1959; died 2020)
- Children: Alaa; Gamal
- Education: American University in Cairo

Suzanne Saleh Mubarak (Arabic: سوزان مبارك [suˈzæːn moˈbɑːɾɑk], née Thabet [ثابت]; born 28 February 1941) is the widow of Egyptian former president Hosni Mubarak and was the First Lady of Egypt during her husband's presidential tenure from 14 October 1981 to 11 February 2011. She has served as Goodwill Ambassador of the United Nations Food and Agriculture Organization, and founded the Cairo Child Museum in collaboration with the British Museum.

== Early life and education ==
Suzanne Saleh Thabet was born in Al Minya Governorate, located on the Nile River about 250 kilometres to the south of Cairo, on 28 February 1941. She was the daughter of an Egyptian paediatrician, Saleh Thabet, and Welsh nurse Lily May Palmer, a native of Pontypridd. Her parents married in London in 1934, when Thabet was a medical student at Cardiff University and Palmer was a nurse working at The Infirmary on Camden Road, Islington. Suzanne's older brother, Mounir Sabet (1936–2024), was a former president of the Egyptian Olympic Committee. She attended St. Claire School in Heliopolis, Cairo.

She met her future husband, Egyptian Air Force officer Hosni Mubarak, when she was 16 years old. The couple married when she was 17 years old and had two sons; Alaa Mubarak and Gamal Mubarak. She returned to school ten years after her marriage.

Mubarak graduated from the American University in Cairo (AUC) in 1977 with a bachelor's degree in political science and then received a master's degree in sociology from AUC in 1982. Her thesis is entitled "Social Action Research in Urban Egypt: Case study of primary school upgrading in Bulaq".

== First Lady of Egypt ==
Mubarak became First Lady of Egypt upon her husband's accession to the presidency on 14 October 1981 and served as First Lady until her husband's resignation on 11 February 2011.

Mubarak's activities in projects relating to human trafficking and family affairs became prominent in Egypt. She led the Egyptian U.N. delegation in conferences relating to women and children. In 1985 she founded the Child Museum of Cairo in collaboration with the British Museum. In 2005, she opened the Hurghada branch of Mubarak's Public Library. In October 2008, she was nominated as Goodwill Ambassador of the Food and Agriculture Organization of the United Nations (FAO). She was a patron of the children's television series, Alam Simsim (Arabic for "Sesame's World"), Egypt's version of the American series, Sesame Street.

In March 2008, Egyptian journalist Ibrahim Eissa was arrested for reporting on Hosni Mubarak's health problems in August 2007. Mubarak then gave a rare television address to allege that Hosni was actually healthy and threaten punishment to reporters who suggested otherwise.

== Family ==
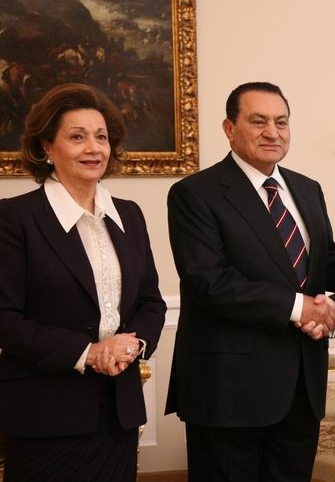
Hosni Mubarak and Suzanne Mubarak in 2008

Mubarak has two sons, Alaa and Gamal, a granddaughter, and three grandsons, one of whom, 12-year-old Muhammad Mubarak, died on 18 May 2009, in Paris after a two-day health crisis.

On 12 March 2021, the European Union lifted the sanctions against nine Egyptian individuals including the Mubarak family, in place since 2011.

== Honours ==
- 2006: Ibsen Centennial Commemoration Award, presented by Queen Sonja of Norway in Egypt on the occasion of the Ibsen Year
- The 1989 UNICEF Executive Board conferred upon Mubarak its highest honour, the "Maurice Pate Award", in recognition of her efforts for child survival, protection and development.
- Given the highest Award in 1989 by the Rehabilitation International Centre for her outstanding services and support to disabled children.
- Given an Honorary Fulbright Award, in recognition of her efforts in the field of child development and education,
- The "Together for Peace Foundation" bestowed upon Mubarak "The 1992 Enrique de la Mata International Prize for Peace" in recognition of her promotion of child development and alleviating the suffering of victims of natural disasters.
- The Rotary Foundation of Rotary International named Mubarak in 1992 a "Paul Harris Fellow" in appreciation of the assistance for the furthering of better understanding and friendly relations between peoples of the world.
- The "Health for All Gold Medal", the highest distinction awarded by the World Health Organization, was conferred upon Mubarak in June 1994 in recognition of her contributions to improving the quality of life of the women and children of Egypt and her commitment to international efforts aimed at integrating health in the development process.
- Mubarak received the International Book Committee, International Book Award in April 1995 in recognition of her efforts to promote reading in Egypt.
- Soka University bestowed upon Mubarak its Award of Highest Honour in April 1995.
- Westminster College, New Wilmington, honoured Mubarak with the degree of Doctor of Laws in recognition of her achievement for the people of Egypt and in causes valued by the international community.
- "The American World Book Association for Publication Award" in recognition of her role in the publication of books and her efforts in supporting the campaign of "Reading for All".
- "Award of the Arab Publishers Federation" in recognition of her efforts in promoting Arab literature. Cairo, 1996.
- The UNESCO Avicenna Medal in recognition of her role in promoting cultural activities in Egypt, 1997. The award "honours heads of state and other personalities who have made a significant contribution to the advancement of UNESCO’s goals".
- "Prize of Tolerance", European Academy of Sciences and Arts, Salzburg, 1998.
- "The Degree of Professor Counsellor", Shanghai University, April 1999.
- "Honorary Doctor Degree", Iwa University, Seoul, for her efforts to promote women's education and social development in Egypt, April 1999.
- The "Rotary Award" for her efforts in combating polio, June 1999.
- "Honorary Doctor Degree for Humane letters", American University in Cairo, February 2000.
- "Honorary Doctor Degree", American University in Spain, in recognition of her efforts in the social field in Egypt, February 2000.
- "Honorary Doctor Degree", Azerbaijan State Economic University, in recognition of activities in field of education and her efforts to protect and promote women and children rights across the Arab world. November 2009
- The Alexandria Regional Center for Women's Health and Development was formerly called The Suzanne Mubarak Regional Centre for Women's Health and Development, in recognition of her work on behalf of women in Egypt.
- In December 2006 Mubarak received the Dr Rainer Hildebrandt Human Rights Award endowed by Alexandra Hildebrandt.

Honorary titles
Preceded by Jehan Al Sadat	First Lady of Egypt; 1981–2011	Succeeded by Naglaa Ali Mahmoud
