= St. George's College, Cairo =

St. George's College (S.G.C.)
- Cairo; Egypt

Information
- Type: Private
- Established: 1934
- Language: English
- Nickname: S.G.C.

St. George's College is a boys' school that offers the basic three stages of the pre-university education system in Cairo, Egypt (kindergarten, primary, preparatory, and secondary education stages). The primary language of instruction is English; nevertheless, social studies are taught in Arabic. In addition, French is also taught as a second foreign language.

== History ==
S.G.C. is one of the oldest private English language schools in Cairo, as it was established in September 1934. And at that time it was located in Shubra.

In 1950, it was amalgamated with the smaller St. Austin's School, and was transferred to Heliopolis at Ismailia Square.

The school has two branches; one located in Heliopolis for kindergarten, primary, and preparatory stages, and one in Nasr City for kindergarten, primary and secondary stages.

== See also ==
- Category:St. George's College, Cairo alumni
- Education in Egypt
