= Ali Lotfi =

Ali Lotfi or Aly Lotfi may refer to:

- Ali Lotfi (film director), Iranian film director, film producer, and animator
- Ali Lotfi (footballer) (born 1989), Egyptian footballer who plays as a goalkeeper for Al Ahly in the Egyptian Premier League
- Aly Lotfy Mahmoud (1935–2018), Egyptian politician who served as Prime Minister of Egypt from in 1985 and 1986
