= Ali Lotfi (film director) =

- علی لطفی
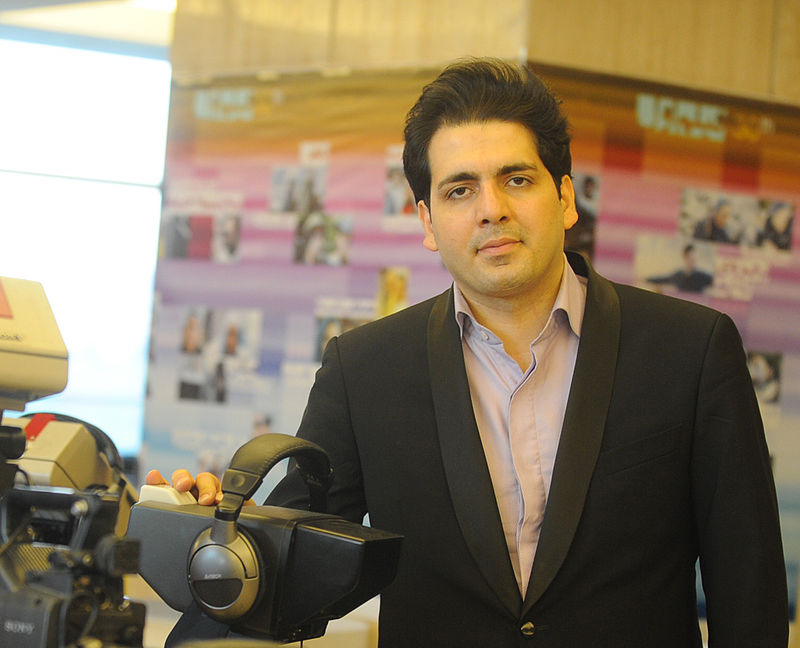
- Born: Ali Lotfi; Esfahan, Iran
- Occupations: Director, Producer, Animator
- Years active: 2004–present
- Website: http://www.pooyanama.com/

Ali Lotfi (Persian: علی لطفی, born in Esfahan) is an Iranian film director, film producer, and Animator.

== Filmography: Directing ==
1. Land of Sleep (sarzamin khab) (2012) - feature
2. Final dot (2009) - short
3. Red apple (Sibe sorkh) (2008) - short
4. Dash feri (2010) - short
5. Metro (2011) - short
6. Pardis (2011) - T-shirt

== Awards and honors ==
Ali lotfi has received numerous awards up to now. Here are a few:

- Fajr 30th Tehran Film Festival, 2012.
- International Children Film Festival, 2010.
