= Commission des Sciences et des Arts =

French science expedition in the Egypt

The Commission des Sciences et des Arts (Commission of the Sciences and Arts) was a French scientific and artistic institute. Established on 16 March 1798, it consisted of 167 members, of which all but 16 joined Napoleon Bonaparte's campaign in Egypt and produced the Description de l'Égypte (published in 37 Books from 1809 to around 1829). More than half were engineers and technicians, including 21 mathematicians, 3 astronomers, 17 civil engineers, 13 naturalists and mining engineers, geographers, 3 gunpowder engineers, 4 architects, 8 artists, 10 mechanical artists, 1 sculptor, 15 interpreters, 10 men of letters, 22 printers in Latin, Greek and Arabic characters. Bonaparte organised his scientific 'corps' like an army, dividing its members into 5 categories and assigning to each member a military rank and a defined military role (supply, billeting) beyond his scientific function.

== Members ==
Some members, like Geoffroy Saint-Hilaire, Monge, or Vivant Denon, are universally remembered but most have been all but forgotten. Some became members of the Institut d'Égypte.

- Pierre-Onésime Adnès the elder (1760–1819), mechanic
- Simon-Onésime Adnès, (1780–1820), mechanic
- François Sébastien Aimé (1762–1843), mechanic
- Bertrand Alibert (1775–1808), polytechnician (X 1794), engineer of the Ponts et Chaussées
- Felice Ansiglioni, printer (Oriental section)
- Antoine-Vincent Arnault (1766–1834), writer
- Pierre Arnollet (1776–1857), polytechnician (X 1796), engineer of the Ponts et Chaussées
- Charles-Louis Balzac (1752–1820), architect
- Pierre Joseph de Beauchamp (1752–1801), astronomer and diplomat
- Beaudoin, printer (French section)
- B. Belletête (1778–1808), orientalist and interpreter
- Denis Samuel Bernard (1776–1853), polytechnician (X 1794), engineer of the Ponts et Chaussées
- Claude Louis Berthollet (1748–1822), chemist
- Jacques Antoine Bertre (1776–1834), polytechnician (X 1794), geographical engineer
- Julien Bessières (1777–1840), surgeon
- Besson, printer (French section)
- Louis Victor Bodard (1765–1799), engineer of the Ponts et Chaussées
- A.-N.-F. Bonjean (1775–1845), marine engineer
- Mathurin-François Boucher (1778–1851), polytechnician (X 1794), ingénieur du génie maritime
- Jean-Baptiste Pierre Boudet (1748–1828), pharmacist in chief
- Boulanger, printer (French section)
- L. S. Bourgeois
- Boyer, printer (French section)
- Damien Bracevich (died 1830), interpreter
- Maximilien de Caffarelli du Falga, general
- Caquet (died 1799), artist
- Philippe Joseph Marie Caristie (1775–1852), polytechnicien (X 1794), engineer of the Ponts et Chaussées
- Jean-Jacques Castex (1731–1822), sculptor
- François-Charles Cécile (1766–1840), mechanic
- comte Jacques Joseph Gaspard Antoine Chabrol de Volvic (1773–1843), polytechnician (X 1794), engineer of the Ponts et Chaussées
- père Jacques-Pierre Champy (1744–1816), chemist
- Nicolas Champy (1776–1801), polytechnicien (X 1794), chemist
- Jean-Siméon Champy (1778–1845), polytechnicien (X 1794), gunpowder commissaire
- Jean François Chaumont (1774–1856), polytechnicien (X 1795), marine engineer
- Callixte-Victor Cirot (died 1801), mechanic
- Jean Colin (died 1801), mechanic
- H. V. Collet-Descotils (1773–1815), chemist
- Nicolas-Jacques Conté (1755–1805), director of mechanics
- Ernest Coquebert de Monbret (1780–1801), botanist
- Jean Baptiste Corabœuf (1777–1859), polytechnician (X 1794), capitaine en premier dans le corps des ingénieurs géographes
- Louis Alexandre de Corancez (1770–1832), geometer
- Pierre Louis Antoine Cordier (1777–1861), mineralogist
- Louis Costaz (1767–1842), geometer
- Jean-Marie-Joseph Coutelle (1748–1835), adjunct to the director of mechanics
- Couvreur, mechanic
- Jacques-Denis Delaporte (1777–1861), orientalist
- Dominique Vivant Denon (1747–1825), writer, artist
- Desfours, mechanic
- A. J. Dewèvre (1775–1799), surgeon
- Déodat Gratet de Dolomieu (1750–1801), mineralogist and geologist
- G. de Dominicis, printer (Oriental section)
- Antoine Dubois (1756–1837), doctor
- Isidore Dubois (born 1782), surgeon
- Nicolas Dubois (born 1776), polytechnician (X 1794), printer (French section)
- Jean-Marie Dubois-Aymé (1779–1846), engineer of the Ponts et Chaussées
- Louis Duchanoy (1781–1847), engineer of the Ponts et Chaussées
- Jacques Auguste Dulion (1776–1798), polytechnician (X 1795)
- Victor Dupuis (1777–1861), polytechnician (X 1794), ingénieur géographe
- André Dutertre (1753–1842), painter
- Léonard Duval (1768–1798), engineer of the Ponts et Chaussées
- Ch. M. Eberhardt (born 1782), printer (French section)
- Elias Fatalla, head of the printer (Oriental section)
- J.-P. Faurie (1760–1799), geographical engineer
- Louis Joseph Favier (1776–1855), polytechnician (X 1796), engineer of the Ponts et Chaussées
- Hervé Charles Antoine Faye (1763–1825), engineer of the Ponts et Chaussées
- J.-L. Féraud (1750–1809)
- Jean Baptiste Simon Fèvre (1775–1850), polytechnician (X 1794), engineer of the Ponts et Chaussées
- Pierre Denis Fouquet, artist
- Joseph Fourier (1768–1830), geometer
- Antoine Galland (1763–1851), printer (French section)
- Étienne Geoffroy Saint-Hilaire (1772–1844), naturalist
- Alexandre Sébastien Gérard (1779–1853), polytechnician (X 1798), naturalist
- Pierre-Simon Girard (1765–1835), chief engineer of the Ponts et Chaussées
- Alexis Gloutier (1758–1800), administrator
- Philippe Greslé (1776–1846), polytechnician (X 1795), shipbuilder
- Jean Charles Hassenfratz (1766–1834), mechanic
- François Michel Hérault (died 1800), mechanic
- Jean-Baptiste Hochu (born 1775), mechanic
- Pierre Jacotin (1765–1827), geographical engineer
- Jardin, printer (French section)
- Pierre Amédée Jaubert (1779–1847), orientalist and interpreter
- Jean-Baptiste Prosper Jollois (1776–1842), polytechnician (X 1794), engineer of the Ponts et Chaussées, entrusted with the hydraulic works in the Nile Delta
- Louis Auguste Joly (1774–1798), painter
- Edme François Jomard (1777–1862), polytechnician (X 1794), geographical engineer and archaeologist
- Jean-Baptiste Jomard (1780–1868), student geographical engineer
- Jean Joseph Labâte (1766–1835), doctor
- Jean-Baptiste Lacipière (born 1776), surgeon
- Michel Ange Lancret (1774–1807), polytechnician (X 1794), engineer of the Ponts et Chaussées
- X. Laporte (died 1799), printer (French section)
- François Laroche (1778–1806), polytechnician (X 1795), geographical engineer
- Le Brun (died 1801)
- Bienheureux Lecesne (1772–1827), geographical engineer
- Louis Marie Leduc (born 1772), antiquary
- Pierre Eustache Leduc (died 1799), geographical engineer
- Lenoble, interpreter
- Pierre Lenoir (1776–1827), mechanic
- Jean-Baptiste Lepère (1761–1844), architect
- Gratien Le Père (1769–1832), chief engineer of the Ponts et Chaussées
- Jacques-Marie Le Père (1763–1841), chief engineer of the Ponts et Chaussées
- Lerouge (died 1801), chemist
- Lethioux, printer (French section)
- J. F. L. Levesque (born 1760), geographical engineer
- Santi Jean-Baptiste L'Homaca, interpreter
- Amable Nicolas Lhomond (1770–1854), mechanic
- F. Maccagni (1763–1846), printer (Oriental section)
- Jean-Joseph Marcel (1776–1854), director of printers
- Marlet, printer (French section)
- Pierre-Dominique Martin (1771–1855), engineer of the Ponts et Chaussées
- Jérôme Isaac Méchain (1778–1851), astronome
- Antonio Mesabki, imprimeur section orientale
- Benoît Marie Moline de Saint-Yon (1780–1842), polytechnician (X 1794), engineer of the Ponts et Chaussées
- Gaspard Monge, comte de Péluse (1746–1818), mathematician
- Hippolyte Nectoux (1759–1836), botanist
- Charles Norry (1756–1832), architect
- Nicolas-Antoine Nouet (1740–1811), astronomer
- Panhusen (died 1798), orientalist and interpreter
- François-Auguste Parseval-Grandmaison (1759–1834), writer
- L. Pellegrini, printer (Oriental section)
- Charles Plazanet (1773–1868), mechanic
- Paul Nicaise Pottier (1778–1842), polytechnician (X 1794), engineer of the Ponts et Chaussées
- Roland Victor Pottier (1775- ?), polytechnician (X 1795), ingénieur géographe
- François Pouqueville (1770–1838), surgeon
- Pourlier, antiquary
- Jean Constantin Protain (1769–1837), architect
- J.-J. Puntis (1758–1812), printer (French section)
- François Marie Quenot (born 1761), astronomer
- Alire Raffeneau-Delile (1778–1850), botanist
- Adrien Raffeneau-Delile (1773–1843), engineer of the Ponts et Chaussées
- Louis Rémy Raige (1777–1810), orientalist
- Henri-Joseph Redouté (1766–1852), painter
- Michel-Louis-Étienne Regnaud de Saint-Jean d'Angély (1762–1819), politician
- Joseph Angélique Sébastien Regnault (1776–1823), polytechnicien (X 1794), engineer of the Ponts et Chaussées, adjunct to Bertholet and entrusted with controlling the currency in Cairo
- G. Renno (1777–1848), printer (Oriental section)
- Henri Jean Rigel (1772–1852), compositor
- Michel Rigo (1770–1815), painter
- Louis Ripault (1775–1823), antiquary
- Rivet, printer (French section)
- Alexandre Roguin (born 1771), pharmacist
- N. Roselli, printer (French section)
- Pierre Charles Rouyer (1769–1831), pharmacist
- François Michel de Rozière (1773–1842), mining engineer
- C. Ruga, printer (Oriental section)
- Alexandre de Saint-Genis (1772–1834), polytechnician (X 1794), engineer of the Ponts et Chaussées
- André Louis de Saint-Simon (died 1799), knight of Malta
- Marie Jules César Lelorgne de Savigny (1777–1851), zoologist
- Pierre Simonel (died 1810), geographical engineer
- Jean-Lambert Tallien (1767–1820), National Convention member
- Dominique Testevuide (1735–1798), chief geographical engineer
- Claude François Thévenod (1772–1798), polytechnicien (X 1794), engineer of the Ponts et Chaussées
- Jean Michel de Venture de Paradis (1739–1799), chief interpreter
- Very, printer (French section)
- Jacques Antoine Viard (1783–1849), student of the École nationale des ponts et chaussées
- René Édouard de Villiers du Terrage (1780–1855), polytechnician (X 1794), inspector general of the Ponts et Chaussées, employed in leveling the Suez isthmus
- Guillaume André Villoteau (1759–1839), musicographer
- Jean Pierre Séraphin Vincent (1779–1818), polytechnician (X 1796), marine engineer
- Louis Vincent (born 1780), engineer of the Ponts et Chaussées
