= International Commission for the piercing of the isthmus of Suez =

1855 organization

The International Commission for the piercing of the isthmus of Suez (Commission Internationale pour le percement de l'isthme de Suez) was the commission consisting of various European experts convened in 1855 by Ferdinand de Lesseps as instructed by the viceroy of Egypt Muhammad Sa'id in order to ascertain the feasibility of a canal between the Mediterranean and the Red Sea and to evaluate the best alternative for such a canal.

The commission was solely composed of Europeans. There were no Egyptians on the commission.

== Preliminary events ==
The idea of digging a canal through the isthmus of Suez was attracting widespread interest throughout Europe in the early 19th century. Interest grew amid European imperial expansion into Asia in the 19th century.

Napoleon's surveyors in his Campaign in Egypt had found a difference of some 9 m between the levels of the two seas. The surveys made by Paul-Adrien Bourdaloue in 1847 during an expedition of the Société d'Études du Canal de Suez were the first generally accepted evidence that there was in fact no such difference. During the same expedition, Alois Negrelli, the Austrian railroad pioneer, explored the bay of Pelusium at the northern end of the anticipated canal. However, due to the political disturbances of 1848, the ideas were not pursued any further. On 30 November 1854, De Lesseps obtained from Muhammad Sa'id the first concession for a Suez Canal and on De Lesseps' request, a first draft of the canal was made by Linant-Bey and Mougel-Bey (Linant de Bellefonds and Eugène Mougel), two high level French engineers in the Egyptian canal administration. From the outset, De Lesseps' main concern was to put the canal project on a political basis as wide as possible. Thus, in his second, more detailed firman of 19 May 1855, the viceroy ordered to further elaborate the initial draft and to submit it to an international commission of experts for discussion and evaluation.

== Commission ==
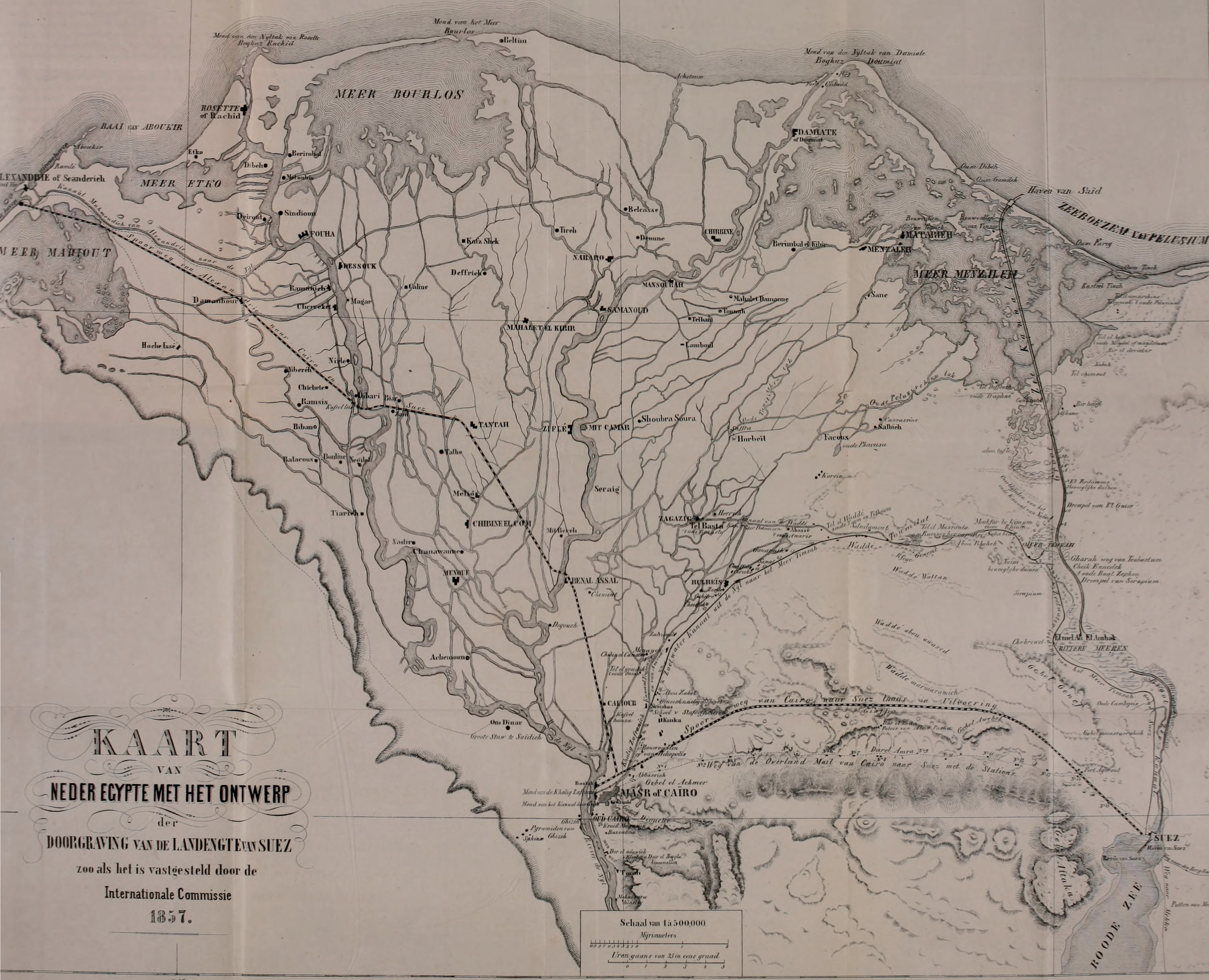
Map of the Nile delta and the designed canal (from the book of Conrad)

The Commission first convened in Paris on 30 October 1855. It consisted of Messrs.

- Frederik Willem Conrad Jr (Note: He is often confused with his nephew Jan Frederik Willem Conrad, who in 1888 became member of the supervision committee of the Convention of Constantinople to oversee the free access to the Suez Canal)(Chairman), a Dutch engineer
- Captain Edward Harris, a British naval commander
- Benjamin Jaurès (Paris),
- Carl Lentze, a Prussian engineer
- Jean-Pierre Lieussou, a French scientist
- John Robinson McClean, a British engineer
- Charles Manby, a British engineer
- Cipriano Segundo Montesino, a Spanish engineer
- Alois Negrelli, a Tyrolean engineer
- Pietro Paleocapa, an Italian engineer
- Louis Auguste Renaud (Paris),
- James Meadows Rendel, a British surveyor
- Charles Rigault de Genouilly, a French military officer

The members had already viewed the initial draft of Linant-Bey and Mougel-Bey and decided to investigate the circumstances on the spot in Egypt. In addition, a map of the bay of Pelusium was to be drawn up in order to complete the soundings made by Negrelli in 1847.

== Investigations in Egypt ==
Five of the thirteen members met on 18 November 1855 in Alexandria, namely Messrs. Conrad, Renaud, Negrelli, McClean and Lieussou. Negrelli provided the soundings and the alignment of the canal which he had drawn up during his visit of 1847 and which corresponded to a large extent to the draft made by Linant and Mougel. During the next two days, the group examined the harbour and roads of Alexandria, and then went on to explore the bay of Suez over four days.

Subsequently, they went north to Lake Timsah and the Wadi Tumilat to undertake boreholes and subsoil investigations and to examine the line of a canal across the Nile delta to Alexandria proposed by Jacques-Marie Le Père and by Paulin Talabot. The members of the group did not take long to consent that this proposition was unacceptable for various technical and economical reasons. They then proceeded towards the Mediterranean, making further boreholes and investigations. On 31 December 1855, the group was taken on board the Egyptian frigate Le Nil and arrived in Alexandria on 2 January 1856. The discussion on further soundings made in the meantime by Mr. Larousse, a French navy hydrologist seconded to the commission, came to the conclusion that the entrance to the canal should be moved further to the west (at what is now Port Said) because of the deeper waters, even if this added 6 km to the length of the canal. In addition, it was proposed that the entrance should be protected by a 3.5 km long northern jetty and a 2.5 km long southern jetty, and that a lighthouse should be built.

On 2 January 1856, a preliminary report was submitted to the Viceroy stating that a direct canal across the isthmus was the only reasonable alternative, but that the details would have to be set out in a final report on the basis of further investigations. The viceroy then issued the second concession to De Lesseps.

== The commission's deliberations ==
The complete commission convened again on 23 June 1856 in Paris (Rendel was excused, Negrelli and Montesino arrived the following day). Over three days, the members discussed the result of the investigations in Egypt and all details of the future canal. The unanimous vote was for a canal as suggested by Negrelli from the outset, i.e. a canal without locks, passing the lower level Bitter Lakes (to be flooded by the canal) without any dams or dikes. The canal should have a depth of 8 m and its width should be 100 metres at water level and 64 metres at the bottom, however, in a certain section only 80 m at water level and 44 m at the bottom.

=== Options Proposed by John Robinson McClean and Charles Manby ===
In his 1864 presidential address to the Institution of Civil Engineers, John Robinson McClean detailed his view of the two contrasting systems proposed for the construction of the Canal. Both McClean and Manby dissented from the conclusions of the majority of the commissioners on the nature of the project, instead proposing a canal elevated twenty-five feet above sea level, utilising locks similar to those in the Caledonian Canal. This was in contrast to the majority conclusion which favoured a sea-level canal without locks. The comparison of these systems was part of an appendix in McClean's 1864 address and detailed his opinions on both proposals, as summarised below.

==== First System (Adopted by Majority of Commissioners) ====
- The level of the canal would align with the low water level of the Mediterranean Sea at Said.
- The total excavation required was estimated at 130 million cubic metres, half of which would need dredging.
- Considerable difficulty was anticipated in forming the harbour of Suez due to the potential presence of coral reefs and indurated sands.
- A significant cost and dredging effort were required to establish a port in Lake Timsah.

==== Second System (Proposed by McClean and Manby) ====
- The canal's water level would be 7 metres above the low water level of the Mediterranean Sea.
- The total embankment required would not exceed 70 million cubic metres, significantly reduced by judicious selection of the canal line.
- The excavation would be entirely above natural drainage, facilitating rapid construction using railways and locomotive engines.
- The formation of the Suez Harbour would circumvent the need for dredging, employing locks in deep water instead.
- The higher canal level at Port Timsah negates the need for locks at this point, reducing construction costs.
- An innovative irrigation approach proposed using the canal to draw water directly from the Nile, avoiding the need for a separate conduit and enabling its use as a reservoir during Nile inundations.
- The high-level system would avoid water supply issues like salt deposits and tidal dependencies, inherent in the low-level system.

=== British opposition to the canal ===
British proposals continued to insist that there was a difference in water level between the Red and Mediterranean Seas of some 7 metres, despite the fact that survey work as early as 1847 had shown this not to be the case. Opposition to the canal from British engineers including McClean, Manby, and Robert Stephenson appeared in various engineering publications in Britain and further afield. Stephenson spoke in Parliament against possible involvement in a Suez canal scheme in 1857 and 1858.

In addition to opposition from British engineers, the wider British establishment, including notably Lord Palmerston, had ruthlessly opposed the construction of the canal, fearing it's accessibility to seagoing vessels of all nations would threaten Britain's commercial interests (such as control of the Cape Route along with overland routes to India and the Far East), and British naval supremacy. The British Government would later publicise and object to the use of forced labour in the construction of the canal, despite the fact that the British themselves had used forced labour in the construction of a railway between Alexandria and Cairo, which opened in 1854, being extended to Suez in 1858.

== Final report ==
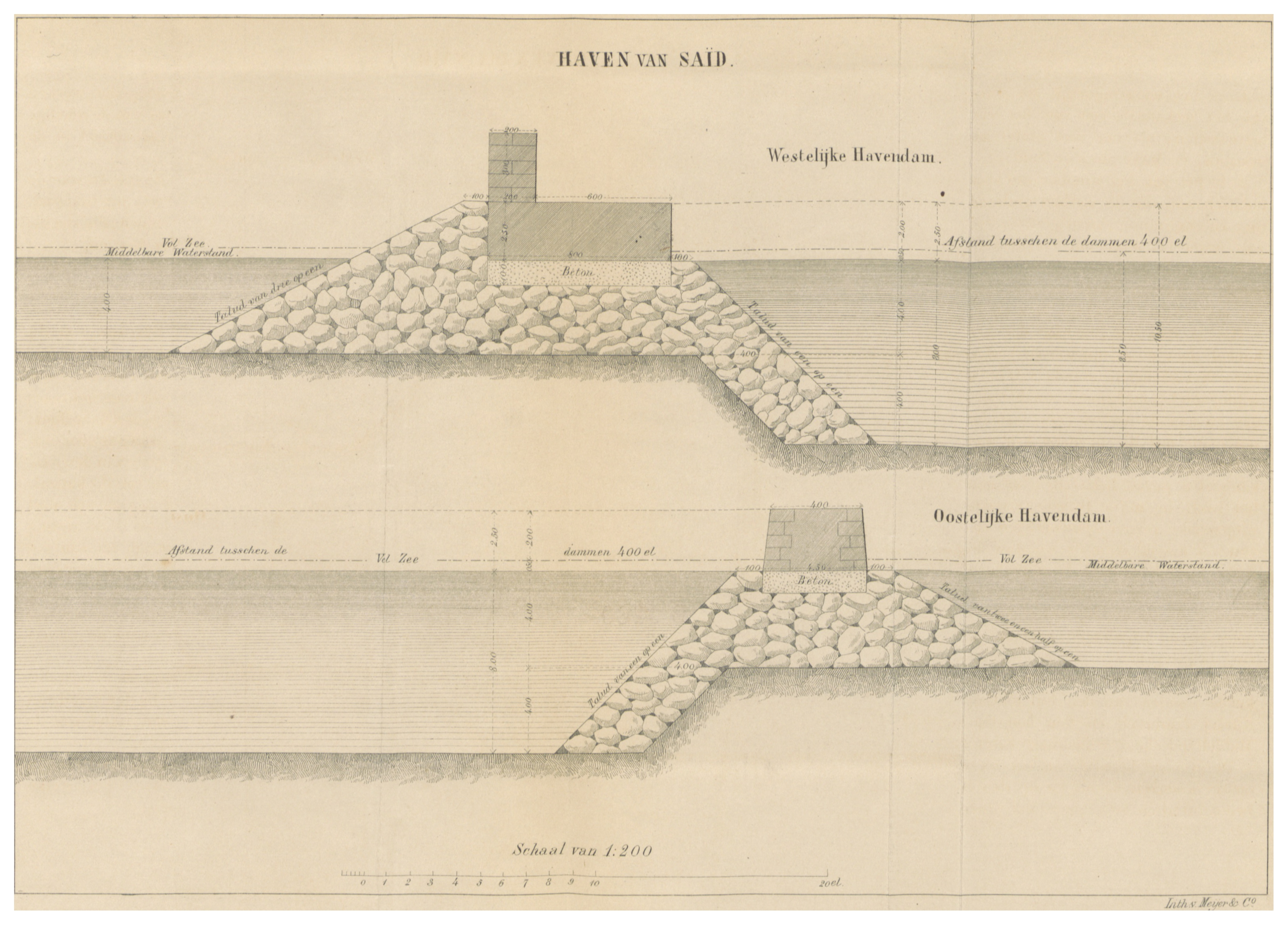
Design of the breakwaters of Port Said

The final report contained 195 pages plus plans, technical tables etc., was published in December 1856 and accepted by the Khedive. The report contains the reasoning for the direct connection between the two seas and all technical details of the canal, including ports to be built, telegraph lines to be installed along the canal, ferries to be introduced and finally the lighting of the Mediterranean coast and of the whole of the Red Sea to be provided, complete with lighthouses, buoys and so on. As already mentioned in the preliminary report, the name of Port Said was suggested as the name for the port on the northern entrance.

Key resolutions included the decision against continuous embankments in areas where the canal traversed the Bitter Lakes, deeming them unnecessary. The report also determined that locks at the canal's extremities were not required, as the lakes would mitigate tidal currents. It specified the canal's dimensions, recommending a depth of 8 metres (approximately 26.4 feet), with a width sufficient to accommodate two passing vessels and a third stationary line.

The proposed width was approximately 64 metres (210 feet) at the bottom and 97.5 metres (320 feet) at the top between the Red Sea and the Bitter Lakes, and approximately 43.9 metres (144 feet) at the bottom and 79.9 metres (262 feet) at the top between the Bitter Lakes and the Mediterranean.

The Commission favoured constructing jetties directly seaward of Port Said, over an earlier proposal near the Gulf of Pelusium. This decision, influenced by the recommendations of Mr. Larousse, a French Navy hydrographer, was based on finding an adequate depth of 8 metres closer to Port Said than the initially proposed eastern entrance. Considering the cost implications of jetty construction and the advantageous steep sea-bed slope, the choice of Port Said was deemed prudent.

At Port Said, the jetties' design, including their length and construction method, was later adopted based on the advice of Mr. Pascal, Inspector-General of Roads and Bridges. At Port Tewfik, the construction of a single jetty was deemed sufficient. There was consensus on the arrangement of necessary inner harbour works at both canal ends. The western and eastern jetties at Port Said were recommended to be approximately 2987 metres (9,800 feet) and 1829 metres (6,000 feet) respectively, with a starting width of approximately 1280 metres (4,200 feet) and an ending separation of approximately 701 metres (2,300 feet). The channel alongside the western jetty was to be approximately 100.6 metres (330 feet) wide and 9.1 metres (30 feet) deep, oriented northeast by 2 degrees north.

In the report, the commission expressly declared to have fulfilled their duties and to have finalised all their activities. They expressed their desire to have the canal be built in the near future, but have not in any way commented on the execution of the future works or on their management.

== Sources ==
A comprehensive final report, together with the investigation journal and the minutes of the full commission’s deliberations, was published by Lesseps. Negrelli provided details of the proposed canal to the K.K. Geographische Gesellschaft (Imperial Royal Geographical Society) in Vienna, and provided them with a copy of the commission’s final report. The society subsequently published this material in its own proceedings.
