= Suez (disambiguation) =

Suez is a seaport town in north-eastern Egypt.

Suez may also refer to:

== Geography ==
- Gulf of Suez, at the northern end of the Red Sea
- Isthmus of Suez, land strip connecting the continents of Africa and Asia
- Suez Canal, an artificial sea-level waterway in Egypt, connecting the Mediterranean Sea to the Red Sea
- Suez Port, a port located at the southern boundary of Suez Canal

== Other uses ==
- Suez Company (1858–1997), a French corporation
- Suez (company, 1997–2008), a successor French multinational corporation
- Suez (company, 2015), formerly Suez Environnement, a former division of the previous company
- Suez Group (political faction), part of the UK Conservative Party in the 1950s
- Suez (film), a 1938 epic film starring Tyrone Power and Loretta Young
- Suez Cement, an Egyptian football club based in Suez
- Suez Stadium, a multi-use stadium in Suez
- Suez SC, a sports club

== See also ==
- Suez Crisis, a war fought in Egypt in 1956
- Suez Canal (disambiguation)
