= Negrelli =

Negrelli is an Italian surname. Notable people with the surname include:

- Alois Negrelli (1799–1858), Italian engineer
- Leo Negrelli (died 1974), Italian journalist

== See also ==
- Negrelli Viaduct, in Prague
