= Jean-Baptiste Lepère =

French architect

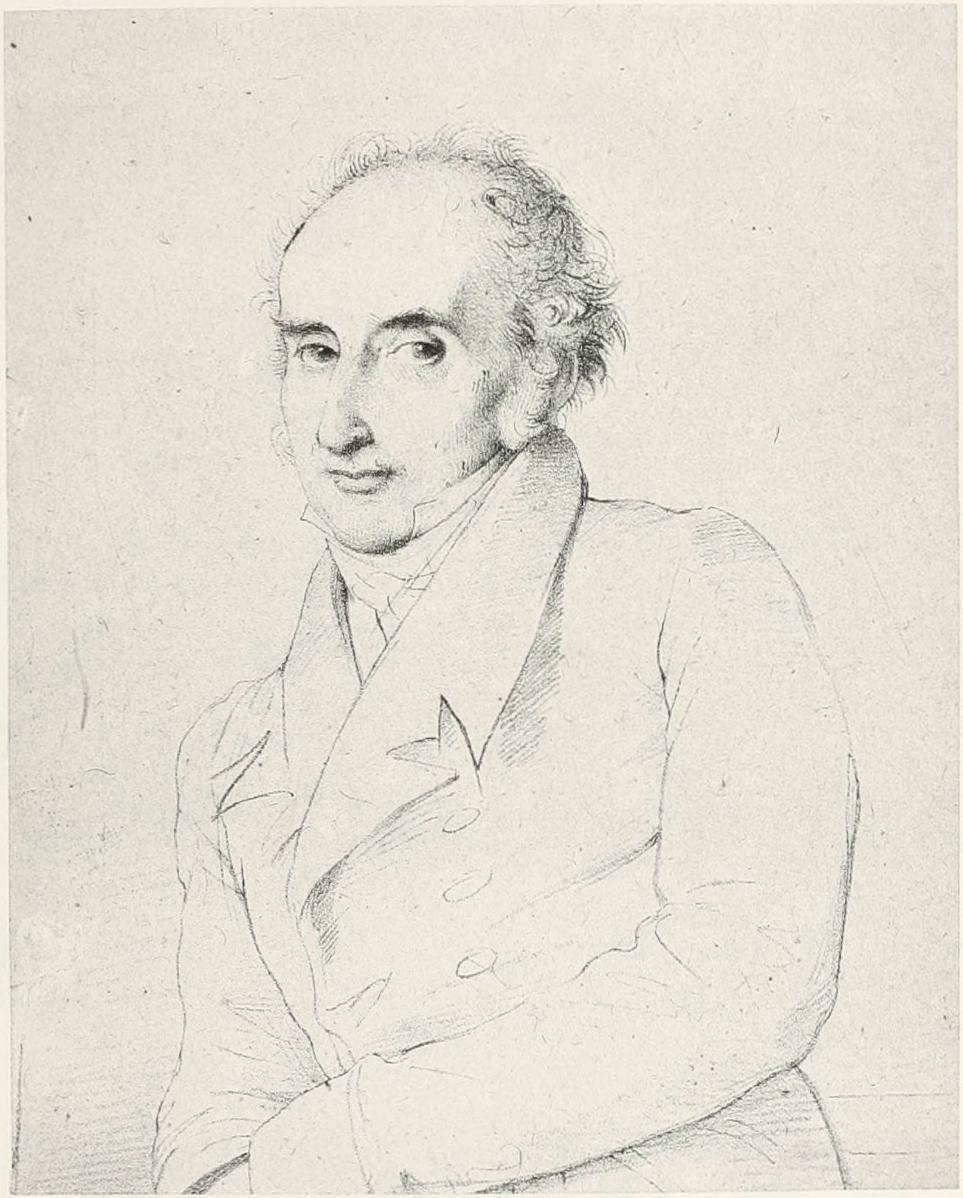
- Born: December 1, 1761; Paris
- Died: July 16, 1844 (aged 82); Paris
- Occupation: Architect

Jean-Baptiste Lepère (December 1, 1761 – July 16, 1844) was a French architect, father-in-law of the architect Jacques Hittorff. He was the designer of the Palace of Fontainebleau and the church of Saint-Vincent-de-Paul, Paris, largely revised by Hittorf during its protracted execution, and one of the architects who worked on raising the colonne Vendôme.

Lepère was one of the many members of the Commission des Sciences et des Arts taken by Bonaparte on his Egyptian Expedition. While there, Lepère also produced drawings of ancient Egyptian temples and other remains.

Other members of this commission were Jacques-Marie Le Père (1763–1841) and his brother Gratien Le Père (1769–1826), engineers and surveyors, who were to see whether Napoleon's planned project of linking the Mediterranean Sea with the Red Sea across the Nile Delta could be realised and if the difference in sea level between the two was sufficiently small to make such a canal possible.
