= Suez Canal (disambiguation) =

The Suez Canal is commercial waterway connecting the Mediterranean Sea and the Red Sea. Suez Canal may also refer to:

- Suez Canal Authority, which owns and maintains the Suez Canal
- Suez Canal Bridge, which crosses the Suez Canal
- Suez Canal Company, the French corporation that constructed the Suez Canal
- Suez Canal Stadium, a stadium located in Suez
- Suez Canal University, a university serving the Suez area
- Suez Canal Container Terminal, a shipping terminal at the northern end of the canal

== See also ==
- Suez Canal overhead line crossing, an important electrical power line built across the Suez Canal
- Suez Canal Area Development Project, an Egyptian mega-project around the Suez
- Société d'Études du Canal de Suez, the French society to study the possibility of building a Suez Canal
- New Suez Canal, an Egyptian development project
- Suez (disambiguation)
