= Cipriano Segundo Montesino =

Spanish engineer and politician

The Most Excellent Cipriano Segundo Montesino y Estrada Duke Consort of la Victoria
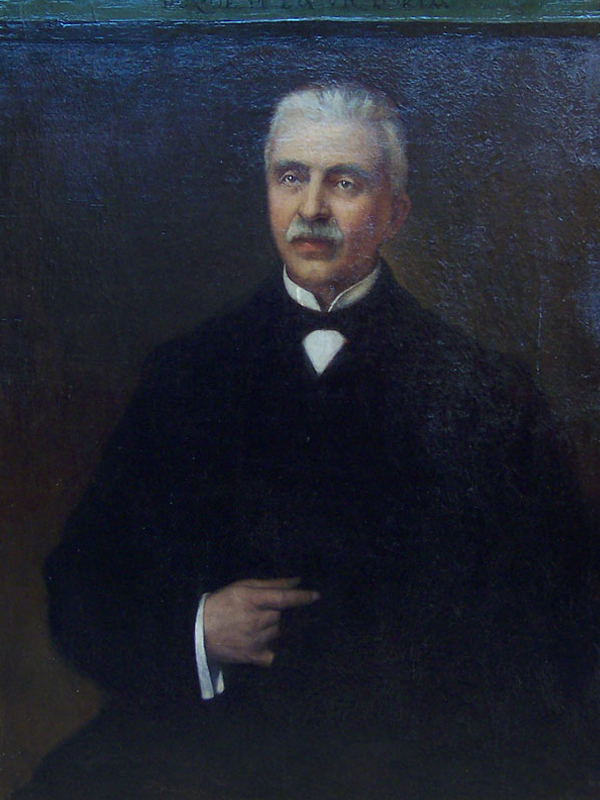
- Cipriano Segundo Montesino y Estrada
- Born: 26 September 1817; Valencia de Alcántara, Spain
- Died: 27 August 1901 (aged 83); Madrid, Spain
- Education: Grupo de Escuelas Centrales; École Centrale Paris
- Occupations: Civil engineer, Politician
- Notable work: Contributions to the development of railway systems International Commission for the piercing of the isthmus of Suez
- Office: Senator of Spain for the Royal Academy of Exact, Physical and Natural Sciences (1881-1901)
- Term: President of the Royal Academy of Exact, Physical and Natural Sciences (1882-1901)
- Spouse: Eladia Fernández de Espartero y Blanco
- Children: Pablo Montesino Espartero
- Parent: Pablo Montesino Cáceres
- Awards: Gran Cruz de la Orden Civil de María Victoria (1872); Cross of Military Merit (1874)
- Scientific career
- Workplaces: Senate of Spain; Royal Academy of Exact, Physical, and Natural Sciences

Cipriano Segundo Montesino y Estrada (26 September 1817 – 27 August 1901) was a Spanish civil engineer and politician. He was a founding committee member of the Royal Academy of Exact, Physical, and Natural Sciences, serving as vice-president and president, and also as a Senator appointed by the academy. He also served as the vice-president of the Senate of Spain.

== Biography ==
Montesino y Estrada was born on 26 September 1817 in Valencia de Alcántara, the son of Pablo Montesino Cáceres, a physician and deputy for Extremadura. Political exile brought about by the reinstatement of Absolutism in Spain saw the family move to Jersey in 1823. He began his education in Jersey, moving to London for further studies.

He graduated in civil engineering from the École Centrale Paris in 1837, after returning to Spain upon the death of Ferdinand VII in 1833. After further studies in London, he returned again to Spain in 1839, joining the National Militia and the Progressive Party. He played a significant role in political events and was appointed as a public official. A significant figure in Spain's liberal reforms, he was a founder member of the Royal Academy of Exact, Physical, and Natural Sciences, becoming its president in 1882.

He was also a member of various national and international scientific societies, served as the Director-General of Public Works in Spain, and was awarded the Order of Charles III.

He was a member of the International Commission for the piercing of the isthmus of Suez, and published papers in the Spanish civil engineering journal, Revista de Obras Públicas, on the subject of the canal.

He married Eladia Fernández de Espartero y Blanco, the niece of General Baldomero Espartero, upon whose death Eladia inherited the titles of Duchess of Victoria and second Countess of Luchana, with Montesino y Estrada becoming the Duke Consort. The couple had a son.

Cipriano Segundo Montesino died on 27 August 1901 in Madrid.

== Selected works and publications ==
- Summary of the Course on Machine Construction (1853-54), 4 vols. (Madrid), 1853–1854.
- Translation and notes of Principles of Political Economy by J.R. McCulloch. Madrid, Imprenta de M. Sanz y Gómez, 1855.
- Report on the State of Public Works in Spain in 1856: presented to the Excellency the Minister of Development by the General Directorate of Public Works, Madrid, 1856.
- Breaking the Isthmus of Suez: A Report on the Union of the Red Sea to the Mediterranean Sea Through a Maritime Canal, presented to His Majesty's Government, Madrid, 1857.
- Suez Isthmus Canal. Letter from Cipriano Segundo Montesino, in Public Works Review, Vol. 6 (1858), pp. 249–250.
- Speech by His Excellency Mr. Cipriano Segundo Montesino, in speeches read before the Royal Academy of Sciences at the public reception of Mr. Lucio del Valle, Madrid, Imprenta de José C. de la Peña, 1861.
- Report Presented by Mr. Cipriano Segundo Montesino as a Member of the Commission for the Study of the International Exhibition of London 1862 - Class V. Railway Materials, Madrid, 1863.
- Letter to His Excellency the Minister of Development on the Layout of the Direct Railway from Madrid to Lisbon between Malpartida de Plasencia and Abrantes, Madrid, 1874.
- Speech by His Excellency Mr. Cipriano Segundo Montesino, in speeches read before the Royal Academy of Exact, Physical, and Natural Sciences at the public reception of His Excellency Mr. Práxedes Mateo Sagasta on June 20, 1897, Madrid, Imprenta de L. Aguado, 1897, pp. 33–65.
