= Société d'Études du Canal de Suez =

The Société d'études du Canal de Suez (more correctly the Société d'études de l'Isthme de Suez) was a society set up in 1846 by the Saint-Simonist Prosper Enfantin in Paris to study the Isthmus of Suez and the possibility of a Suez Canal.

== Preliminary history ==
In the 1820s, the Saint-Simonists got caught by the idea of creating a canal between the Mediterranean and the Red Sea. In 1833, Enfantin and some of his followers travelled to Egypt hoping, amongst other matters, to further this idea. He did not succeed in getting the Khedive Muhammad Ali Pasha to be interested, but was able to discuss his ideas with the French consul de Lesseps, with Linant de Bellefonds, a high ranking engineer in the Egyptian public works administration, and with lieutenant Waghorn, the developer of the Overland Route. He returned to Paris in 1836 after some of his followers working on the Delta Barrage had died from plague. Although disappointed by the result of that journey, Enfantin kept the idea alive over the following ten years.

== The Society ==
Members of the society set up by Enfantin in 1846 were the French Enfantin, Arlès-Dufour, Jules, Lon and Paulin Talabot, the British Robert Stephenson and Edward Starbuck, the Austrian Alois Negrelli, inspector of the Emperor Ferdinand Northern Railway, and Feronce and Sellier of Leipzig as representatives of the German interest. The office of the Society was located at Enfantin's private house. The Society was not intended to be a purely private matter, but was seen as a semi official commission supported by the Khedive and by Linant-Bey in the public works department.

In September 1847, the Society sent three groups of engineers and surveyors to Egypt. The groups led by Stephenson and Negrelli explored the coastal areas. Paul-Adrien Bourdaloue and his group, commissioned by Talabot, proceeded at the survey and leveling of the Isthmus of Suez. They found that the difference in levels between the Mediterranean and Red Sea was negligible, contrary to the conclusions of Jacques-Marie Le Père, an engineer on Bonaparte's Egyptian Expedition, who had calculated a difference of some 9 m.

Following the revolutions of 1848, the increasing importance of railways, the lack of interest of the British members and the death of Muhammad Ali Pasha, the society was limited in its influence and activity in Egypt. The former viceroy of the Ottoman Empire in Egypt, Muhammad Ali, died in 1848, and his position went to his grandson Abbas, who was not open to foreign influence. It was not until Abbas' assassination in 1854 and control passed to his uncle, Sa'id, that interest again was spurred in a canal, this time under the sole influence of Ferdinand de Lesseps - who corresponded at least once with the Société and gained details about a canal plan in the intervening period, and, who had also acted as a mentor of Sa'id when Sa'id was a young man.
