= Michel Ange Lancret =

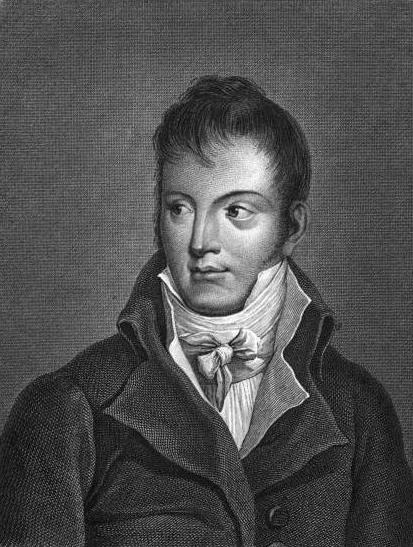
Michel Ange Lancret.

Michel Ange Lancret (December 15, 1774 – December 17, 1807), was an engineer with the French Corps of Bridges and Roads.

He was a student of the École Polytechnique in 1794, became an Engineer of Bridges and Roads in 1797, and was a savant who accompanied Napoleon's 1798 campaign in Egypt as a member of the Commission des Sciences et des Arts, a corps of 167 technical experts.

He began describing various monuments on the banks of the Nile and remnants of ancient civilization of the pharaohs. He also wrote the initial report about the Rosetta Stone that was published on behalf of Napoleon's newly founded scientific association in Cairo, the Institut d'Égypte. In the report he noted that it contained three inscriptions, the first in hieroglyphs and the third in Greek, and rightly suggesting that the stone offered three versions of the same text. Lancret's report, dated 19 July 1799, was read to a meeting of the Institut soon after 25 July.

On his return to France he was appointed in April 1802 the Commissioner for what would be the Description de l'Égypte, and directed the publication from 1805.
