= Antoine Galland (1763–1851) =

French printer

- Born: 1763
- Died: 1851 (aged 87–88)
- Occupations: Publisher; printer
- Years active: 1670–1715
- Notable work: Tableau de l'Égypte pendant le séjour de l'armée française

Antoine Galland (1763 – 1851) was a publisher and printer during the French Revolution and First Empire. As a printer, he joined the Commission des Sciences et des Arts, a body of technical experts (savants) sent to Egypt in 1798 to aid the work of the French expeditionary force in its successful invasion. He was therefore in Cairo when the newly discovered Rosetta Stone arrived in the city. With two other experts (Jean-Joseph Marcel and Nicolas-Jacques Conté) he was called on to make lithographic copies from the stone. These copies, the first seen in Europe, were used by Silvestre de Sacy and Johan David Åkerblad in their early attempts to decipher the hieroglyphic and demotic scripts.

On his return to France, Galland in 1802 first published a two-volume memoir of the expedition.

== Works ==
- Tableau de l'Égypte pendant le séjour de l'armée française. Paris: Galland, an XIII [1804]. 2 vols. Text of vol. 1 (Google Books)
