= Louis-Jules Bouchot =

French architect

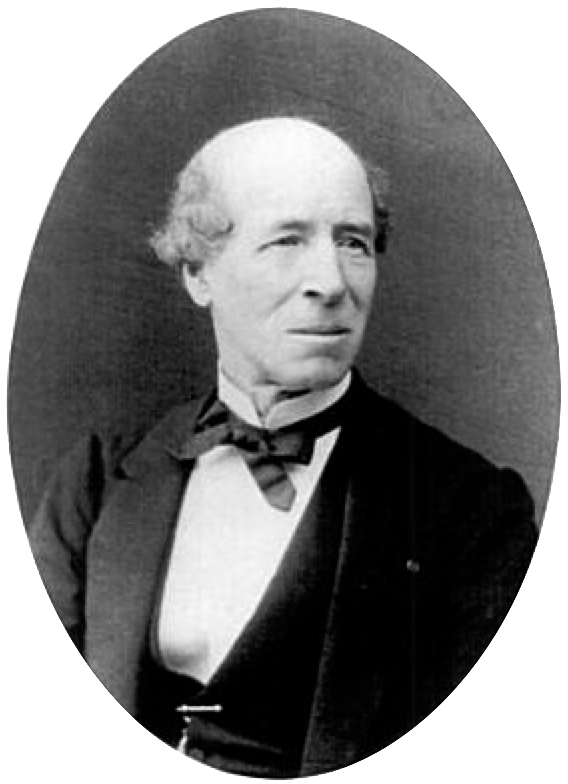
- Bouchot in 1848
- Born: Louis Jules César Bouchot; 12 August 1817; Paris, France
- Died: 15 August 1907 (aged 90); Paris, France
- Education: École Nationale Supérieure des Beaux-Arts
- Occupation: Architect
- Awards: Ordre des Arts et des Lettres

Louis Jules César "Louis-Jules" Bouchot (French pronunciation: [lwi ʒyl buʃo]; 12 August 1817 – 15 August 1907) was a 19th-century French architect responsible in particular for the construction of the Nice and Milan railway stations.

== Biography ==
Louis-Jules Bouchot was born 12 août 1817 at No 47 rue de Seine in Paris, from Félix Bouchot, an employee of the General Post Office administration, and Adélaïde Louise Étienne.

A student of the 1834 class, he studied at the École nationale supérieure des Beaux-Arts in Paris where he was a pupil of his uncle, Alphonse de Gisors.

He alternated work with institutional commissions and private orders.

Chief architect of the Compagnie des chemins de fer de Paris à Lyon et à la Méditerranée (PLM) before becoming the official architect of the French government, he was one of the recipients of the rare album of the PLM railway commissioned in 1859 by James de Rothschild to photographer Édouard Baldus.

Bouchot died 15 August 1907 at his home No 6 rue de l'université in Paris. His funeral was held in the French capital, followed by a religious ceremony at église Saint-Thomas-d'Aquin then the burial at Montparnasse Cemetery.

== Realisations ==
- Palais de justice de Tarbes (1850)
- Château Talabot (Bastide du Roucas-Blanc) Marseille for Paulin Talabot (1860)
- Hôtel des Docks à Marseille (1863). Classified as a Monument historique.
- The old Milan Central railway station (1864), (demolished after 1931)
- Gare de Valence-Ville
- Gare d'Avignon-Centre (1866)
- Gare de Nice-Ville (PLM) (1865–1867)
- Gare de Toulon (Reconstruction after the fire that destroyed the station of architect Laroze)
- Ministère de la Défense at 231 boulevard Saint-Germain in Paris. (1866-1883)
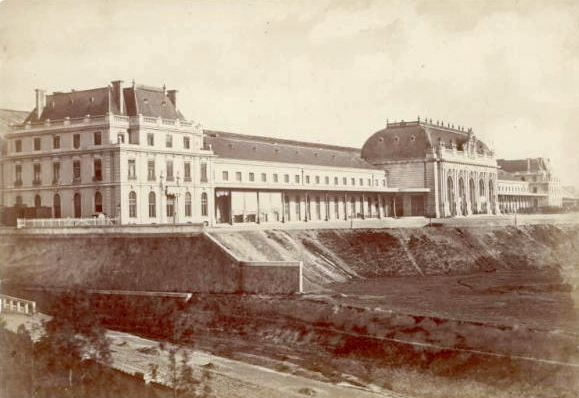
Milan railway station in 1864

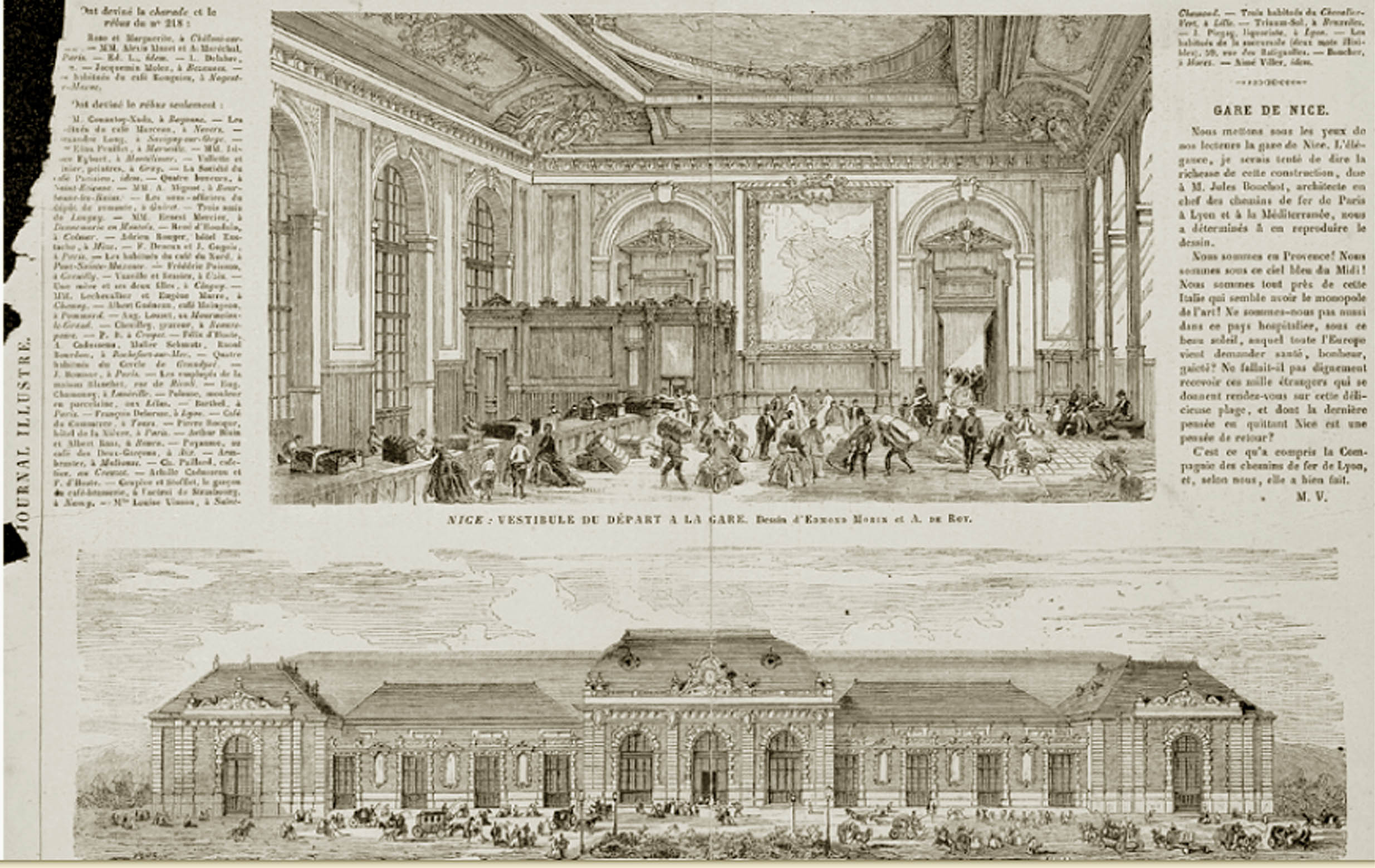
Nice railway station in 1865

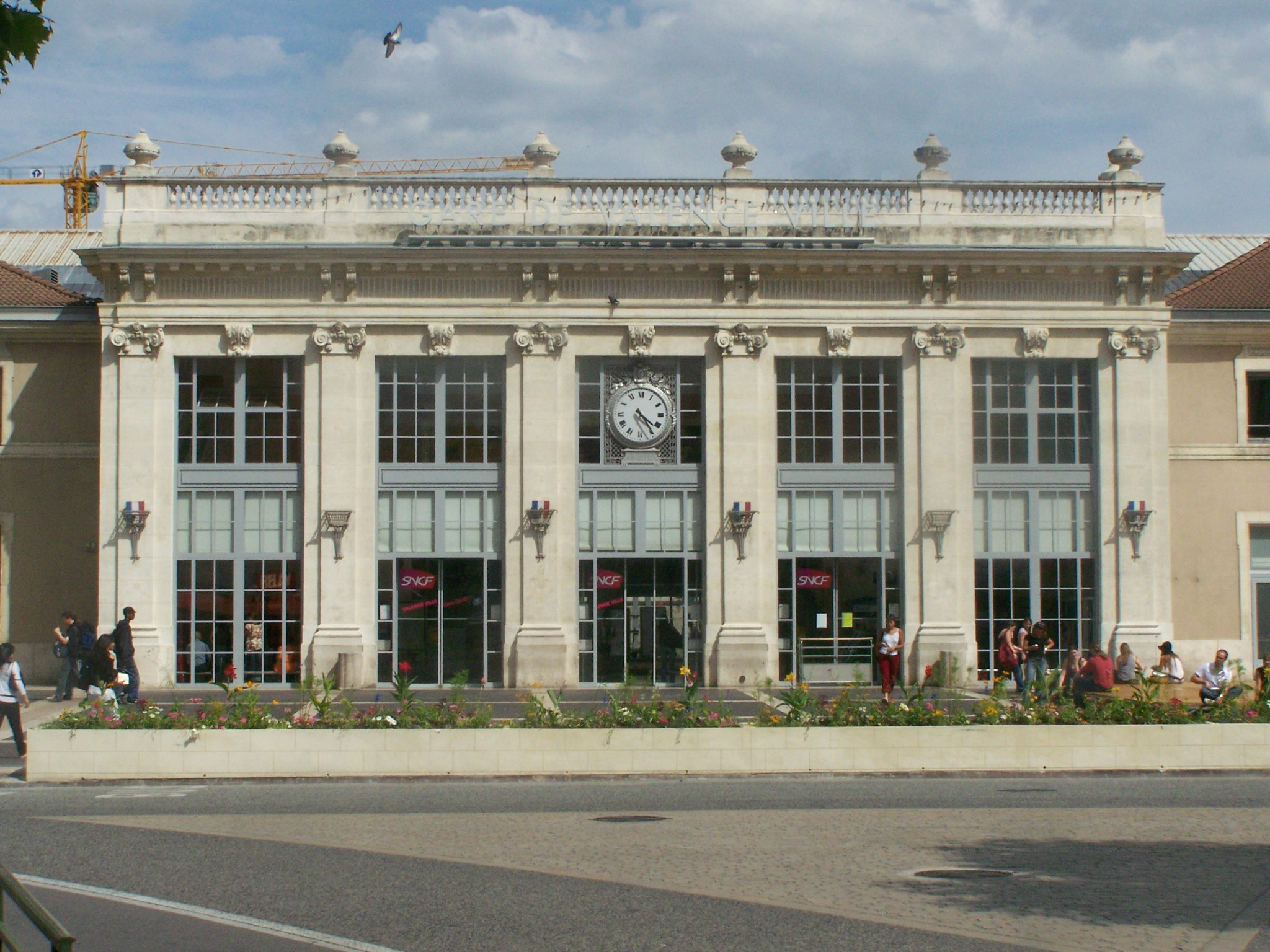
Facade of Valence-Ville railway station.

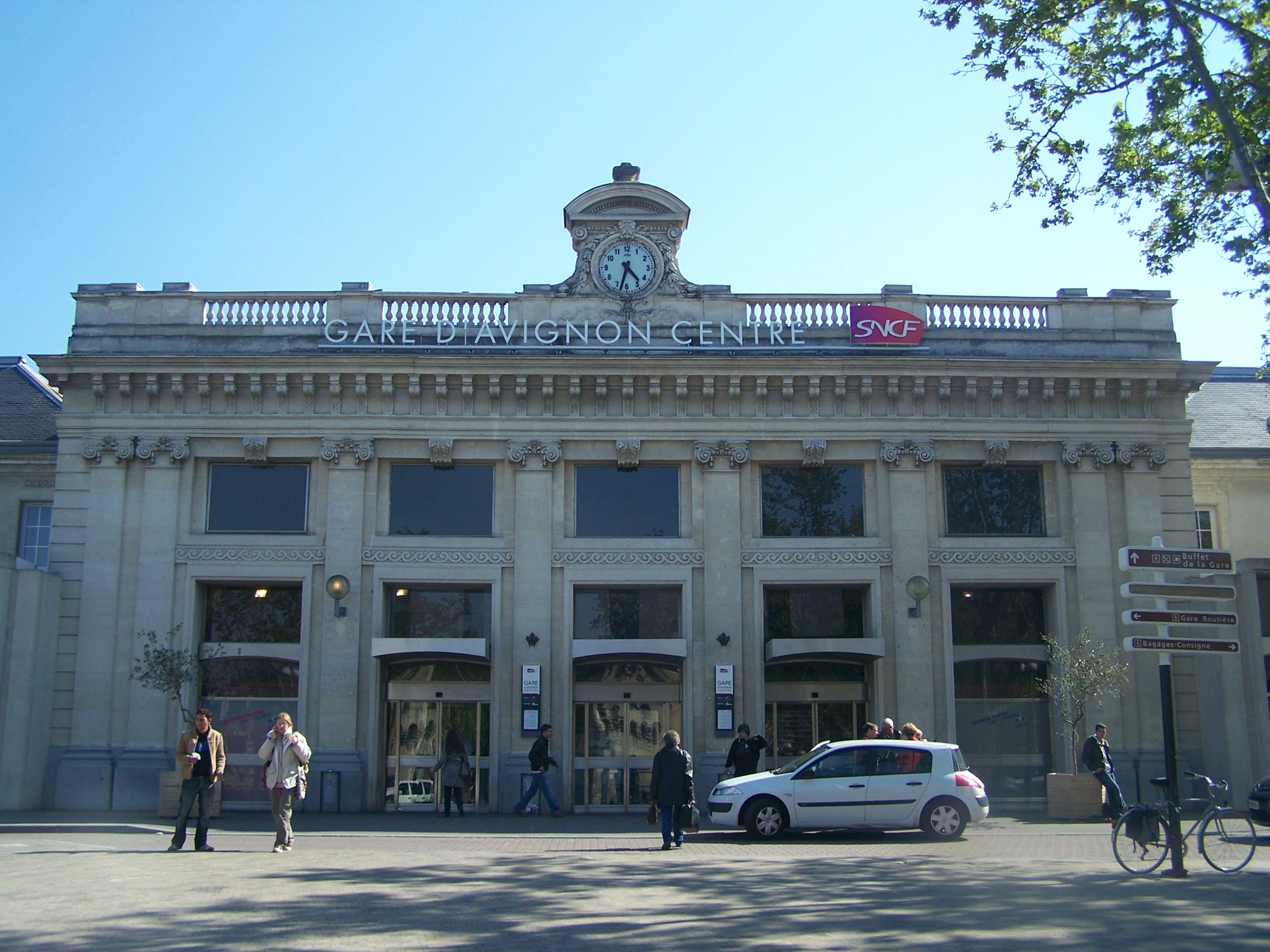
Facade of gare d'Avignon-Centre railway station.

== Distinctions ==
Bouchot was made a chevalier in the Ordre national de la Légion d'honneur 12 August 1860 and was promoted an officer on 5 February 1878.

== Bust of Louis-Jules Bouchot ==
A bust of Louis-Jules Bouchot was cast by Gustave Adolphe Désiré Crauk. The musée des beaux-arts de Valenciennes preserves a plaster copy and the Musée d'Orsay a bronze that belonged to the sculptor's widow before its acquisition in 1928.

== Bibliography ==
- Jean-Claude Daufresne, 7. Louis-Jules Bouchot (1817-1907) : à l'Odéon de 1854 à 1897, in Théâtre de l'Odéon: architecture, décors, musée, Éditions Mardaga, 2004 ISBN 9782870098738, (pp. 78–90)
- François Pourpardin, Les bâtiments voyageurs édifiés le long de la ligne impériale (La Compagnie du PLM : les gares de l'architecte Jules Bouchot), in Revue d’histoire des chemins de fer, No 38, 2008, (pp. 59–71).
- "Jules Louis Bouchot". Base Léonore (in French). Paris: Archives nationales. pp. 1–11. cote LH/307/57, notice L0307057.
