= Pierre-Dominique Martin =

French civil engineer (1771–)

Pierre Jacques Dominique Martin
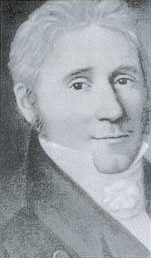
- Born: 11 September 1771; Toulouse
- Died: 11 May 1855 (aged 83); Rions, France
- Citizenship: France
- Education: École des ponts et chaussées

Pierre-Dominique Martin, (September 11, 1771 – May 11, 1855) was a French civil engineer.

== Biography ==
Pierre-Dominique Martin was the son of a Toulouse mirror manufacturer and a mother whose father was a lawyer in the Toulouse parliament. He attended the Toulouse secondary school and attracted the attention of the Archbishop of Toulouse, Loménie de Brienne, who interested the Duke of Chartres in his future. The latter had demanded that his prospective secretary learn drawing, mathematics, and English. He studied with Delaitre, editor of a Dictionary of Engineering Science, to follow the curriculum established by the Duke of Chartres. He then entered the École du génie des États du Languedoc in Toulouse in October 1788, then the École des ponts et chaussées

His parents died and he decided to leave for Paris on December 2, 1790, where he arrived on December 28. He then stayed with Teissier, a Parisian road engineer, whom he had met in Toulouse. In April 1791, he attended Mirabeau's burial at the Panthéon. He worked for the architect Bernard Poyet and at the same time attended the courses of Mauduit and Cousin at the Collège de France and of the architect Julien-David Le Roy. In 1790, the Constituent Assembly debated the reform of the bridges and roads department proposed by Perronet. The law was passed on January 16, 1791. The law provided that the École des Ponts et Chaussées could accept engineers from foreign countries, but nothing was planned for students from provincial engineering schools. He then sent a petition to the Constituent Assembly to integrate these students into the École des Ponts et Chaussées. In his report of May 4, 1792, the deputy Jean Moreau declared that it was not possible to admit all the students of the schools of bridges and roads of Brittany and Languedoc because their number was higher than those of the School of Paris. He proposed to reduce the number of admitted to four for Brittany and six for Toulouse, but finally this limitation was not necessary because only three students presented themselves for Brittany, and only two for Toulouse, Martin and his friend Mercadier. A new law was passed on July 1, 1792. Martin being well-versed in mathematics, he was responsible for the mutual teaching of mathematics when he entered the School of Bridges and Roads, in 1792. After the declaration of the homeland in danger with the law of July 10, 1792, he participated with other engineers of the School of Bridges and Roads in the execution of the works of the camp of Paris intended to ensure the defense of the city. Martin was in charge of the construction of a redoubt, near Pantin. He witnessed the insurrection of 10 August 1792 which he recounts in his memoirs. After the dissolution of the camp of Paris, following the victories of Valmy and Jemmapes, Martin returned to school. He received a brevet of captain of the 1st class with orders to go to Toulouse for fear of a war with Spain but he returned this brevet.

In 1793, the levée en masse was organized in Paris. Martin appeared before the National Convention to "have the engineers excluded from the levée en masse." He married on November 25, 1793, Françoise Marie Bron (1771–1854), daughter of Pierre Bron (†1809), who was a colonel of engineers, and Anne-Marie Perrinet de Ferrières (1748–1801), who ran a lottery office and a gambling club in Paris during the Revolution. His friend Jean-François Mercadier (1771–1854) married his sister, Émilie Marie Aimée Bron, on the same day. At the end of 1793, thanks to their stepmother's connections with Gabriel Le Camus, Martin and Mercadier obtained a patent as civil engineers. The Administration sent him to Amiens, but as he did not like it there, he decided to flee. He was transferred to Soissons, where he worked under the orders of Chief Engineer Becquey. He met Bonaparte in the year III at the home of Deputy Goupilleau. He was chosen to be part of the Egyptian Campaign. Coming from Rosetta, he arrived in Cairo on September 22, 1798. He was accused by Menou of embezzlement and from then on, he harbored a deadly hatred for him. On December 17, 1799, he embarked from Alexandria on the America bound for France, but the ship was intercepted by the English, and he was taken prisoner. On January 1, 1800, the commander of the Thésée, who was holding him prisoner on board, freed him. On July 14, 1800, he arrived in Beni-Souef for a long mission in the Fayoum, which lasted until February 1801. Returning to France, he was appointed engineer in Pontoise. He incurred the wrath of Count Molé, Director General of Bridges and Roads, who had had trees cut down on the road between Paris and Beauvais. Martin had drawn up a report and dragged him before the prefectural council. Count Molé never forgave him. He was then sent to Arras and built bridges over the Scarpe and established a plan to regulate the Canche. He was appointed engineer in the Gironde department, where he completed work on the main road to Spain. Seeing no promotion to a higher rank in the Corps of Bridges and Roads, he resigned in 1830. He built the Langon suspension bridge, made of iron chains, 200 meters long, over the Garonne. Construction was authorized by the decree published in the Bulletin des lois on October 19, 1828. It was completed in 1831 at a total cost of 60,000 francs. He retired as a bridges and roads engineer in 1830. From 1830 to 1848, he was mayor of Rions (Gironde).

== Family ==
- Pierre Jacques Dominique Martin, or Pierre-Dominique Martin, married in first marriage, in 1793, with Françoise Marie Bron, divorced on June 27, 1815.

== Distinction ==
- Order of the Legion of Honour, in March 1855

== Publications ==
- Histoire de l'expédition française en Égypte, Paris, J. M. Eberhardt, 1815, 2 vol. tome 1, tome 2.
- Pierre-Dominique Martin (2008). Pierre-Dominique Martin, ingénieur des Ponts et Chaussées, compagnon de Bonaparte en Égypte, autobiographie 1771-1839 [Pierre-Dominique Martin, engineer of Bridges and Roads, compagnon of Bonaparte in Egypt] (in French). preface by Jean Tulard presented and annotated by Yves Laissus. Guénégaud. p. 127..

== See also ==
- Commission des Sciences et des Arts

== Bibliography ==
- Article includes content from the equivalent article in French Wikipedia
