= François-Auguste Parseval-Grandmaison =

French poet

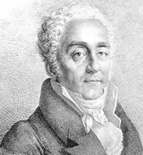
François-Auguste Parseval-Grandmaison

François-Auguste Parseval-Grandmaison (French pronunciation: [fʁɑ̃swa oɡyst paʁsəval ɡʁɑ̃mɛzɔ̃]; 7 May 1759, Paris – 7 December 1834) was a French poet.

He initially intended to painting, he studied with the painter Jacques-Louis David. Ruined by the French Revolution, he managed to make a living as a portrait painter during the revolution.

Having rallied to Napoleon, in whose honor he wrote several poems, he was appointed member of the Science and Arts Commission accompanying Bonaparte during the Egyptian campaign in 1798.

He was the eleventh occupant of the French Academy seat 1 in 1811.

He is buried in Pere-Lachaise Cemetery in Paris.

== Works ==
- Various poems composed in Egypt, England and France (1803)
- Loves epic poem in six cantos, containing the translated episodes of love composed by the best epic poets (1804)
- Guarantee (1804)
- The Birth of the King of Rome (1811)
- Napoleon's Wedding (1819)
- Philip Augustus, a heroic poem in twelve songs (1825)
