= Charles-Louis Balzac =

French architect and architectural draughtsman

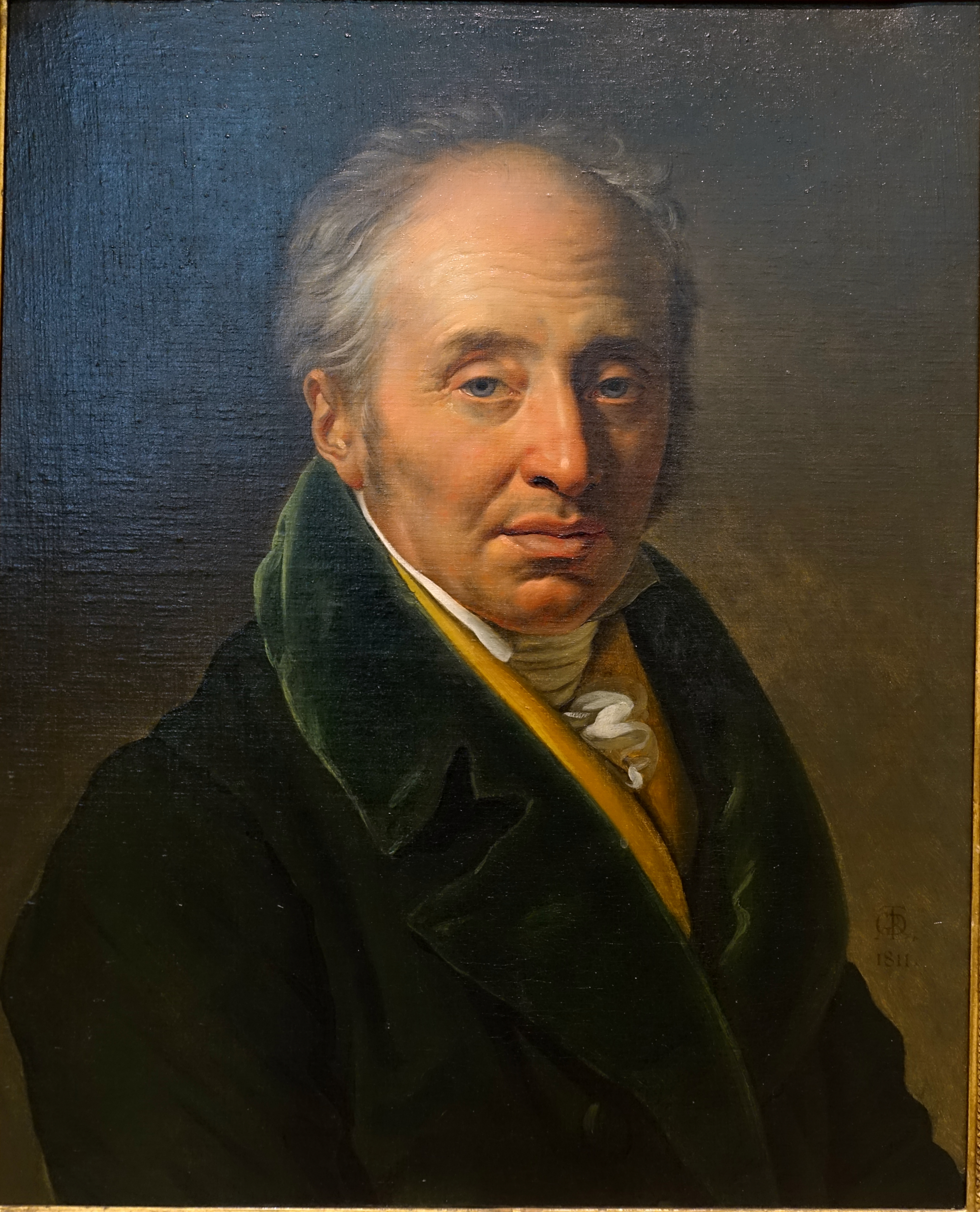
Charles-Louis Balzac, 1811, on display at the Dallas Museum of Art

Charles-Louis Balzac (1752–1820) was a French architect and architectural draughtsman.

== Life ==
Balzac was born in Paris in 1752. He made many drawings for Denon's work on the monuments of Egypt, and also views of various interesting Egyptian buildings, such as the interior of the Mosque at Hassan, the Palace of Karnac, the Great Sphinx, and the Pyramids of Ghizeh. He died in Paris in 1820.
