= Suez Group (political faction) =

1953–54 group of Conservative MPs

The Suez Group was a predominantly right-wing backbench group of Conservative Members of the British Parliament that coalesced in 1953–54 around opposition to the evacuation of British forces from the Suez Canal base in Egypt. Leading figures included Julian Amery, Captain Charles Waterhouse and Billy McLean, with Angus Maude and Viscount Hinchingbrooke also being associated with those who refused the Conservative Whip over Suez.

The group was formed by opponents of Anglo-Egyptian negotiations under Prime Minister Winston Churchill and his Foreign Secretary Anthony Eden, whom had in a 1954 agreement consented to a British withdrawal from the Canal Zone. Conservative backbench dismay had grown for several years prior after a number of imperial retreats in the Middle East, including the collapse of Palestine in 1947–48 and the Abadan Crisis in 1951, while Major Henry Legge-Bourke later told the House of Commons that the “seed” of the group had been sown in late 1952 and that, during the winter recess of 1952–53, a meeting at the residence of former cabinet minister Leo Amery, father of Julian Amery, whose house became the gathering “from which was born the Suez Group”.

== Origins and membership ==
The first public statement of the tendency that became the Suez Group came in the Commons on 17 December 1953, when Waterhouse moved a motion urging the government to suspend negotiations on revising the 1936 Anglo-Egyptian treaty and to retain “sufficient armed forces” in the Canal Zone. Waterhouse framed withdrawal as another stage in imperial retreat; the motion itself crystallised a recognisable Conservative backbench opposition to Eden's Egyptian policy before the 1954 agreement was signed.

The Suez Group's casus belli was found in the Sudan settlement, in which the United Kingdom and Egypt agreed to bring an end to the condominium which had existed in the Sudan since 1899, and subsequent Suez negotiations, both of which hardened the caucus's determination to resist what it called Eden's appeasement of Cairo, and that during the next seventeen months it mounted a sustained campaign against withdrawal.

== Political aims and ideology ==
Amery, speaking against the 1954 settlement, argued that evacuation amounted to “virtually unconditional” withdrawal; he treated the Canal and Britain's wider Middle Eastern position as parts of an international and Commonwealth communications system that should not be surrendered to Egyptian nationalism.

The ideological leaning of the group was not entirely cloistered within the Conservative right. Some members stressed great-power strategy and Commonwealth communications; others highlighted the Canal as an international waterway; others, especially in 1956, concentrated on the danger posed by Nasser to the whole Western position in the Middle East. A contemporary critic in The Spectator newspaper conceded that Waterhouse's circle was “right in some of its diagnosis” in seeing the issue as political rather than merely technical, but argued that its “overt bellicosity” damaged Britain diplomatically. The Suez Group was generally seen as not unified on a detailed positive programme beyond firmness, resistance to “appeasement”, and some form of durable international or British-backed control over strategic communications.

== Activities and influence on government policy ==
The group's most visible activities before July 1954 were parliamentary. It sponsored motions, intervened in foreign affairs debates, and used speeches to make Egypt a test case of post-war British decline. The 17 December 1953 motion was the clearest early attempt to force a harder line, and the 29 July 1954 Commons debate on the Anglo-Egyptian agreement became the decisive public confrontation: Waterhouse opposed the agreement from the Conservative benches, and Amery denounced it as capitulation. Churchill nevertheless carried the House and the agreement survived. Onslow's broader assessment is that, among the backbench rebellions faced by Churchill's post-1951 government, the Suez Group was the most serious. Her explanation is not that it won in 1954, because it did not, but that it created a durable organised pressure point on the government's Egyptian policy.

In July 1956, after Nasser nationalised the Suez Canal company, Amery immediately assured Eden in the Commons that he would have overwhelming public support for whatever steps he took. By the autumn the group had become a “serious problem” for Eden, whose vulnerability on Suez was sharpened by the fact that he himself had signed the 1954 withdrawal agreement. And so during the ensuing Suez Crisis, the group contributed materially to the domestic pressure that narrowed Eden's room for manoeuvre by October, rather than dictating policy itself.

== Contemporary reactions and legacy ==
Contemporary reactions to the Suez Group were sharply divided. Admirers treated it as the consistent voice of national resolve, vindicated by events after 1954. Critics regarded it as an anachronistic imperial caucus that misread Britain's post-war constraints. In August 1956 Desmond Donnelly wrote that Waterhouse's group was correct to see Suez as a major political crisis, but wrong in its inability to adapt to the world of the United Nations and “international liberalism”; in his view its inflammatory language itself damaged Britain's diplomatic position. Labour critics went much further after the debacle. In the Commons in May 1957, anti-Suez speakers explicitly claimed that the Suez Group had pushed Eden into the adventure. Members of the group and its orbit responded by rejecting the charge and arguing instead that the real error had been weakness and retreat, first in 1954 and then again in 1956–57.

The group's afterlife was immediate as well as long-term. In December 1956 Time reported that a committee of Suez-group backbenchers had gone to Eden to warn him against any further softening in the face of United Nations pressure. In January 1957 the same magazine reported that thirty Suez-group backbenchers had gathered privately and signalled that they would not serve under R. A. Butler, indicating that the caucus still mattered in the politics of succession after Eden's collapse. The legacy, therefore, was not merely retrospective. In the short term, the group became part of the story of Eden's fall and of the reshaping of the Conservative right in the early decolonisation era.
