= Alois Negrelli =

Tyrolean civil engineer and railroad pioneer

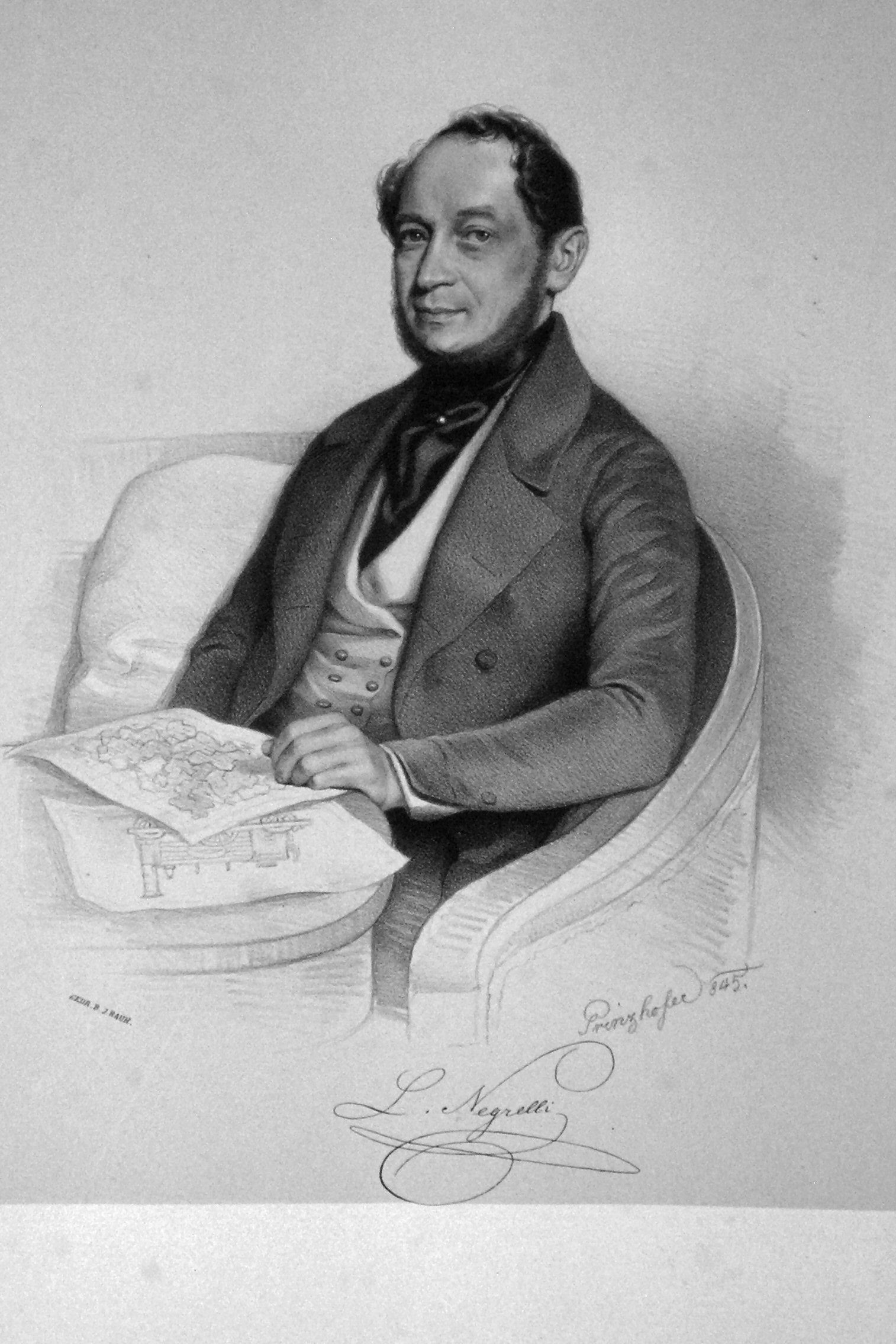
- Born: 23 January 1799; Fiera di Primiero
- Died: 1 October 1858 (aged 59); Vienna
- Occupation: Engineer
- Known for: Various railroads, Société d'Études du Canal de Suez, International Commission for the piercing of the isthmus of Suez
- Works: Negrelli Viaduct
- Awards: Austrian title of Ritter von Moldelbe

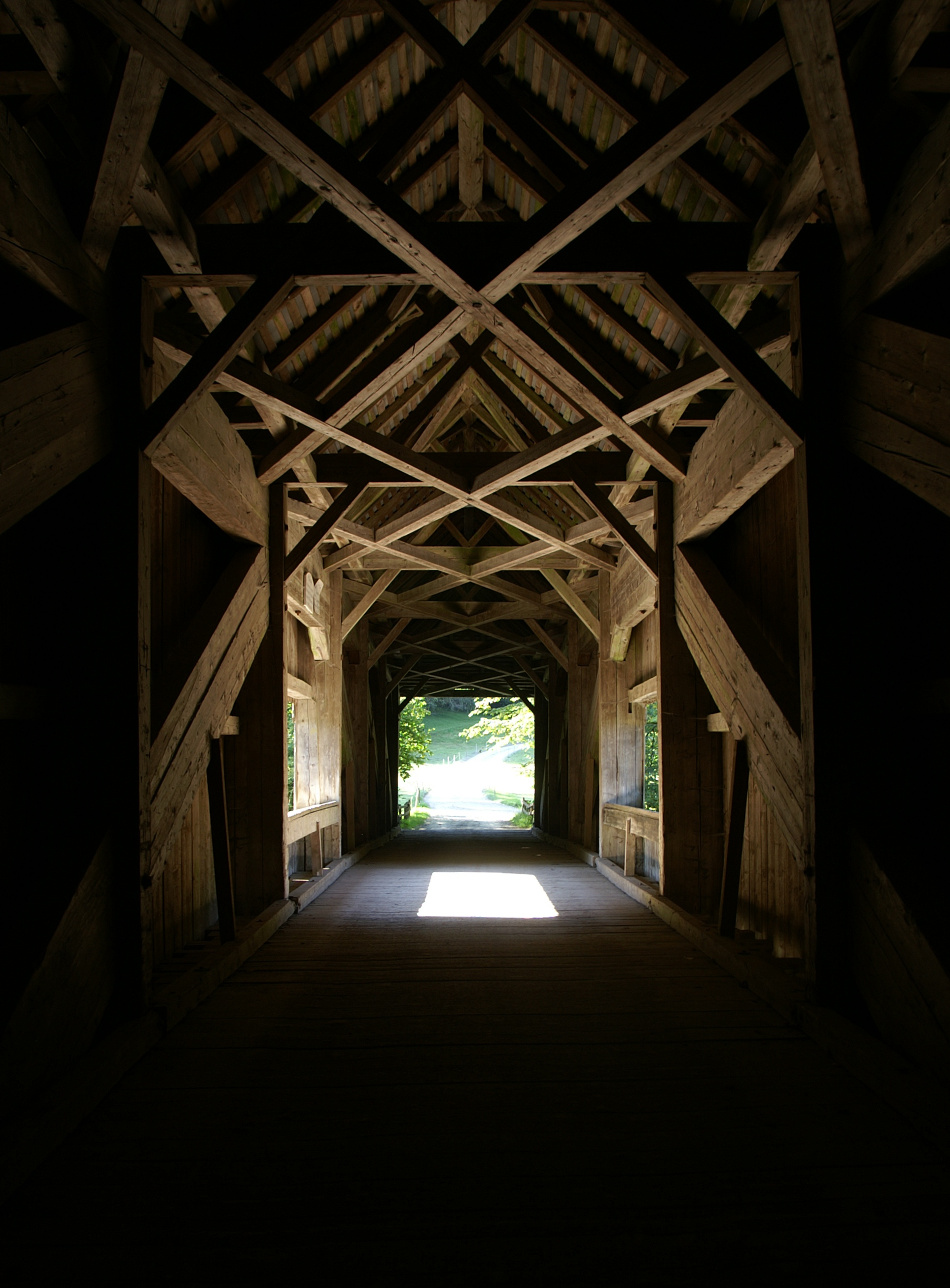
Gschwendtobel-Bridge, Lingenau, 1830

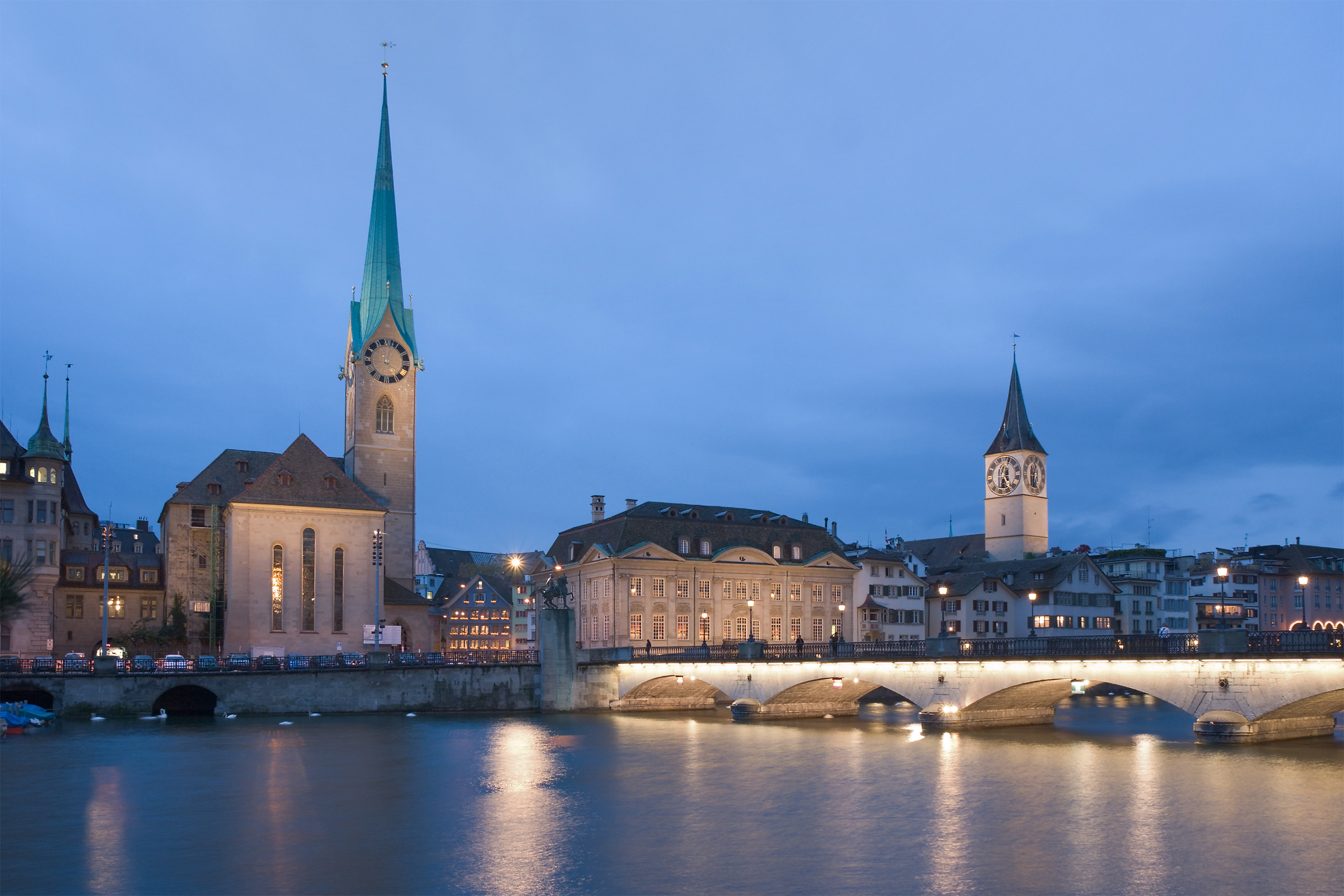
Münster-Bridge in Zürich, 1838

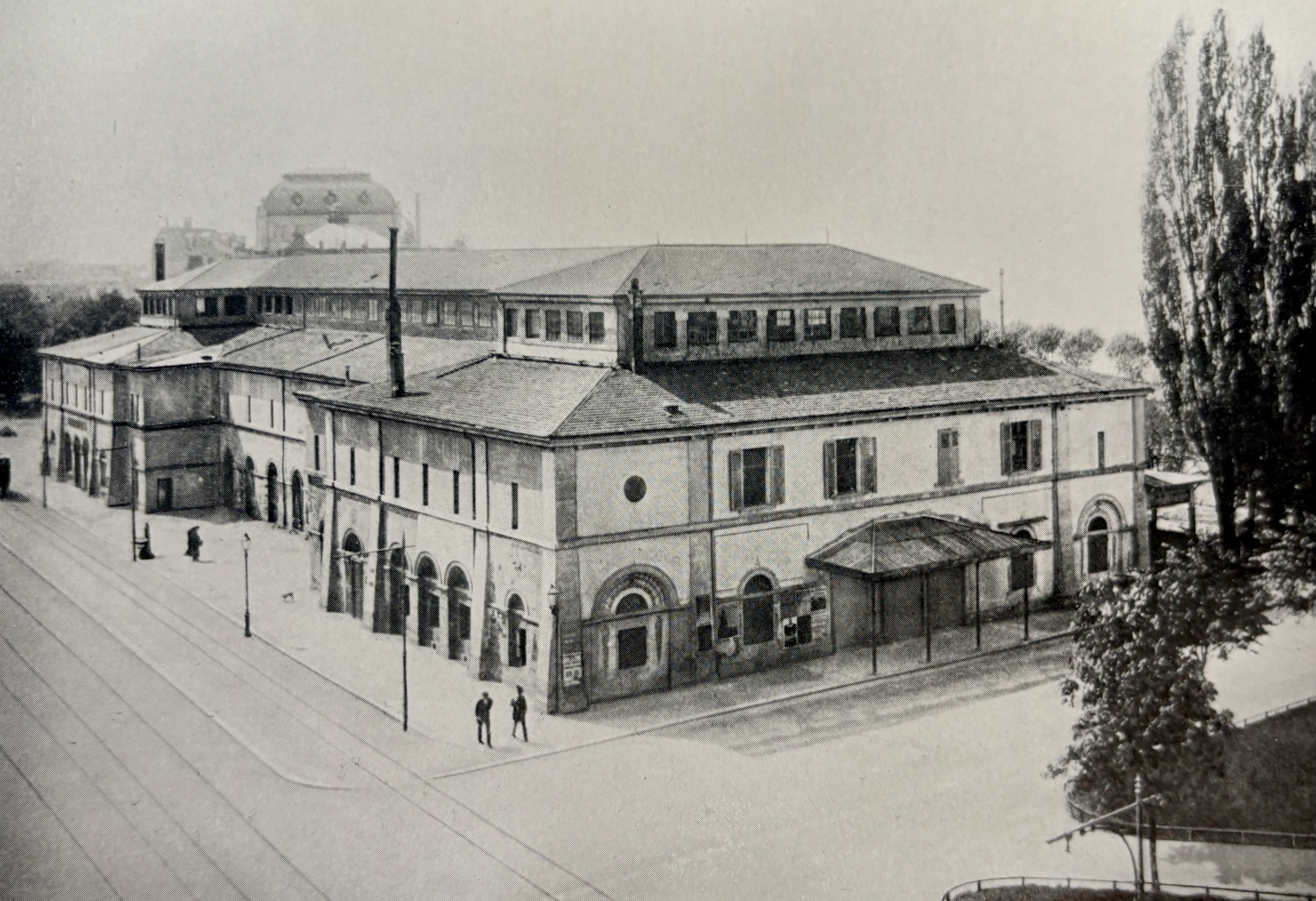
Kornhaus (granary) and concert hall, Zürich 1839, demolished in 1896

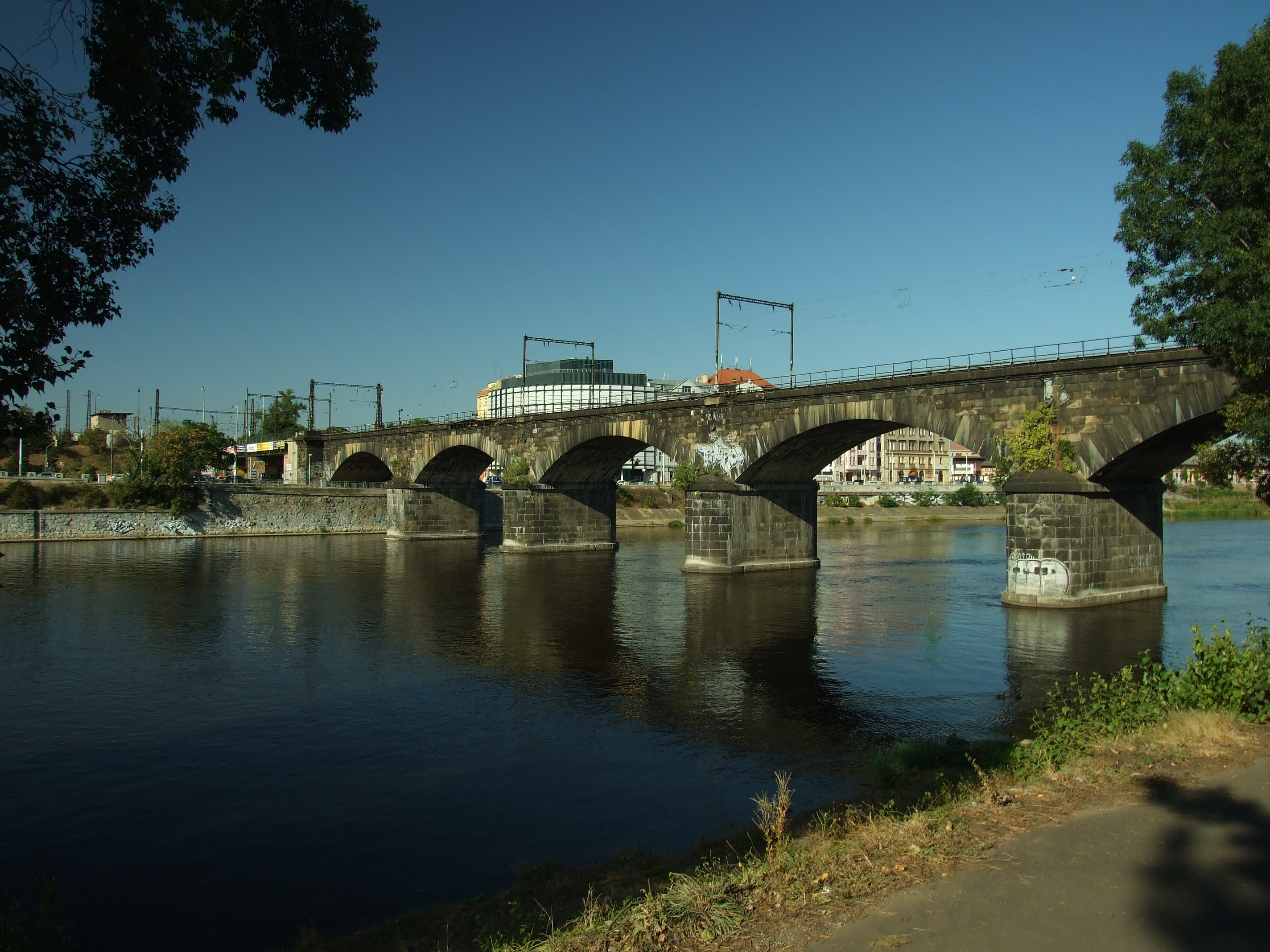
The Negrelli Viaduct in Prague, 1849

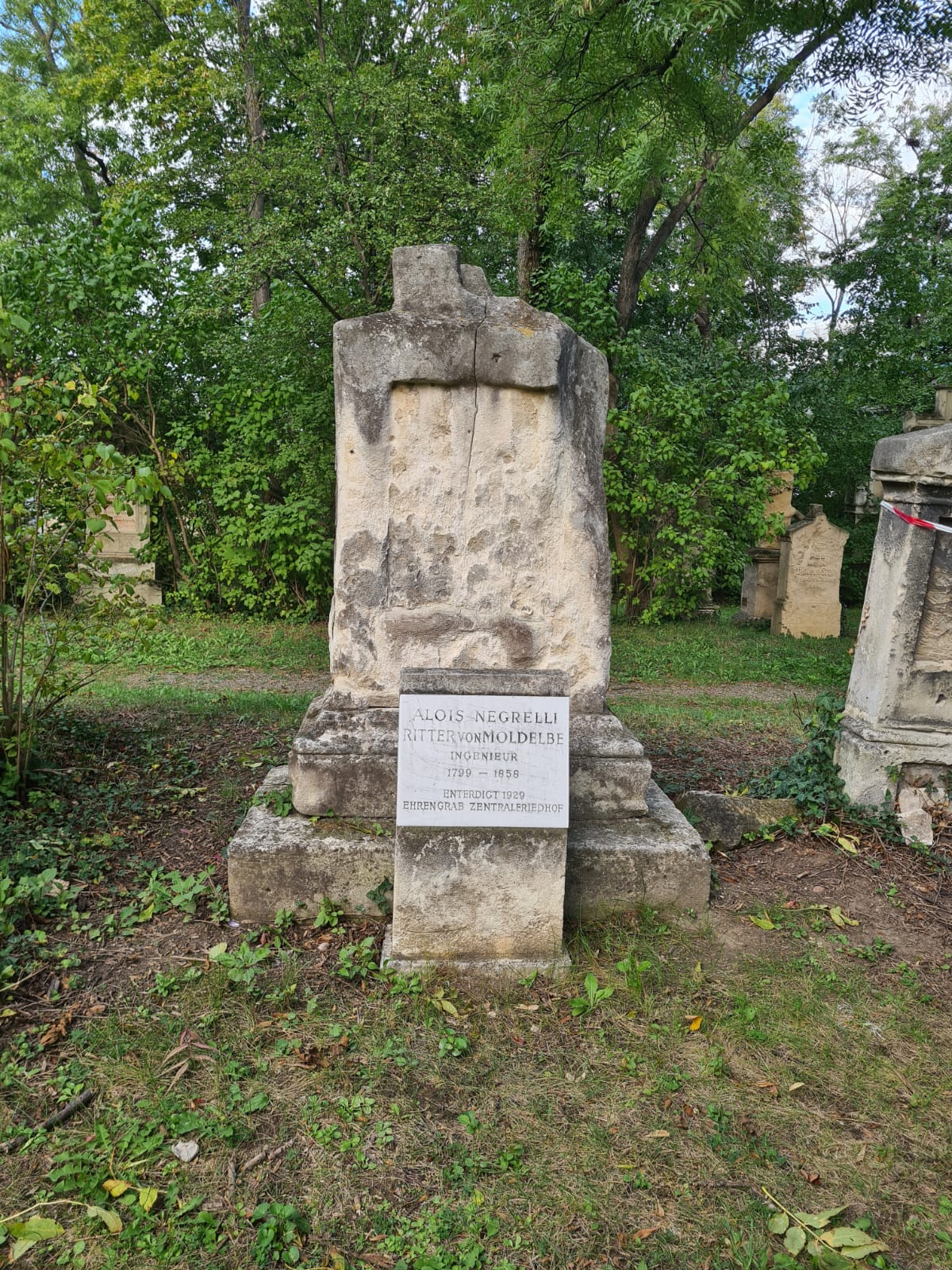
Grave monument of Alois Negrelli at the St. Marx Cemetery

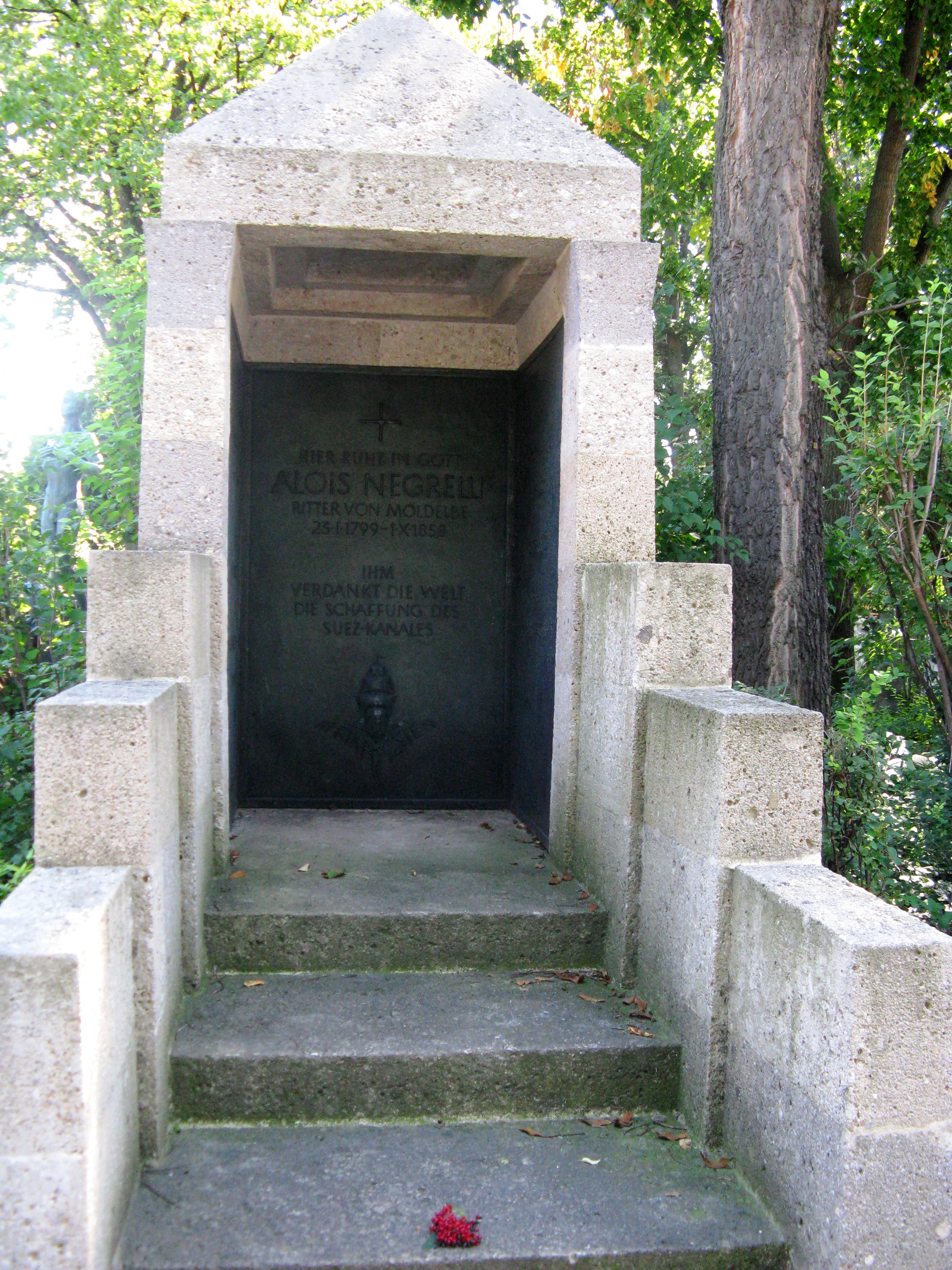
Tomb of Alois Negrelli at the Vienna Central Cemetery

Nikolaus Alois Maria Vinzenz Negrelli, Ritter von Moldelbe (born Luigi Negrelli; 23 January 1799 – 1 October 1858) was a Tyrolean civil engineer and railroad pioneer mostly active in parts of the Austrian Empire, Switzerland, Germany and Italy.

== Biography ==
Alois Negrelli was born Luigi Negrelli as the seventh of ten children to an Italian-speaking father and a German-speaking mother in Fiera di Primiero (German Markt Primör) in the Dolomites. The village is situated in the Trentino (Trient), once the south of the County of Tyrol (then with the Austrian Empire, today in northern Italy). Being in part of Welschtyrolean heritage (Romance-speaking southern Tyroleans), the father and one of his older sisters actively supported the Tyrolean Rebellion of 1809, led by Andreas Hofer against the occupation of their homeland by French and Bavarian troops. Alois's father was held prisoner for years, finally returning home in 1814. The family, having lost a substantial part of their wealth, struggled at first to enable good education and safe livelihood for Alois and his siblings. This toil was facilitated by governmental authorities in recognition of their commitment. Alois Negrelli received an Austrian scholarship and went to secondary school in Feltre in 1812, together with his brothers. He later studied in Padua and Innsbruck in 1817, the capital of the Crownland of Tyrol.

=== Civil engineering ===
After beginning his career in 1818 as assistant to the Department of Construction in Innsbruck, Austria, he also worked in Vorarlberg from 1825 onwards residing in Bregenz. Negrelli constructed the Gschwendtobel-Brücke in Lingenau, a covered wooden bridge still in existence, and earned a reputation for taking part in the channelisation of the Alpenrhein and of the various Austrian and Swiss interests connected therewith. He moved to Switzerland in 1832 and took part in the erection of various constructions in the Canton of St. Gallen. In 1835, Negrelli was called to Zürich, where he continued with similar activity, notably working on the Münsterbrücke (Munster Bridge) crossing the Limmat together with Ferdinand Stadler, who was responsible for the carpentry. Stone bridges were still built over a wooden timber frame at this time. He also created the new Kornhaus (granary) in 1839 which later became the first Tonhalle (concert hall) of Zürich. In 1895 it was replaced by a newly constructed second building for this purpose.

=== Railway construction ===
Beginning in 1836 Negrelli started planning a first railway line in this country. The Swiss Northern Railway was built years later in 1846 from Zürich to Baden, Switzerland, under his supervision. At around this time he was also appointed to different governmental commissions, working for other cantons. During a journey to England, France and Belgium he, like many other engineers, studied recent advances in railway construction and subsequently published his ideas of adapting this technology to mountainous regions in papers, receiving wide attention in the industry. In 1837 he advocated the creation of the railway Innsbruck–Kufstein in Tyrol and made preliminary plans for it, upon which the project was later based.

Negrelli returned to working in Austria in 1840. He was chosen as inspector general for the private Emperor Ferdinand Northern Railway, and the Northern State Railway in 1842. He was responsible for the construction of the railway lines from Vienna via Prague to the German border in direction of Dresden, and via Ostrava to the Polish border in direction of Kraków. Negrelli prepared the railway to the then Austrian Lviv and the extension to the Russian border further east. He led the construction of the Negrelli Viaduct between 1846 and 1849, a railway bridge crossing the Vltava (Moldau) river in Prague, with 1,110 m the longest bridge of its kind in Europe until 1910 Negrelli's authority in railway matters was of particular relevance in the process of decisions to have the mountainous Semmering railway built by a fellow engineer, Carl von Ghega, in 1848 and his advice was requested for projects by various other states like the Kingdom of Württemberg and the Kingdom of Saxony in Germany. In 1849, Negrelli was to travel to the then Austrian Kingdom of Lombardy–Venetia with the task to oversee work on public buildings, railways and telegraph lines, and heading a commission regulating traffic on the river Po. In 1850 he was awarded for his services and received a title of nobility with the designation Ritter von Moldelbe, chosen by himself in memory of his times working on the rivers Vltava/Moldau and Elbe. After arriving back in Vienna in 1855, Negrelli was appointed inspector general of the newly founded Imperial Royal Privileged Austrian State Railway Company until 1857. It would later become the Staats-Eisenbahn-Gesellschaft (State Railway Company), one of the biggest railway enterprises of the Austrian Empire.

=== Channelisation projects in Egypt ===
Negrelli, like many other engineers of his time, had thought about possibilities to build an artificial waterway to connect the Mediterranean Sea with the Red Sea from 1836 onwards. In 1846 he had been invited by Barthélemy Prosper Enfantin to the Société d'Études du Canal de Suez and took part in the exploration tour to the isthmus of Suez in 1847. Because of the outbreak of revolutions of 1848 and the following years, and other circumstances the Société d'Études had to cease activities, Negrelli himself being sent to Lombardy–Venetia at that time.

In 1855 Negrelli was invited by Ferdinand de Lesseps to participate again, now in the International Commission for the piercing of the isthmus of Suez (Commission Internationale pour le percement de l'isthme de Suez). Consisting of thirteen experts from seven countries who were to examine the plans made by Linant de Bellefonds it had to advise on the feasibility of and on the best route for a canal project. Negrelli formed part of the surveying group travelling to Egypt in late 1855 and early 1856. In the final deliberations of the commission in Paris at the end of June 1856, his principal ideas of a canal without locks and a northern entry further to the west prevailed. A comprehensive final report was produced, including plans and profiles, according to which the Suez Canal was later to be built by the Suez Canal Company, established in late 1858 by Lesseps.

The Suez Canal project, as the first of its kind in modern times, caused headlines. Since the Commission Internationale had presented their report in 1856 critics were agitating against it to a great degree, among them Robert Stephenson, son of railway pioneer George Stephenson. Negrelli and others declared active support. The quarrel between defenders and repudiators went on for a time, this exchange was followed by publications throughout Europe, especially in France, Austria and the United Kingdom. Negrelli was prevented from travelling to Egypt another time and meeting with Lesseps, who went to London, in June 1858. Feeling unwell, he used his leave from work to stay in a health resort for recovery. On the way back, Negrelli was able to attend a congress on railway development held in Trieste before he arrived at home in Vienna. Already seriously ill by September, he managed to write one last reply on the comments of Stephenson. Negrelli's response was published in the Oesterreichische Zeitung (Austrian Gazette) on 26 September 1858.

Alois Negrelli von Moldelbe died in the morning hours of 1 October 1858 at age 59, probably from food poisoning causing bacterial infection. His death occurred only weeks shy of witnessing the establishment of the Suez Canal Company, and just half a year before the works on the canal project were to officially begin. Negrelli was first buried at the St. Marx Cemetery, but later moved to the Vienna Central Cemetery in 1929.

In his book Transportation and Communication of Egypt, Negrelli wrote in 1856 about the Suez Canal:

The connection of the two seas by a maritime canal, shortening the route between Europe and the rich countries of the Old World located at the Indian Ocean, not only for the development of global trade but also for the increase of cabotage (domestical shipping) for Egypt, related to the prosperity of inbound welfare to this country so blessed, is an undeniable necessity.

== Selected works ==
- Gutachten über den Bau einer obenfahrbarn Brücke über die Limmat in Zürich, eines neuen Kornhauses und Hafens, 1834 (German)
- Ausflug nach Frankreich, England und Belgien zur Beobachtung der dortigen Eisenbahnen, mit einem Anhange über Anwendung von Eisenbahnen in Gebirgsländern, L. Negrelli, Oberingenieur der Kaufmannschaft in Zürich, Frauenfeld 1838 (German); digitised at Austrian Literature Online
- Die Eisenbahnen mit Anwendung der gewöhnlichen Dampfwägen als bewegende Kraft über Anhöhen und Wasserscheiden sind ausführbar. Ein auf Erfahrungen begründeter und praktisch dargestellter Vorschlag. Beck'sche Universitäts-Buchhandlung, Vienna 1842 (German); digitised at Heinrich Heine University of Düsseldorf, Digital Library
- Über Gebirgseisenbahnen ("About Railways in mountainous Areas"), Vienna 1842 (German)
- Die Münsterbrücke in Zürich, Vienna 1844 (German)
- Die gegenwärtigen Transport- und Kommunikationsmittel Egyptens, mit Beziehung auf die beantragte Durchstechung der Landenge von Suez ("Means of Transportation and Communication of Egypt"), Alois Negrelli von Moldelbe, Vienna 1856 (German)
