= Gratien Le Père =

French civil engineer

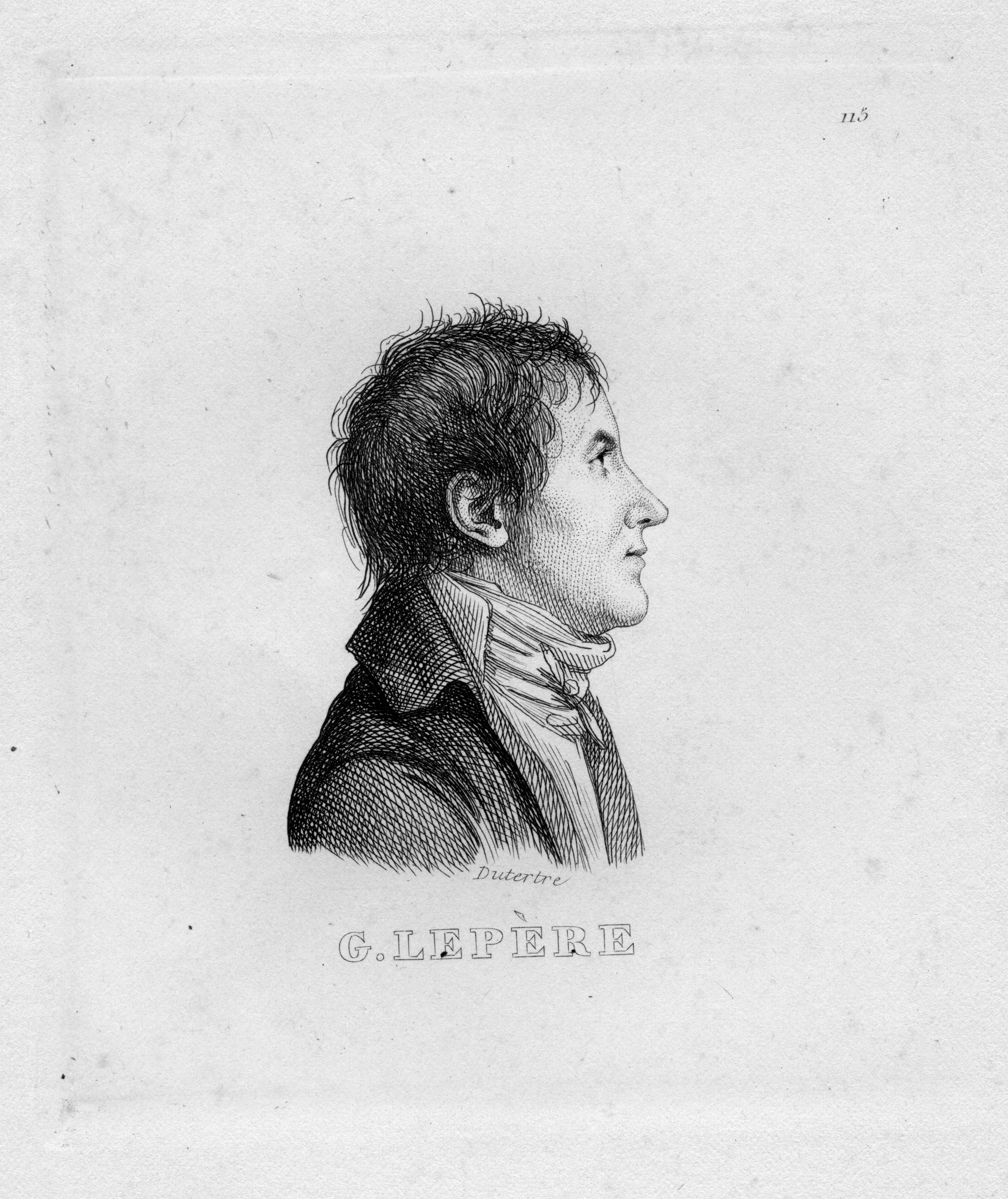
Portrait by André Dutertre

Gratien Le Père (Versailles, 2 June 1769 – Poitiers, 1 August 1826) was a French civil engineer.

A former classmate of Bonaparte at Brienne, he became an engineer of 'Ponts et Chaussées' (bridges and roads). He and his brother Jacques-Marie Le Père both joined the French Campaign in Egypt and Syria and were both leading lights in the programmes aimed at levelling the Suez Isthmus.
