= Paul-Adrien Bourdaloue =

French civil engineer (1798–1868)

- Born: 4 January 1798; Bourges
- Died: 21 June 1868 (aged 70); Bourges, Second French Empire
- Citizenship: France
- Occupations: Engineer, Surveyor
- Known for: Société d'Études du Canal de Suez

Paul Adrien Bourdaloue (4 January 1798, Bourges - 21 June 1868, Bourges) was a French civil engineer and topographer, who proposed the first orthometric levelling of France.

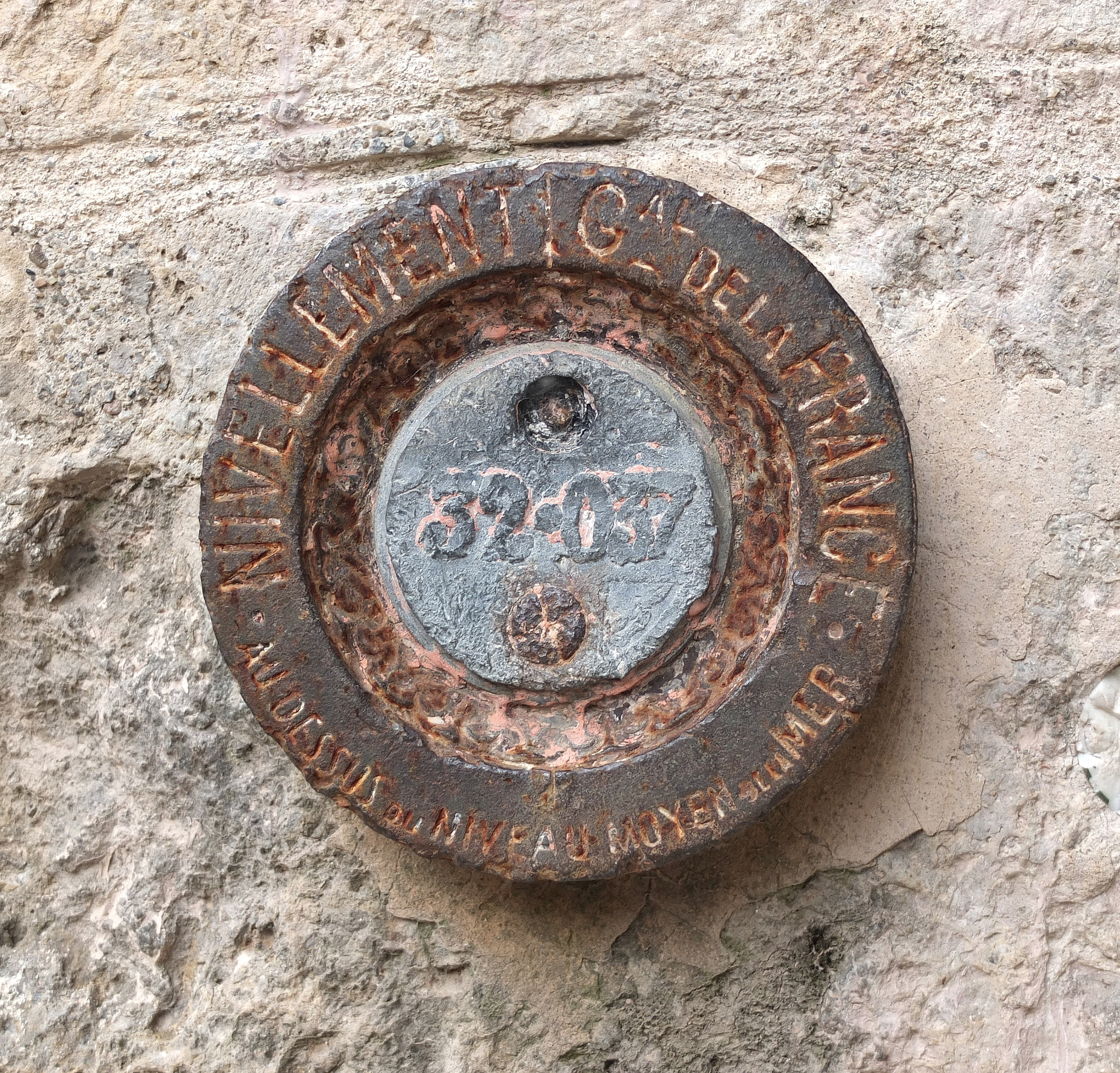
Iron seal at Perpignan Cathedral

== Life ==
Head of the Corps des Ponts et Chaussées, then engineer-resident of the Chemins de fer du Gard, from 1847 he carried out the levelling of the area of the future Suez Canal in Egypt at the request of the engineer Linant de Bellefonds. During this process he and others noted that the difference in levels between the Mediterranean and Red Sea was negligible, contrary to the conclusions of Bonaparte's engineers on the Egyptian Expedition such as Jacques-Marie Le Père.

In 1857, he was commissioned to move onto the general levelling of mainland France. From 1857 to 1863, he laid out a network of 15,000 iron seals across France, providing the country's first level-lines.

He was maire-adjoint of the town of Bourges. In 1865, he entrusted to the architect Albert Tissandier the design of a château d'eau at Séraucourt, still visible. He is buried in the cimetière des Capucins at Bourges.

== Works ==
- Nivellement général de la France (1864, several volumes in-8°), ed. Pigelet, Bourges
