= Negrelli Viaduct =

Bridge in Prague, Czech Republic

Negrelli viaduct
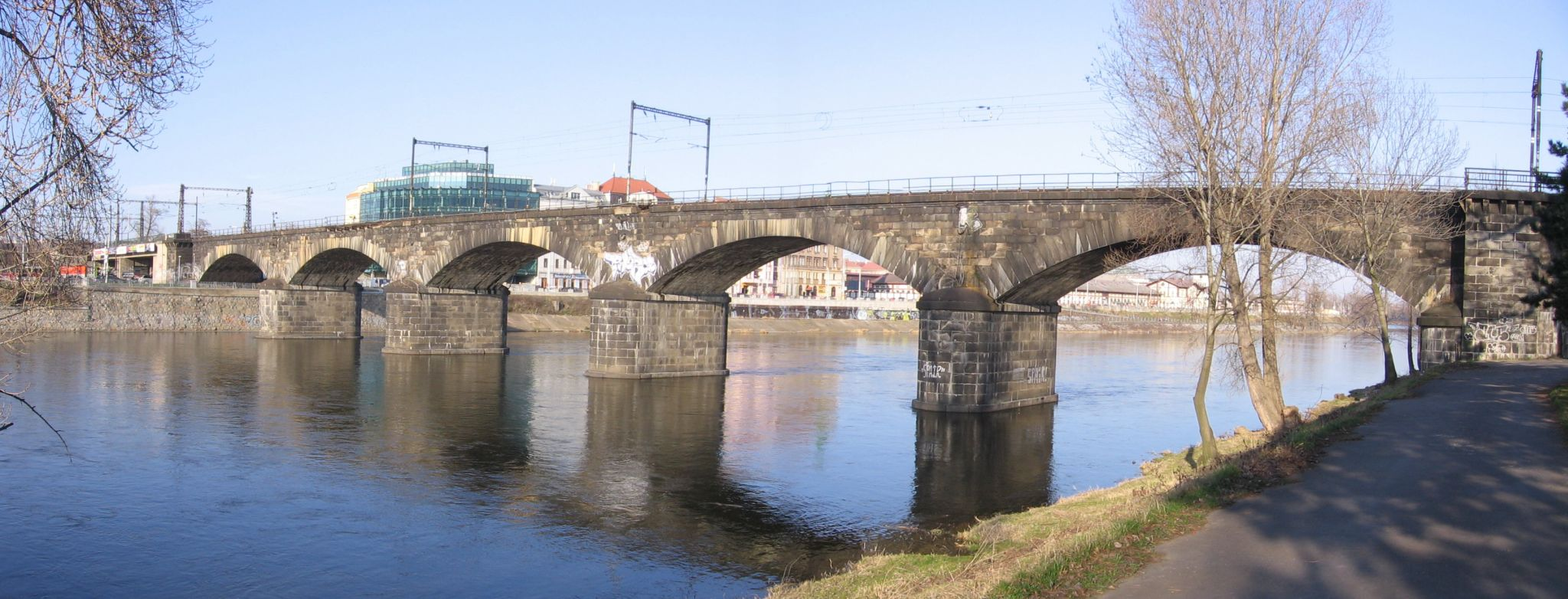
- Viaduct - left branch of the Vltava river
- Coordinates: 50°05′45″N 14°26′28″E
- Crosses: Vltava
- Locale: Prague 6, Prague 7, Prague 8, Bubeneč, Holešovice, Karlín, New Town, Czech Republic
- Official name: Negrelliho viadukt

Characteristics
- Design: 87 pylons
- Total length: 1,100 metres (3,600 ft)

History
- Construction end: 1850

Statistics
- Daily traffic: railway

Location
- Interactive map of Negrelli viaduct

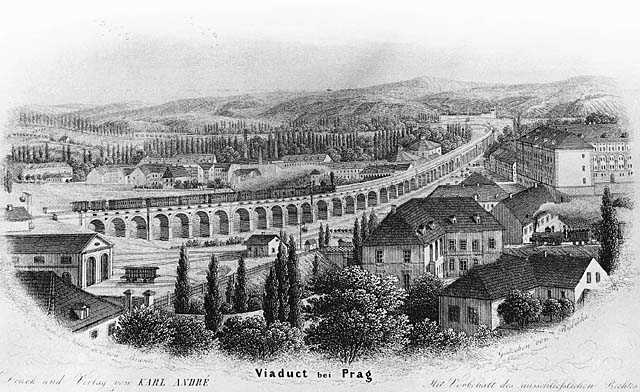
Negrelli viaduct – 19th century

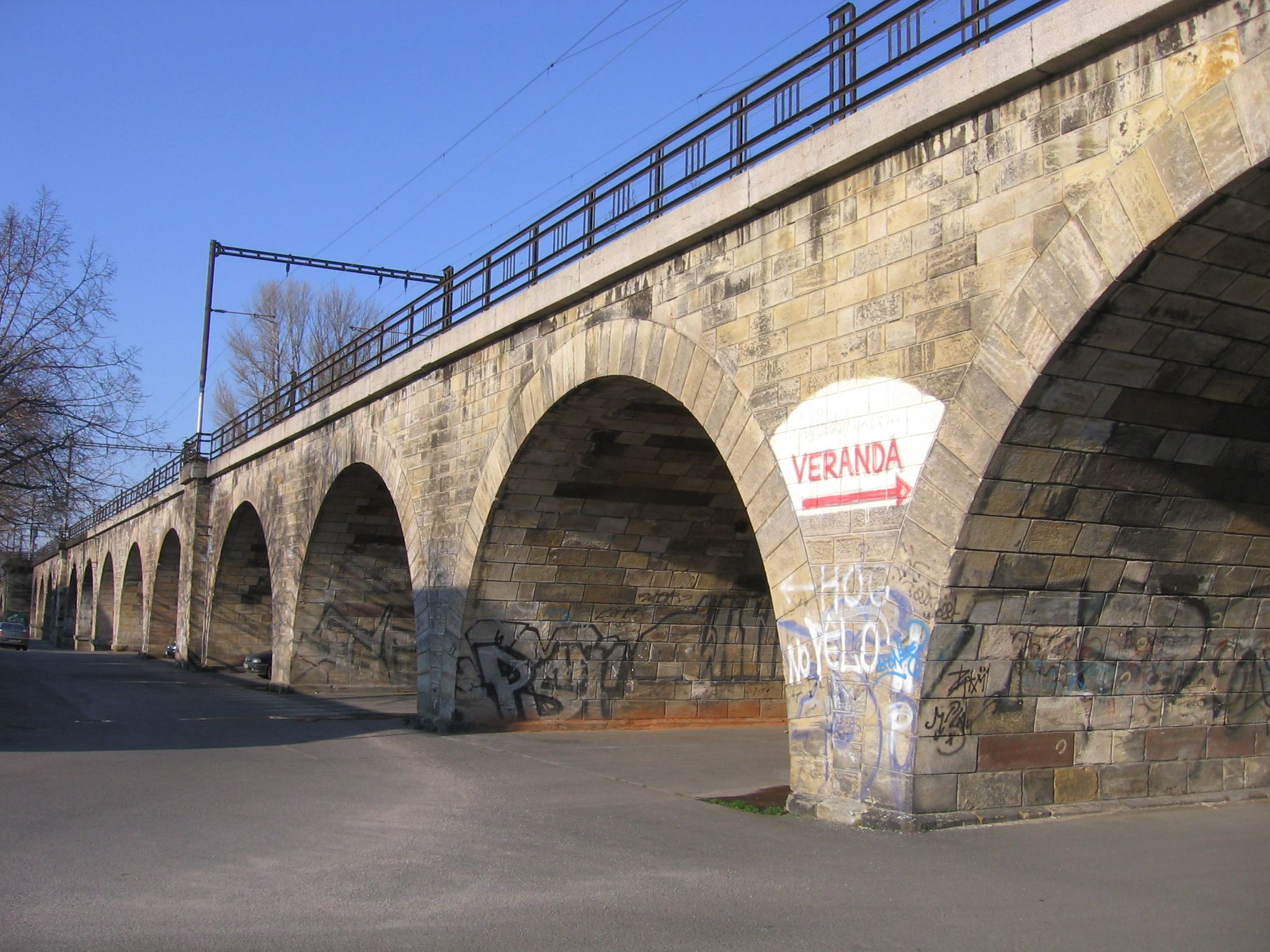
Viaduct – Štvanice island

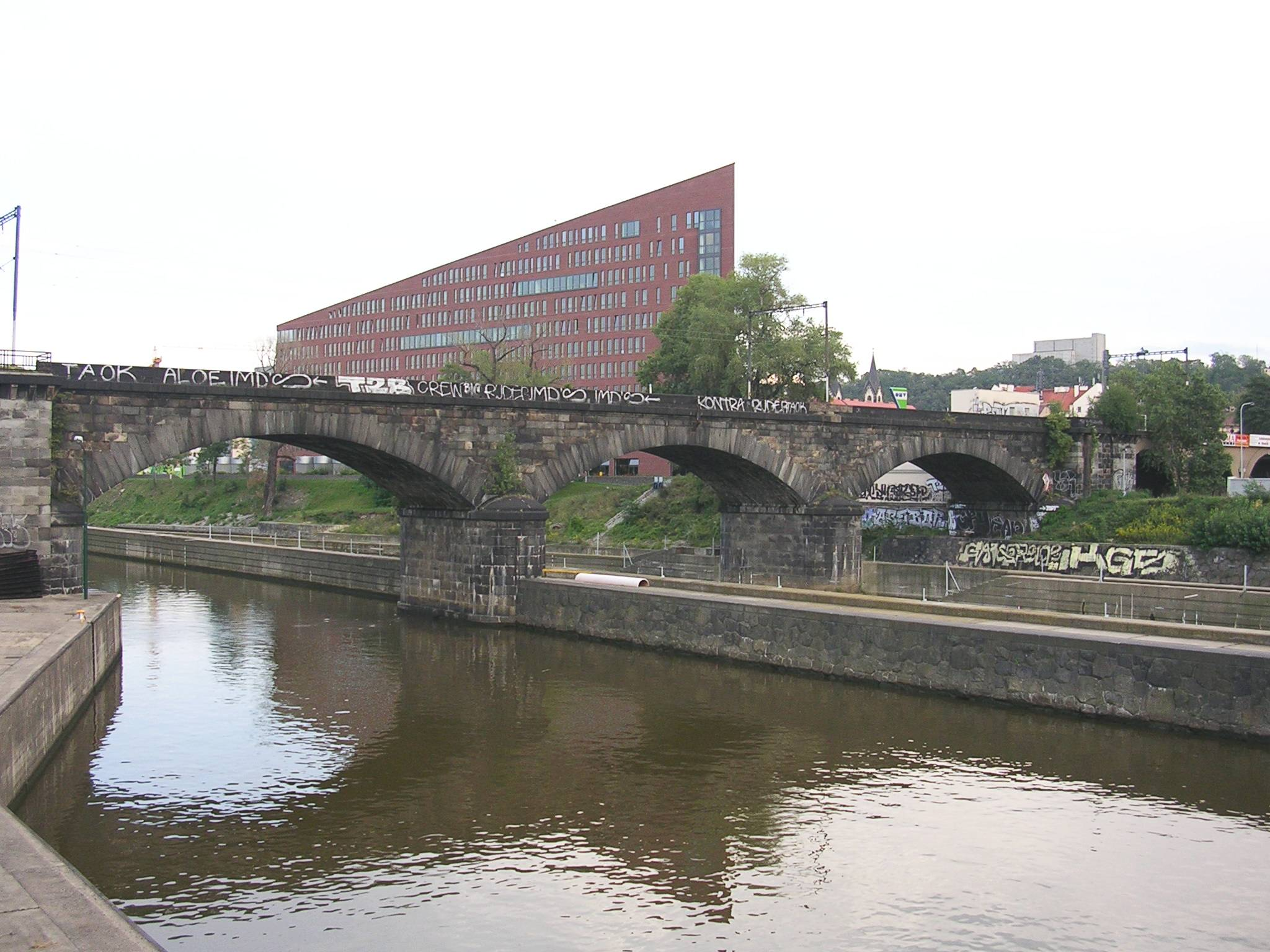
Viaduct – the right branch of the Vltava

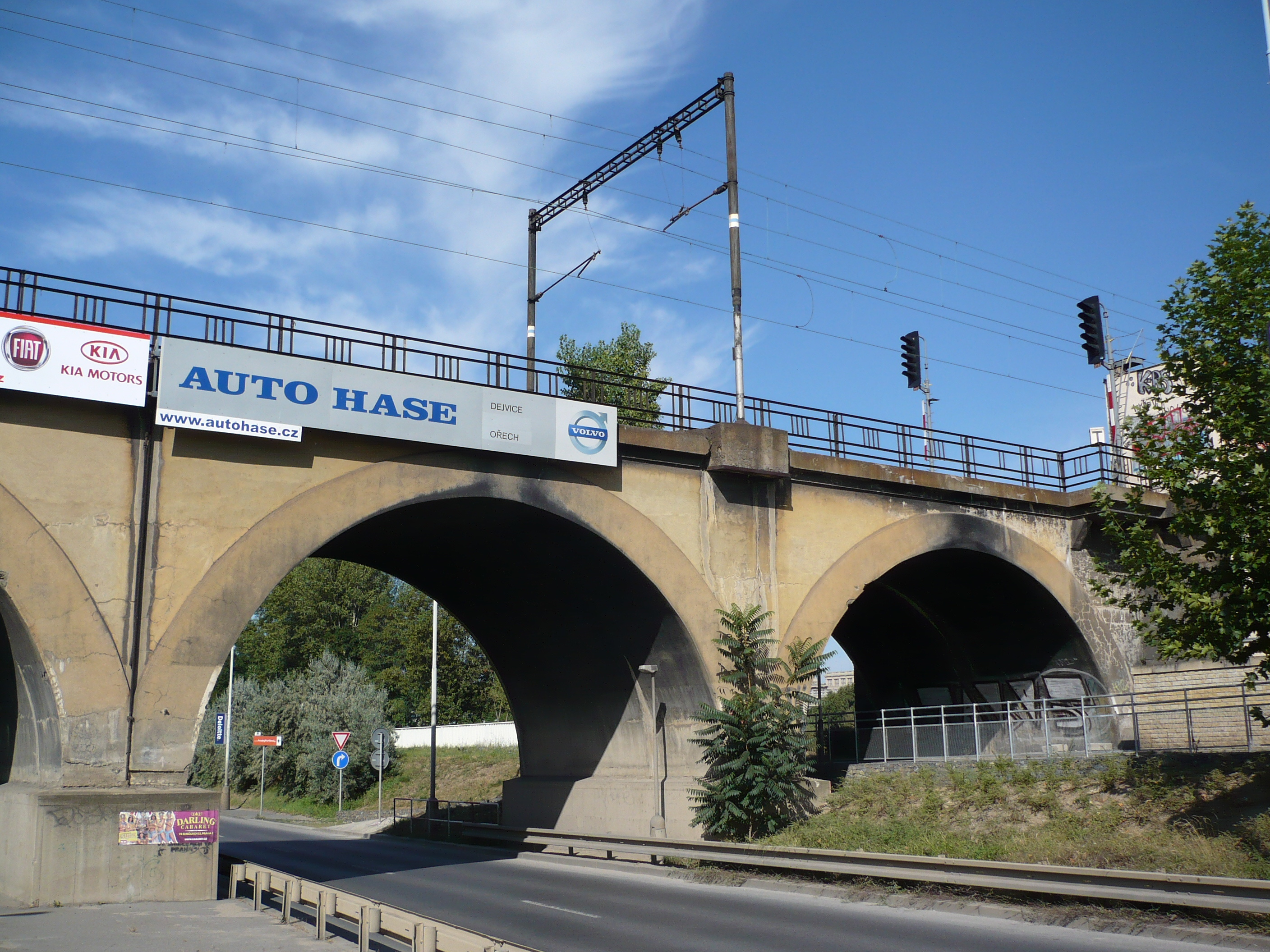
Viaduct section where traces of steam locomotives, riding the now discontinued railway line to nádraží Praha-Těšnov, are visible

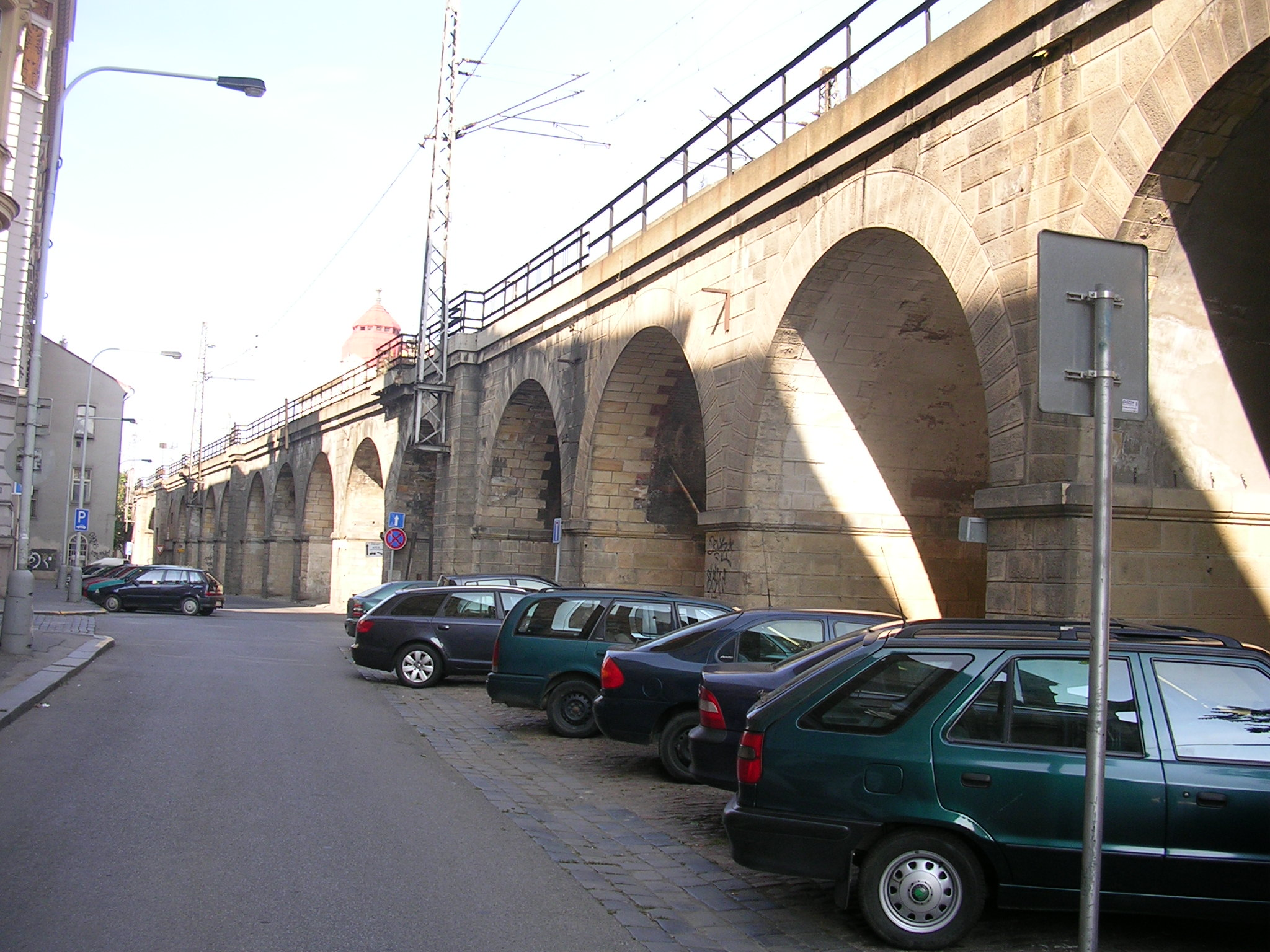
Viaduct – První pluk street

The Negrelli Viaduct (Czech: Negrelliho viadukt by Alois Negrelli, also known as the Karlín Viaduct,), Czech Republic, is a railway bridge over Štvanice Island that connects Masaryk Railway Station in central Prague with a railway station in Bubny. It is the historically first Prague railway bridge over the Vltava River and currently Prague's second oldest bridge over the river.

It is also the longest railway bridge and third longest bridge in the Czech Republic.

The viaduct was declared a Czech cultural monument in 1964.

== History ==
=== Construction ===
The Karlín Viaduct was built as part of the Dresden branch of the Northern State Railways Olomouc-Prague-Dresden project, which was approved by the State Railways Directorate in 1842. The construction started in spring 1846, was completed in 1849 and the bridge was put into operation on June 1st, 1850. The construction costs amounted to one and a half million florins.

At that time the bridge had 87 stone arches, eight of which stood directly in the Vltava River. The railway line was double-tracked and in the second half of the 19th century a third blind shunting track was laid. The width of the bridge deck between the stone railings is 7.6 m. The length is 1100 meters and until 1910 it was Europe's longest bridge.

The construction was to be entrusted to Jan Perner, who already led the construction of the line between Olomouc and Prague, but he unexpectedly died and Alois Negrelli took over the bridgework.

The viaduct was built over the then unregulated river. Granite, mined in the Schwarzenberg Quarry, which is now flooded with the Orlík Reservoir, was ferried from Kamýk nad Vltavou and processed on site.

The entire viaduct had vaults made of block masonry, Czech granite and pillar cladding were made of sandstone with granite blocks on the corners. The core of the masonry is made of quarry stone, the pillars are based on wooden gratings

Up to 3000 workers of different nationalities participated in the construction. For the first time, steam lifting machines were used to a large extent.

Worldwide, it was quite a unique structure, as in many places at that time similar bridges were built from wood and not from granite.

=== Operation and maintenance ===
The viaduct during the flood of May 1872

Later, houses were erected in close proximity to the bridge. With the growing industry, space under its arches were filled with craft workshops and shipping companies, mostly with built-in floors.

In 1871 the bridge was extended on the south side by the Karlín connecting viaduct to enable a direct connection between Bubny and Libeň.

At the turn of the 19th and 20th centuries extensive adjustments were made to the Vltava River, and three branches under the Negrelli Viaduct near the former Šaškovy mlýny (Šaškovy mills) north of Pobřežní Street were back-filled.

By the end of the 19th century, critics pointed out that the bridge was an obstacle to the development and permeability of the city.

In 1952–1954, three bridge arches were demolished in the area of Křižíkova Street to improve the throughput of motor vehicles. The newly created gap was bridged over by beamed lintels made of pre-stressed concrete. In 1981 a similar intervention was carried out on the Holesovice side, above the Bubenske embankment.

The viaduct survived the August 2002 flood in full operation.

=== Reconstruction 2017–2020 ===
A major bridge reconstruction started in July 2017 and involved the demolition of 18 arches, which had to subsequently be rebuilt. Complications discovered during the project added a further 150 million Czech koruna (CZK) to the reconstruction costs, which had increased by 2019 to around 1.5 billion CZK.

On 1 June 2020 the first trains passed over the viaduct since its repair. Its final cost amounted to 1.96 billion CZK.

== See also ==
- Jan Fischer, Ondřej Fischer: Pražské mosty. Academia, Praha 1985, ISBN 80-86699-44-7, p. 29–34.
