= Couvreur =

Couvreur (French for slater) is a surname. Notable people with the name include:

- Bénédicte Couvreur, French film producer
- Hilaire Couvreur (1924–1998), Belgian cyclist
- Jessie Catherine Couvreur (1848–1897), Australian novelist
- Joris Couvreur, Belgian ambassador in Bogota, Colombia
- Martine Carrillon-Couvreur (born 1948), member of the National Assembly of France
- Olivier Couvreur (born 1970), French champion driver
- Séraphin Couvreur (1835–1919), French Jesuit sinologist

Lecouvreur is a surname. Notable people with the surname include:

- Adrienne Lecouvreur, (1692–1730), French actress
- Adriana Lecouvreur, an opera in four acts by Francesco Cilea
