= Jacques-Marie Le Père =

French civil engineer

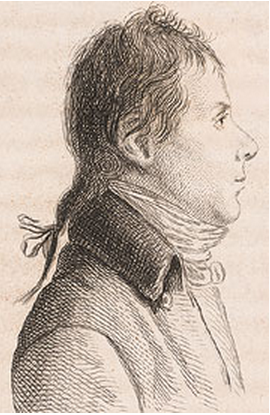
- Born: April 25, 1763; Paris, France
- Died: June 15, 1841 (aged 78); Granville, France

Jacques-Marie Le Père (Paris, 25 April 1763 – Granville, 15 June 1841) was a French civil engineer.

== Life ==
He accompanied the French Campaign in Egypt and Syria, was director of 'Ponts et Chaussées' (bridges and roads) in Egypt. After accompanying the expedition to the remains of the Canal of the Pharaohs, built by Necho II between the River Nile and the Gulf of Suez and improved by Ptolemy II, he was commissioned by Bonaparte to edit an account of the Canal. He was made a member of the Institut d'Égypte on 22 August 1798, in the mathematics section.

With his brother Gratien and other engineers working alongside them, he carried out three building programmes (from 19 January to 5 February 1799, in September 1799, and finally in November to December 1799) to measure the levels of the isthmus, in difficult conditions due to Bedouin attacks and the lack of water. In the rain, he concluded that there was a 9 m difference between the levels of the Mediterranean and Red Sea, an error which persisted until the measurements carried out by Paul-Adrien Bourdaloue in 1847.

After his return to France, he spent a long time as divisional inspector of 'ponts et chaussées' in Paris, then as inspector of Paris from 1822 to 1830.

== Works ==
- Mémoire sur la communication de la mer des Indes à la Méditerranée par la mer Rouge et l’isthme de Soueys, in Description de l'Égypte, l'État moderne, vol XI, Paris, Imprimerie Panckouke, 1822.
- Mémoire sur la vallée du Nil et le nilomètre de l'île de Roudah, in Description de l'Égypte, l'État moderne II (2e Partie) (p. 527 - 570), Imprimerie Royale, Paris, 1822
