= Isthmus of Suez =

Land bridge between mainland Asia and Africa

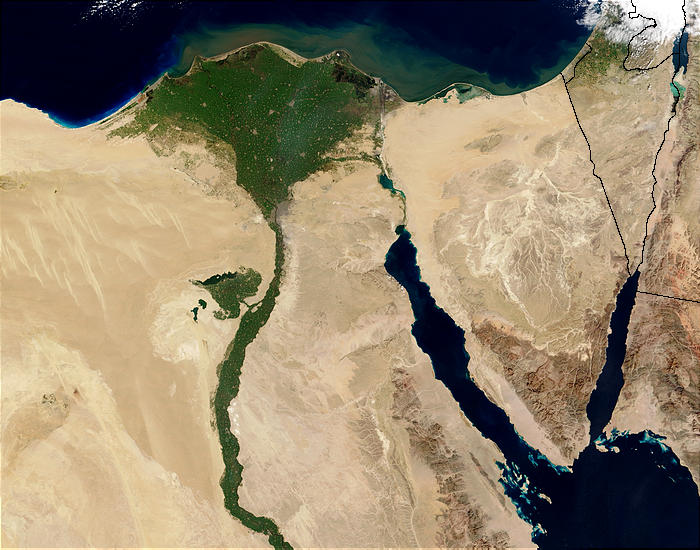
Nile River and delta from orbit

The Isthmus of Suez is the 125-kilometre-wide (78 mi) land bridge that lies between the Mediterranean Sea and the Red Sea, east of the Suez Canal, the boundary between the continents of Africa and Asia. To the south is the Gulf of Suez, dividing mainland Egypt from the Sinai Peninsula. The area is mostly flat and barren, with a few hills and rocky outcroppings. The climate is hot and dry, with very little rainfall.

The Isthmus of Suez is located within the country of Egypt. The ancient Egyptians built a canal through the isthmus, which was later expanded and improved by the Persians, the Ptolemies, and the Romans.

== Suez Canal ==
In 1869, a new canal was built through the isthmus, known as the Suez Canal. The canal is one of the busiest shipping routes in the world and is a major source of revenue for Egypt. The Suez Canal allows ships to travel between the Mediterranean Sea and the Indian Ocean without having to sail around Africa, saving time and fuel.

== See also ==
- Sinai Peninsula
