= Qantara Sharq =

City on the Suez Canal, Ismailia, Egypt

El-Qantara el-Sharqîya القنطرة الشرقية
- Town
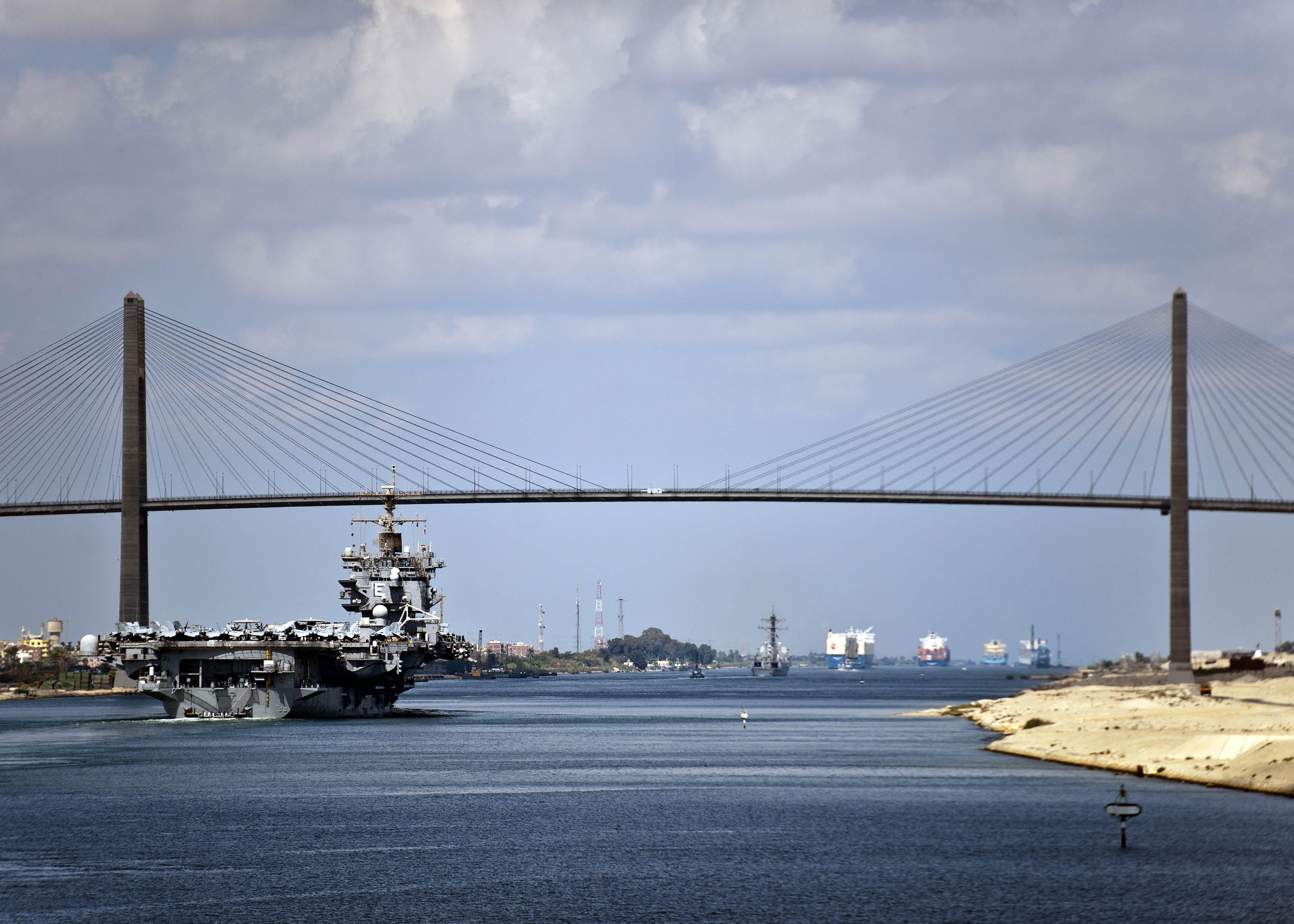
- The Suez Canal Bridge in El Qantara, Egypt.

- Location in Egypt
- Coordinates: 30°52′11″N 32°20′04″E
- Country: Egypt
- Governorate: Ismailia

Area
  - Total: 120 km^{2} (46 sq mi)

Population (2023)
  - Total: 33,358
  - Density: 280/km^{2} (720/sq mi)
- Time zone: UTC+2 (EET)
  - Summer (DST): UTC+3 (EEST)

Qantara Sharq is an Egyptian center and city situated on the east bank of the Suez Canal in the Sinai Peninsula, on the northern border of Ismailia Governorate. It is connected to Qantara Gharb by the Suez Canal Bridge. The city was constructed upon the remains of an ancient Roman-era cemetery, which was known as Tharu during the ancient Egyptian era and Sela in Greek and Roman writings. Dr. Zahi Hawass, former Minister of State for Antiquities, has announced that 288 pieces of antiquities that were stolen from the Qantara Sharq warehouse in the early days of the January 25 Revolution have been recovered in cooperation with the Sinai Bedouins.

The city is home to a military fortress constructed by the Mamluk Sultan Qansuh al-Ghuri. This fortress, which covers an area of 300 square meters, is similar in design to a fortress built by Al-Ghuri in Aleppo, Syria. The castle encompasses a military industrial city and a glass factory.

It is postulated that the construction of a tunnel beneath the Suez Canal, linking Qantara Sharq and Qantara Gharb, would stimulate investment activity in Qantara Sharq. This is because the tunnel would eliminate the daily inconvenience currently experienced by investors and workers in their daily commute between the east and west banks of the Suez Canal. El-Salam Canal passes through the city after crossing the Suez Canal through a dam. The Sinai Railway passes near the city, which crosses the canal through the El-Ferdan Railway Bridge and heads to Bir al-Abd. The city is also connected to the unified electrical grid of Egypt, and it is considered the first city liberated in the October War. In 2004, the city was subjected to an infestation of locusts.

== Administrative divisions ==
Qantara Sharq is one of the cities of the Sinai Peninsula. It was established as Qantara Sharq following the construction of the Suez Canal, although it had been inhabited for a considerable period prior to this. Indeed, it was an area that was settled by the Holy Family approximately 2000 years ago, with the intention of resting in its land for an extended period. Qantara Sharq was recently one of the cities of Sinai Governorate, the second largest city in the Sinai Peninsula. Since the inception of local government laws, the Sinai Peninsula was subject to military rule as a border governorate until 1965, when it was subjected to local government and the first municipal council was established. However, this did not last long, as the 1967 war soon broke out. In the days following the fifth of June, the Egyptian region under occupation was completed by Qantara Sharq and the days then proceeded according to their well-known cycle until the crossing of the Suez Canal happened. On the third day, following a defense from the Israeli army, at sunset on October 8, Qantara Sharq was liberated, marking the first Egyptian city to be liberated. Since that day, October 8th has been commemorated as a national holiday for the city of Qantara Sharq.

In 1978, within the framework of public policy, the state initiated the process of restoring normal life and established the local unit of the city of Qantara Sharq to commence the receipt and service of citizens. On April 12, 1979, the President of the Republic issued a decree that divided Sinai into two governorates, North and South, and annexed Qantara Sharq to Ismailia governorate. At that time, the local unit received the city, which had been reduced to a state of ruin. The houses had been demolished, the facilities were in a state of disrepair, and the infrastructure was severely degraded. In March 1996, the Prime Minister issued a decree to transform Qantara Sharq into a city and center, encompassing the villages of Al-Taqaddam, Al-Abtal, and Gilbana.

== The Battle of Qantara Sharq ==
The forts constructed by the adversary in the Qantara Sharq sector constituted some of the most formidable forts of the Bar-Lev line, with as many as seven forts in total. Engaging in combat within the cityscape proved to be a challenging endeavor, as the tactics employed in urban warfare differed significantly from those employed in the desert. Consequently, the intensity of combat persisted throughout the day. At the conclusion of October 7th, the military forces of the 18th Infantry Division, commanded by Brigadier General Fouad Aziz Ghali, had managed to encircle and control the city, thus laying the groundwork for its ultimate liberation. On Monday, October 8, the 18th Infantry Division was able to liberate the city of Qantara Sharq after a prolonged siege, both internally and externally, and a subsequent assault. The conflict took place in the city's streets and within its buildings until the opposing forces were forced to withdraw. The division seized a considerable quantity of enemy weapons and equipment, including a number of tanks, and captured thirty enemy personnel, all those who remained in the city. At 9:30 pm on October 8, the city's liberation was announced on Radio Cairo, which had a positive effect on the morale of the population. Galal Amer, a highly regarded journalist, held the rank of company commander in the 18th Infantry Division and played a role in the liberation of the city.

== Technology Valley ==
The Technology Valley is situated in the northwestern region of the Sinai Peninsula, under the jurisdiction of the city of Qantara Sharq in Ismailia, and approximately 10 kilometers east of the Suez Canal. The area in question has a total area of 16,000 feddans, with the work itself divided into several phases. Each phase involves 3,000 feddans, with 215 feddans of the first phase designated as an urgent phase. An agreement was reached between the Egyptian and Korean governments to assess the viability of the project from a marketing and economic perspective. Despite the expenditure of EGP 37 million on the infrastructure of the initial phase of the Technology Valley, and the engagement of six international companies in 1997 to construct factories with 70% of their output destined for export and 30% for the local market, work in the Valley was abruptly terminated.

== Tharu Fortress ==
The site is situated on the former route of the Horus Military Road, which connected Egypt and Palestine during the 18th Dynasty of the New Kingdom period. It encompasses an area of 150 by 150 meters and is constructed of adobe bricks, with rectangular defensive towers supporting the structure. The walls of the fortress are four meters in thickness. This discovery represents a significant advancement in our understanding of the defense system of the eastern Egyptian gate in the New Kingdom era. Inscribed on the walls of the Karnak Temple in Luxor from the era of King Seti I, this system was constructed on the ruins of a Hyksos-era military base that had previously protected the area from the east. These discoveries provide insight into a pivotal aspect of the Egyptian liberation war against the Hyksos and their subsequent expulsion from Egypt through the eastern entrance of North Sinai. Tharu is one of 11 fortresses constructed during the Pharaonic period at the beginning of the road between Qantara and Rafah.

== Discovering Ramses II's army headquarters in Sinai ==
The Egyptian archaeological mission has revealed the architectural characteristics of the largest Egyptian fortified city from the New Kingdom era. This was achieved through the archaeological excavation of the ancient Horus Road fortresses situated between Egypt and Palestine, spanning from Qantara Sharq to Egyptian Rafah. The mission discovered the remains of the headquarters of the Egyptian army in Sinai during the reign of King Ramses II. The adobe citadel, which measures 500 meters long and 250 meters wide, features high towers each four meters high and 20 meters wide. It served as the headquarters of the Egyptian army from the New Kingdom (1569-1081 BC) until the Ptolemaic era (31-305 AD).

== Qantara Sharq Cemetery ==
During the excavation of the Suez Canal, which involved the construction of numerous facilities in the area, the excavation and construction work led to the discovery of the remains of a cemetery. Additionally, several attempts were made to uncover the cemetery's remains through visits to the site or archaeological survey work from 1888 to 1913, in addition to historical studies on the site. The term "Qantara" may have originated from an earlier designation, as it was referenced on the map of the French campaign as the Qantara Bridge and is postulated to have been influenced by the Qantara, which spanned the ancient Belusian branch of the Nile that traversed into Sinai until its termination at the city of Beluzium Tal Al-Farma Al-Hayala. The ancient Qanatra is inscribed on the walls of the Karnak Temple and depicts the return journey of King Seti I via the ancient Horus Warpath.

The current site of Qantara Sharq did not yield any evidence of the Pharaonic era or the New Kingdom in particular. Instead, the remains of the Roman cemetery, upon which the modern city on the eastern bank of the Suez Canal was built, were uncovered. The archaeological work in the area commenced with the Department of Antiquities' investigations in 1911, as well as the French expedition of the Suez Canal Company during the canal's construction in 1914. The Egyptian Antiquities Authority subsequently uncovered several sites of the necropolis during the seasons of 1981-1983 and 1986.

The shape of the burials and tombs recovered from the excavations of the Roman necropolis can be described as follows:

1. The interment chambers are constructed of red brick and feature a vaulted ceiling, designed to accommodate a single individual.
2. Barrel-shaped earthenware coffins are composed of two pieces that can be sealed at the wide mouth with red brick, adobe, or clay molds.
3. The archaeological record reveals the existence of one-piece boat-shaped pottery coffins.
4. The sarcophagi were carved from stone and had a limestone lid. They were placed inside a pit that was directly on the sand.
5. A rectangular chamber constructed from pieces of limestone in the shape of a rectangle, intended for one or several neighboring tombs.
6. The site comprises a mass grave with a vaulted ceiling, constructed of adobe or red brick.
7. The practice of interring Adamic structures in sand pits is a common one. These structures are buried directly in the sand, often with a plaster mask, which may be gilded and blue-colored.

On occasion, stelae inscribed in Ancient Greek are discovered that contain funerary phrases elucidating the age, occupation, and title of the deceased, in addition to prayers. A substantial assemblage of pottery and gold artifacts was unearthed within the tombs. It can be demonstrated that the cemetery was utilized during the Roman era, although its usage can be traced back to the Ptolemaic era, as evidenced by the discovery of tomb remains and monuments dating to that era. The Qantara Sharq cemetery is believed to have served as the burial ground for the site of Tell Abu Safi, also known as the Roman castle of Silat, situated approximately 2.5 kilometers to the east of Qantara Sharq.

== Qatiya Mosque ==
The mosque is situated in a village of the same name, approximately 30 kilometers from Qantara Sharq. This region is characterized by a prevalence of palm trees. The mosque building is constructed of red bricks and has an area of 13 x 10 meters. It features three porticoes and is supported by four octagonal pillars. The minaret is located on the northwestern side. The site is accessed via a staircase. The mihrab is situated on the exterior of the southern wall, while the area in front of the mosque is designated for ablution. This includes a water well, cistern, and ablution basins. The North Sinai Antiquities District has undertaken the restoration of the mosque, employing the same brick material and a height of one meter.

== International Conference on Human Genealogy ==
The inaugural international conference on the study of human strains, bones, tombs, and burials in ancient Egypt was convened by the Council in collaboration with the Scientific Center for Antiquities in Qantara Sharq. The conference drew participation from 100 scientists representing 1 In addition to Egyptian archaeologists, the conference was attended by representatives from two foreign countries and a large number of Egyptian antiquities experts, including Dr. Mohamed El-Saghir, head of the Egyptian Antiquities Sector, and Dr. Fikry Hassan, professor of Egyptology at the University of London.
