= Manfalut train–bus collision =

2012 rail disaster in Manfalut, Egypt

Manfalut railway accident
- Location of accident in Manfalut, Egypt

Details
- Date: 17 November 2012
- Location: Manfalut
- Coordinates: 27°19′N 30°58′E
- Country: Egypt
- Operator: Egyptian National Railways
- Incident type: Level crossing accident

Statistics
- Trains: 1
- Deaths: 51
- Injured: 17

The Manfalut Train-bus collision occurred on 17 November 2012 when a school bus, which was carrying about 70 school children between four and six years old, was hit by a train on a rail crossing near Manfalut, Egypt, 350 km (230 miles) south of the Egyptian capital Cairo. At least 50 children and the bus driver died in the crash, and about 17 people were injured. Witnesses reported that barriers at the crossing were not closed when the crash occurred.

The train that struck the bus was an Egyptian Railways passenger train, which was pulled by two Egyptian Railways Henschel AA22T diesel locomotives, ENR 3054 and ENR 3086. After the crash, a number of people began searching the tracks to find the remains of their children and victims they knew. Additionally, schoolbags and schoolbooks were scattered across the tracks. Police did not arrive until two hours after the accident, and by the time the first ambulance came, most of the children were dead. Afterwards, the families of the victims protested at the crash site.

The Egyptian minister of transportation, Mohammad Rashad Al Matini, and the head of the railways authority resigned after the accident. President Mohamed Morsi pledged to hold those responsible accountable. The crossing worker, who was allegedly asleep, was detained, and Ibrahim El-Zaafrani, the secretary-general of the relief committee of the Arab Doctors Union, said that E£10,000 (about $1,600) will be awarded to families of the dead and E£5,000 (about $800) to families of the injured.
