= Ahmed Samir =

Ahmed Samir may refer to:

- Ahmed Samir (footballer, born 1981), Egyptian player
- Ahmed Samir Farag, Egyptian footballer
- Ahmed Samir (footballer, born 1991), Jordanian player
- Ahmed Samir (footballer, born 1994), Egyptian player
- Ahmed Samir (politician), Egyptian minister
