= Battle of Katia =

Battle during the Defence of the Suez Canal Campaign of World War I

Coordinates: 30°58′00″N 32°45′00″E

- Part of the Middle Eastern theatre of World War I
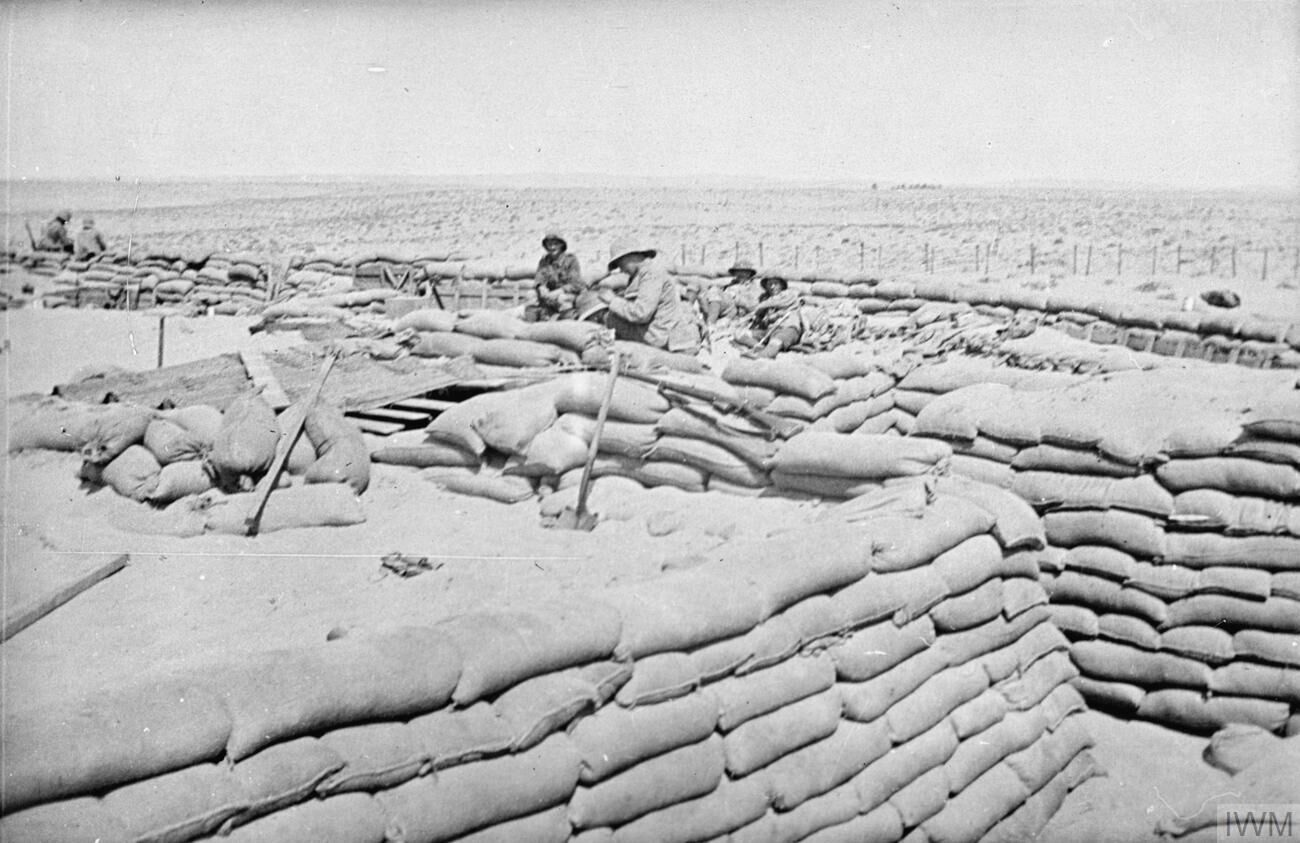
- 1st Scottish Horse troopers in a redoubt at Duidar, Summer 1916
Date	23 April 1916
Location	Oghratina, Katia and Duidar east of the Suez Canal and north of El Ferdan Station
Result	Ottoman victory

Belligerents
British Empire	Ottoman Empire

Commanders and leaders
(United Kingdom) Edgar Askin Wiggin	(German Empire) Kress von Kressenstein

Units involved
5th Mounted Brigade	1st and 2nd Battalions; 1 company of 32nd Regiment four companies of an irregular camel regiment and two independent companies

Strength
1,500	3,650

Casualties and losses
500	Unknown

The Battle of Katia, also known as the Affair of Qatia by the British, was an engagement fought east of the Suez Canal and north of El Ferdan Station, in the vicinity of Katia and Oghratina, on 23 April 1916 during the Defence of the Suez Canal Campaign of World War I. An Ottoman force led by the German General Friedrich Freiherr Kress von Kressenstein made a surprise attack on three and a half squadrons of the British 5th Mounted Brigade, which was widely scattered to the east of Romani. The mounted brigade had been ordered to the area to protect the new railway and water pipeline being built from Kantara on the Suez Canal, as this infrastructure extended out past the Canal's zone of defences into the Sinai Peninsula towards Romani. Kress Von Kressenstein's attack was completely successful, decimating the equivalent of little more than a regiment. On the same day, an associated Ottoman attack on Duidar, very close to the Suez Canal, failed when it met with strong British opposition.

Kress von Kressenstein's force had been active in the area since the First Suez Offensive of early 1915, when three columns attacked the Canal along the northern, central, and southern routes across the Sinai Peninsula. The growing Imperial strength made attacks on the Suez Canal difficult, and ended the dominance of the Ottoman force in the area. The Ottoman Empire's attacks on 23 April demonstrated their intention to continue opposing the British Empire in the region.

However, the Imperial reaction to these attacks was to double the strength of their forces. The 2nd Light Horse Brigade, and the New Zealand Mounted Rifles Brigade, were sent to Katia and Romani and established a strong Imperial presence over the contested ground. Soon after, the Australian 1st Light Horse Brigade was also sent forward, and the 52nd (Lowland) Division arrived at Romani not long after. At the beginning of August, the Battle of Romani was fought over much of the same ground as that at Katia.

== Background ==
In 1915, Sir Archibald Murray, the Imperial Commander in Chief of Egypt, partially addressed the threat of von Kressenstein's forces to the Suez Canal by organising the defences into three sectors. No. 1 (Southern) sector, with its headquarters at Suez, covered the area from Suez to Kabrit, No. 2 (Central) sector, with its headquarters at Ismailia, covered the area from Kabrit to Ferdan, and No. 3 (Northern) sector, with its headquarters at Port Said, covered the area from Ferdan to Port Said. The No. 3 sector also had an advanced headquarters at Kantara. To support these forward defences, the British Empire improved their lines of communication by doubling the single railway line that ran from Cairo to the Suez Canal, and also pumped water from the River Nile along the Sweet Water Canal to supply the troops and the towns on the Suez Canal. (Note: The towns on the Suez Canal are Port Said at the Mediterranean Sea end in the north, Ismailia near the Bitter Lakes approximately half way along the canal, and Suez on the Red Sea at the southern end of the canal.)

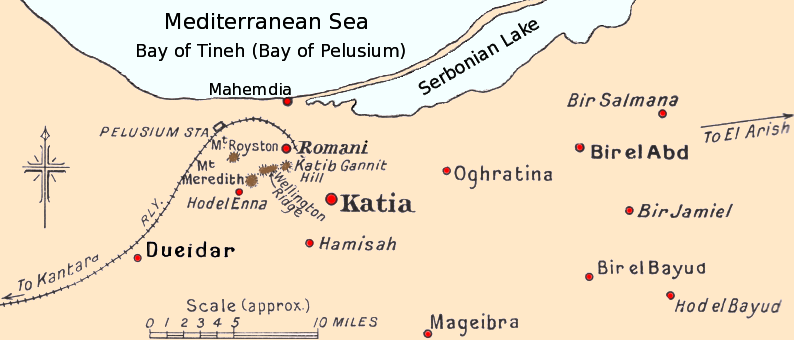
Map of the Katia and Romani area

After the conclusion of the Gallipoli Campaign, both sides had large numbers of troops available for redeployment, and the British decided to move their Suez Canal defences from positions on the canal eastwards into the Sinai desert. Murray aimed to extend the railway and water pipeline to Katia, so that a permanent forward Imperial base of 50,000 men could be established. In February 1916, he requested permission from the War Office in London to extend this infrastructure further across the Sinai to El Arish. He considered that such an advance along the northern route, combined with the destruction of the central route's water sources and regular patrols from a base at El Arish, would permanently secure the Suez Canal. An advance to Katia was agreed by the War Office, but no decision was made regarding an advance to El Arish.

The first shipload of rails and sleepers arrived at Kantara on 10 March and, four weeks later, 16 miles (26 km) of track stretching towards Katia had been laid by the Egyptian Labour Corps and Royal Engineers. There were also two new appointments: Brigadier General Edgar Askin Wiggin took command of the Katia district on 6 April and, three days later, Major General H. A. Lawrence became responsible for No. 3 Sector of the canal defences, which covered the northern section.

Meanwhile, several raids were undertaken by the Australian Light Horse and the Bikaner Camel Corps, accompanied by the Egyptian Camel Transport Corps carrying supplies, rations and ammunition. The purpose of these raids was to destroy water sources on the central inland route, which had been used by the Ottomans during the First Suez Offensive in late January and early February 1915.

To provide forward protection for the railway construction workers and the infrastructure, the 5th Mounted Brigade was ordered to move to Katia. By early April, however, signs of renewed Ottoman activity in the area were detected and, as a result, the 5th Light Horse Regiment was ordered to reinforce the 5th Mounted Brigade; it was due to arrive at Katia on 24 April.

== Prelude ==
=== Ottoman forces ===
Kress von Kressenstein moved to challenge the growing Imperial presence with a force of ninety-five officers 3,560 other ranks comprising 1st and 2nd Battalions and one company of the 3rd Battalion, 32nd Regiment, a regiment of Arab irregulars on camels, and six mountain guns, a 75-mm battery of the 8th F. A. Regiment and two guns of the 9th F. A. Regiment (one and a half batteries), two field ambulances and an ammunition column. (Note: These were four gun artillery batteries.[Erickson 2001, p. 155])

The Ottoman and Arab force travelled across the Sinai Peninsula on the northern route, which runs not far from the coast of the Mediterranean Sea and nearly parallel with it. A series of oases with date palms and reliable water stretch for 15 miles (24 km) from Bir el Abd in the east to Oghratina, Katia and Romani near the Suez Canal. These oases make the northern route from the Ottoman-Egyptian Frontier at Rafa to El Arish and Romani viable, and British strategists thought it possible that 250,000 Ottoman troops could cross the Sinai, and 80,000 be based permanently in this fertile area. Whoever could hold the contested ground in the area of Katia and Romani would be in a position to protect the Canal, or within striking distance. The area was patrolled almost daily by Ottoman aircraft, which bombed the recently established Katia camp on 20 April, and both Katia and Romani the next day.

=== Imperial deployments ===
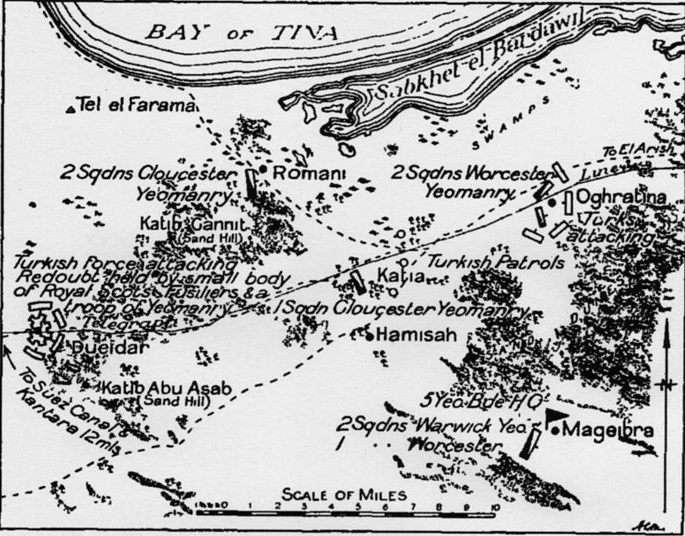
Map showing positions of the 5th Mounted Brigade on 23 April 1916

23 April 1916 was St George's Day and also Easter Sunday, and dawn found the 5th Mounted Brigade, dispersed over a wide area. The brigade was made up of the Warwickshire Yeomanry, the Royal Gloucestershire Hussars, and the Queen's Own Worcestershire Hussars (Worcestershire Yeomanry). These regiments were deployed as follows: At Oghrantina were two squadrons of Worcestershire Hussars (less one troop), with four officers and 60 other ranks of the 2/2nd Lowland Field Company[Royal Engineers. At Katia were one squadron and a machine gun subsection of the Gloucestershire Hussars, along with 40 dismounted men of the Worcestershire Hussars, and a detail from the Royal Army Medical Corps, Army Veterinary Corps and camel transport. At Bir el Hamisah were the Warwickshire Yeomanry (less one squadron), and one squadron and one troop from the Worcestershire Hussars. At Romani, near Pelusium, were the Gloucestershire Hussars (less one squadron), and a machine gun subsection in reserve.

At the small oasis of Dueidar 13 miles (21 km) south south west of Katia were 156 men; 120 from the 5th Battalion, Royal Scots Fusiliers and thirty-six from the Bikanir Camel Corps, including a few Yeomanry. The 4th Battalion, Royal Scots Fusiliers of the 52nd (Lowland) Division, were holding Hill 70, 5 miles (8.0 km) behind Dueidar.

On 22 April Wiggin and his brigade headquarters, with one squadron and one troop of Worcestershire Hussars, had arrived at Bir el Hamisah from Katia. Wiggin moved there in response to an intelligence report that an Ottoman force was at Bir el Mageibra some distance to the south and, with the agreement of his commander H. A. Lawrence, he prepared to launch a surprise attack. At dawn on 23 April, Wiggin found and destroyed a large but almost empty camp at Bir el Mageibra, capturing six prisoners. He was back at Bir el Hamisah by 09:00, having covered a distance of 16 miles (26 km), when he heard news of Ottoman attacks.

== Battle ==
=== Oghratina ===
The oasis at Oghratina had been occupied by a squadron from the Worcestershire Hussars and a dismounted detachment of Royal Engineers thirty-six hours before the Ottoman attack; a second squadron arrived just twelve hours before the attack, so defensive works had not been extensive. These squadrons stood to at 04:00 in dense sea-fog, which was common at that time of year. They heard the sound of pumps operating at wells 500 yards (460 m) to their south west, and an officer who investigated found about sixty Ottoman soldiers. The yeomanry completely surprised this small Ottoman force, opening fire and causing heavy casualties, but in following up their retreat, the yeomanry were met with very heavy rifle fire from a much larger force. Soon afterwards, British squadrons on the right were attacked, and by 05:15 the whole camp was being assaulted from north, east and south east in overwhelming strength at a range of 50 yards (46 m) or less.

The Ottoman attack began with heavy fire from light guns, machine guns and rifles. Although the commander of the yeomanry detachment had orders to retire if attacked in force, he could not leave the dismounted engineers. The Ottoman attack was resisted for two hours, but by 07:45 eleven yeomanry officers and 135 other ranks were casualties. The survivors, four officers and forty-two other ranks, surrendered.

=== Katia ===
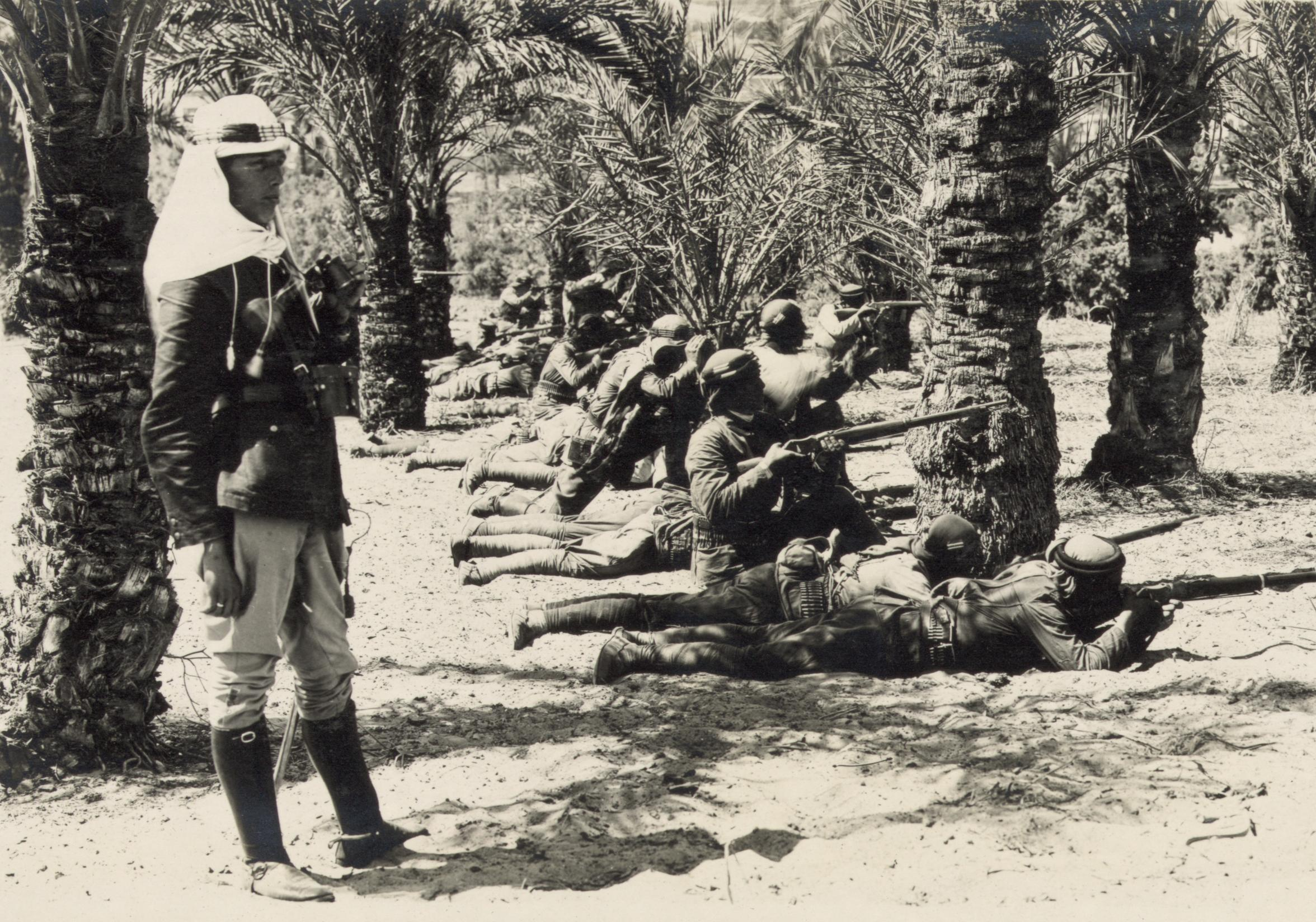
Ottoman troops at Katia

At 03:30 "A" Squadron Gloucestershire Hussars, under Captain Lloyd Baker, stood to arms and saddled up; a patrol was sent out and returned to report all clear. Soon afterwards a small Ottoman patrol fired on the yeomanry and retired. About 05:30 heavy fire was heard from Oghratina, and a message was received half an hour later that an attack had been repulsed. At 06:30 another message reported that the attack had been renewed, and a message from Romani reported that Dueidar had also been attacked. At 07:45 another Ottoman attack at Katia was driven off.

At 08:45 a patrol sent out towards Oghratina saw 600 Ottoman soldiers marching towards Katia in open order in two long lines about 1.5 miles (2.4 km) away, followed by more troops in a formed body, and cavalry advancing to the south west to surround Katia. At 09:45 a battery of mountain guns near Er Rabah opened fire on Katia from the north east, which killed or maimed some of the horses within a few minutes.

Rather than retiring to Romani or to Bir el Hamisah, Captain Lloyd Baker decided to stay at Katia and protect his party of Royal Engineers, hoping for support from Romani. The Gloucestershire squadron maintained rapid fire against the increasing numbers of Ottoman attackers, and just before 10:00 British reinforcements from Romani (Gloucestershire Hussars) and Bir el Hamisah (Worcestershire Hussars) converged on Katia and fought their way through to the garrison. Lieutenant Colonel Charles Coventry of the Worcestershire Hussars now took command of the garrison. Heavy fire from Ottoman rifles and machine guns continued for several hours at Katia, and the Ottomans gradually pressed in on the yeomanry's front and flanks. Eventually working their way to within 50 yards (46 m), the Ottomans rushed the garrison shortly before 15:00. The flank held by the Gloucestershire Hussars collapsed and Coventry then ordered a general surrender.

At about 13:30 Coventry had asked Captain W.H. Wiggin (brother of Brigadier General Wiggin) to bring up the horses to allow as many men as possible the chance of escape, but the captain fainted from the effects of a wound before he reached them. (Note: While fighting on foot one quarter of the yeomanry were holding the horses; a brigade was equivalent in rifle strength to an infantry battalion. [Preston 1921 p. 168]) When he came to, he saw the camp had been captured, and galloped with the surviving horses and horse holders to meet escaping yeomanry. A total of eighty men escaped, with Wiggin being the only officer to get away from Oghratina or Katia. The Gloucestershire Hussars lost 4 officers and 16 other ranks killed, 15 other ranks were wounded and 64 were taken prisoner. The casualties of the Worcestershire Hussars at Oghratina and Katia were even worse with a loss of 9 officers and 101 other ranks killed and 235 men taken prisoner. The regiment was almost wiped out – they mustered after the battle with just 54 NCOs and men.

=== Dueidar ===
At Dueidar the garrison of 156 men defended an area of just 450 by 150 yards (410 by 140 m) containing six small redoubts. At 04:00 a linesman was sent out to investigate a loss of communication with Katia; the commander of the garrison visited the posts under his command and sent out a patrol to the south east, ordering his troops to stand to arms. The patrol saw nothing in the mist, but at 05:17 a sentry saw a large group of Ottoman soldiers and opened fire on them. This alerted the nearest redoubt garrison armed with fifty men and a Lewis gun which swept the Ottoman ranks. So effective was the fire that the attackers soon fell back leaving twenty dead and wounded, while an Ottoman mountain gun battery was unable to find the British positions. At 07:00 Ottoman forces attempted to outflank the British position to the south, but were stopped by fire from a small defensive works on that flank containing one non-commissioned officer (NCO) and six men. Shortly afterwards Ottoman soldiers repeated their attack on the south eastern redoubt. Some of them got to within 20 yards (18 m) of the defensive barbed wire, but were again routed by steady fire.

=== British and Australian reinforcements ===
Brigadier General Wiggin ordered the Worcestershire Yeomanry to water at Bir el Hamisah and then advance on Katia, but before watering was complete they saw shells bursting at Katia, and moved off at 09:50 to reinforce the line of the Gloucester squadron on the left.

The remaining squadrons of Warwickshire Yeomanry, after watering at Bir el Hamisah, moved at 10:30 to attack the Hod um Ugba, which was north east of Katia and halfway between Bir el Hamisah and Katia. Wiggin moved off an hour later to attack the same place, and this force became engaged with Ottoman flanking troops. By 13:45 Wiggin had advanced about 1 mile (1.6 km) against very strong opposition, but soon afterwards he saw a commotion among the camels at Katia; the tents in the camp were burning and he decided that the best option was to fall back to Bir el Hamisah.

Reinforcements from Romani, commanded by Lieutenant Colonel R. M. Yorke, attacked the Ottoman force to the north of Katia, but were driven off. These five troops and a machine gun section of Gloucestershire Hussars moved out from Romani at 10:15 to intercept a column of 500 Ottoman soldiers retiring south-east from Dueidar. Shortly after leaving Romani, firing was heard from Katia, and from some high ground they could see the Ottoman artillery north of Er Rabah shelling the camp. When the Gloucestershire Hussars advanced towards the Ottoman artillery, it ceased fire, and fifteen minutes later was seen to withdraw some distance. The Gloucestershire Hussars pushed some Ottoman soldiers back to the high ground south of the Hod um Ugba, where Ottoman reinforcements stopped their advance. The strength of the Ottoman attacks made a gradual withdrawal necessary, but long halts were made to enable the wounded at Romani to retire also.

Unfortunately the Gloucestershire Hussars from Romani were not aware of Wiggin and his reinforcements on the other flank until it was too late, finally coming in sight of them at about 15:00. Wiggin had seen Yorke's force an hour earlier, but had not been able to communicate with it.

Dueidar was reinforced by two companies of 4th Battalion Royal Scots Fusiliers from Hill 70 on the railway 5 miles (8.0 km) to the rear. On approaching Dueidar, a small detachment of reinforcements was sent to the south eastern redoubt. The Ottoman firing line was found to be south of the Dueidar to Katia track and 200 yards (180 m) from the principal redoubt. Shortly after the mist cleared, a British aircraft dropped a message that the main Ottoman force was in retreat and that there were only about 150 rifles still attacking. A squadron of the Australian 5th Light Horse Regiment arrived at midday from Kantara, and moved off south east in pursuit of the main Ottoman force, while the garrison at Dueidar attacked the Ottoman rearguard which broke and fled, leaving behind seventeen unwounded troops who were taken prisoner. The remainder of 5th Light Horse Regiment arrived at Duidar at 13:30 and took up the pursuit. They captured one officer and thirty-one other ranks, and killed seventy-five men; there were fifty-five British casualties.

== Aftermath ==
The commander of 5th Mounted Brigade decided to retire towards the Suez Canal, and the two squadrons from Romani joined him, abandoning much equipment to ride overnight to Bir el Nuss. Wiggin arrived at Dueidar at 09:00 on 24 April with two squadrons. The 5th Mounted Brigade had been completely surprised; its commander and his important reserve force had been out of position at a critical time following false intelligence, and could not support his regiments. The three and a half squadrons at Oghratina and Katia were decimated—almost all were killed, wounded or captured.

The overwhelming success of the Ottoman Army's operations during the Battle of Katia demonstrated the attacking strength and determination of Kress von Kressenstein's force in 1916, and their efficient implementation of appropriate tactics, particularly timing and false intelligence. This success was underpinned by the Ottoman infantry's ability to make the gruelling march across the Sinai Peninsula and be fit enough to then launch attacks with force and determination.

On 24 April Romani was reoccupied and the commander of the Australian and New Zealand Mounted Division (Anzac Mounted Division), Major General Harry Chauvel, took command of the advance positions. The 2nd Light Horse Brigade and the New Zealand Mounted Rifles Brigade of the mounted division were ordered to Romani and reoccupied the area unopposed by any Ottoman force. The 52nd (Lowland) Division reinforced the garrison at Dueidar and also came under Chauvel's command.

After the battle the area was held by British forces with their main bases at Romani and Kantara. Regular patrols and reconnaissances were carried out over the oases area, until the issue was resolved at the Battle of Romani in August 1916 when British Empire forces won a decisive victory. (Note: For a description of the period from April to August, see the 'Occupation of Romani' and 'Reconnaissances May to June 1916' subsections of the Sinai and Palestine Campaign article.)

== Notes ==
Footnotes

Citations
