= Khalid Hashim =

Egyptian politician

- خالد هاشم

Minister of Trade and Industry
- Incumbent
- Assumed office February 2026
- President: Abdel Fattah el-Sisi
- Prime Minister: Mostafa Madbouly
- Preceded by: Kamel al-Wazir

Personal details
- Born: Egypt

Khalid Hashim (Arabic: خالد هاشم) is an Egyptian engineer and official who serves as the current Minister of industry, succeeding Kamel al-Wazir.
