= Everard Blair =

Indian-born English cricketer and soldier

- Born: Everard McLeod Blair; 26 July 1866; Bangalore, Mysore, British India
- Died: 16 May 1939 (aged 72); Northampton, Northamptonshire
- Military career
- Allegiance: United Kingdom
- Branch: British Army
- Service years: 1886–1918
- Rank: Brigadier-General
- Unit: Royal Engineers
- Conflicts: Sinai and Palestine Campaign (1916–1917)
- Awards: Order of St Michael and St George

Brigadier-General Everard McLeod Blair CMG (26 July 1866 – 16 May 1939) was an Indian-born English soldier and cricketer. Blair was a career soldier in the Royal Engineers, rising to the rank of Brigadier-General when he retired in 1918. He played in seven first-class cricket matches for Kent County Cricket Club between 1893 and 1900.

== Early life and education ==
Blair was born in 1866 at Bangalore, then in the state of Mysore in British India. His father, Gustavus Blair, was a Colonel in the Royal Artillery. Blair attended Cheltenham College where he represented the school in racquets and gymnastics as well as being in the cricket XI in 1883 and 1884. From Cheltenham he went on to the Royal Military Academy, Woolwich where he again played for the cricket team and, along with a Captain Hamilton, won the Military Racquets Cup in 1895.

== Military career ==
Blair was commissioned as a lieutenant in the Royal Engineers in February 1886. After serving in Hong Kong he was appointed instructor in fieldworks at the Royal School of Military Engineering at Chatham. In March 1896 he was promoted to captain and became an instructor at the Royal Military Academy from 1898 to 1903. Promotions to major, in 1904, and lieutenant-colonel, in 1912, followed.

During World War I Blair served primarily in Egypt and Palestine. He arrived in Alexandria in January 1916 and was appointed Chief Engineer for the Cairo District before being promoted to colonel and then temporary brigadier-general and made chief engineer for part of the Suez Canal between El Ferdan and Port Said, during which time he was Mentioned in Dispatches.

In October 1916 Blair was charge of water supply works to support the advance of British forces into Palestine. Pipelines were laid under Blair's leadership across the Sinai Desert from El Qantara, Egypt, first to El Arish in northern Sinai and then extended to Rafah in Palestine. The pipeline was completed after the Second Battle of Gaza in April 1917. Whilst the works were ongoing Blair was awarded the Order of St Michael and St George (CMG) in the 1917 New Year Honours.

Before the completion of the pipeline works Blair returned to England in March 1917 and served in the London Defences area. He was found medically unfit for services in February 1918 suffering from neurasthenia, a condition he had first suffered from in 1903. He was found permanently unfit for service in July 1918 and retired with the honorary rank of Brigadier-General in August. He was awarded the Silver War Badge.

== Cricketing career ==
Everard Blair
Cricket information
- Batting: Right-handed
- Bowling: Leg-break

Career statistics
| Competition | First-class |
|---|---|
| Matches | 7 |
| Runs scored | 190 |
| Batting average | 19.00 |
| 100s/50s | 0/1 |
| Top score | 61 |
| Catches/stumpings | 2/– |
- Source: CricInfo, 1 April 2017

Blair played cricket regularly for the Royal Engineers Cricket Club until 1905, scoring over 500 runs in five seasons and captaining the team in 1892 and 1893. He also played racquets, winning the Army Doubles Championship several times. He appeared in seven first-class cricket matches for Kent County Cricket Club, five in 1893 and one in each of the 1896 and 1900 season. In his first-class debut he scored 61 runs against Gloucestershire at the County Ground, Bristol, form which his Wisden obituary said that he "never regained", despite being "strong in defence with plenty of shots". He was described as a strong defensive player "with plenty of strokes" who "bowled slow leg-breaks and fielded admirably".

He became a member of Marylebone Cricket Club (MCC) in 1894 and played for them against Hertfordshire at Lord's in 1902. Whilst posted overseas he played for Hong Kong Cricket Club in five games in 1890 and 1891.

== Later life ==
Blair suffered from neurasthenia for the remainder of his life after retiring in 1918. He lived in Bath and was supported by his wife Nora who he had married in China in 1902. He died in St Andrew's Hospital in Northampton in May 1939 aged 72.

== Bibliography ==
- Carlaw, Derek (2020). Kent County Cricketers, A to Z: Part One (1806–1914) (PDF). Cardiff: ACS.
