= Nevine Gamea =

Egyptian woman politician

Nevine or Nevin Gamea was the Minister of Industry and Trade of Egypt. She came to the cabinet in December 2019. She is the first female minister to have this post since June 30, 2013. she was replaced with Ahmed Samir Saleh in a cabinet reshuffle in August 2022. During an interview, when asked, how is her ministry supporting the businesses because of COVID-19, she said:

"Since the onset of the COVID-19 crisis, MSMEDA has provided support for all its sponsored enterprises, particularly those that are negatively affected. The authority launched many initiatives to mitigate the effects of the crisis on MSMEs, including suspending or extending instalment repayment of the aggrieved enterprises. MSMEDA has also smoothed out application and establishment procedures for manufacturing detergents and medical activities amid the crisis."

== Early life and education ==
Gamea studied at the Faculty of Commerce at Cairo University. She has also worked in the National Bank of Kuwait and the National Bank of Development (NBD).

== Previous positions held ==
- Secretary-General of the Social Fund for Development (SFD), 2016
- CEO of the Small, Medium and Micro Enterprise Development Agency, 2017
