= Suez Canal overhead powerline crossing =

Major powerline crossing in Suez, Egypt

Coordinates: 29.996°N 32.583°E

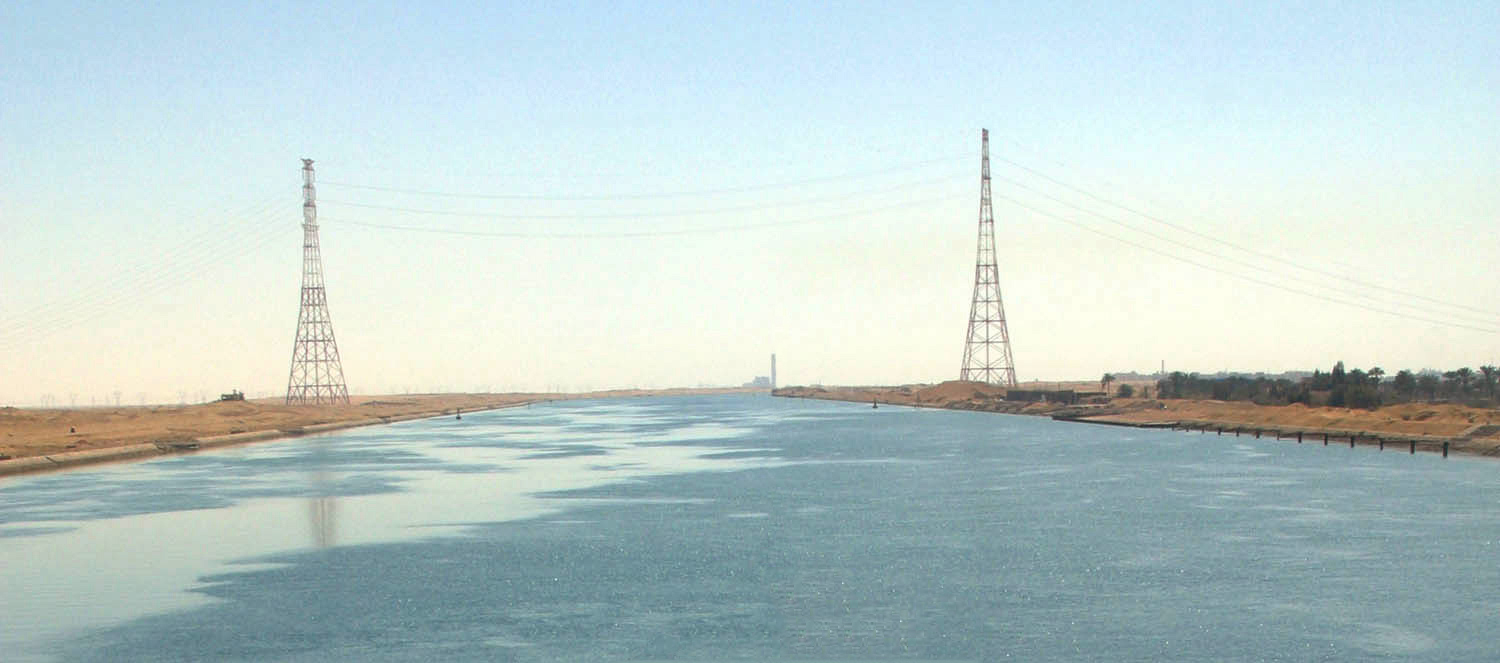
Overhead line crossing

The Suez Canal overhead powerline crossing is a major electrical power line built across the Suez Canal in 1998, located near Suez, Egypt. It is designed for two 500 kV circuits.

Because the required clearance over the Suez Canal is 152 metres (499 ft), the overhead line has two 221 metres (725 ft) high pylons (one on either side of the crossing) in spite of its small span width of 600 metres (2,000 ft). The pylons each have four crossarms: three for the conductors and one for catching the conductors in case of an insulator string failure.

== Significant developments in the region ==
The crossing was part of a major drive to develop the areas surrounding the Suez Canal, including other projects such as the Ahmed Hamdi Tunnel under the Suez Canal (completed in 1981), the El Ferdan Railway Bridge, and the Suez Canal Bridge (completed in 2001).

It was constructed by a consortium between STFA Enerkom and Siemens.

== See also ==
- Electric power transmission
- List of towers

Records
Preceded by Cairo Tower	Tallest structure in Egypt; 221 m (725 ft); 1998 – 2021	Succeeded by Iconic Tower
