= Ahmed Hamdi =

Egyptian engineer and sport shooter

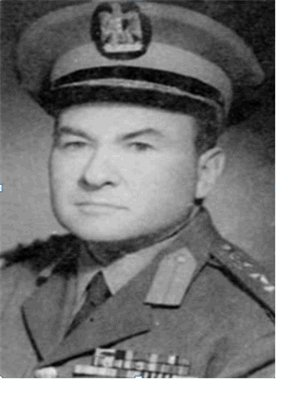

Personal information
- Born: 20 May 1929 Mansoura, Egypt
- Died: 14 October 1973 (aged 44) Suez Canal, Egypt

Sport
- Sport: Sports shooting
Medal record
Mediterranean Games
Gold medal – first place	1951 Alexandria	free rifle, 300 m
Gold medal – first place	1951 Alexandria	small-borne rifle, 50 m

Ahmed Hamdi (Arabic: أحمد حمدي; 20 May 1929 – 14 October 1973) was an Egyptian engineer and a general of the 3rd Army of Egypt during the Yom Kippur War. He was killed while crossing the Suez Canal with his soldiers and was awarded the Sinai star posthumously.

== Biography ==
Hamdi was a graduate of the Faculty of Engineering at Cairo University. In 1951 he joined the Egyptian Air Force, transferring to the engineering force in 1954. Hamdi travelled to the Soviet Union, where he passed a training for leaders at the M. V. Frunze Military Academy. In the Suez Crisis of 1956 he was known as "the pure hand" because he disarmed thousands of landmines. In 1967, he ordered blowing up the El Ferdan Railway Bridge to prevent Israeli soldiers from using it. He also installed watchtowers on the western bank of the Suez Canal beneath trees in order to watch Israeli troops' movements when there were no means or sand hills, having chosen the location of the towers himself.

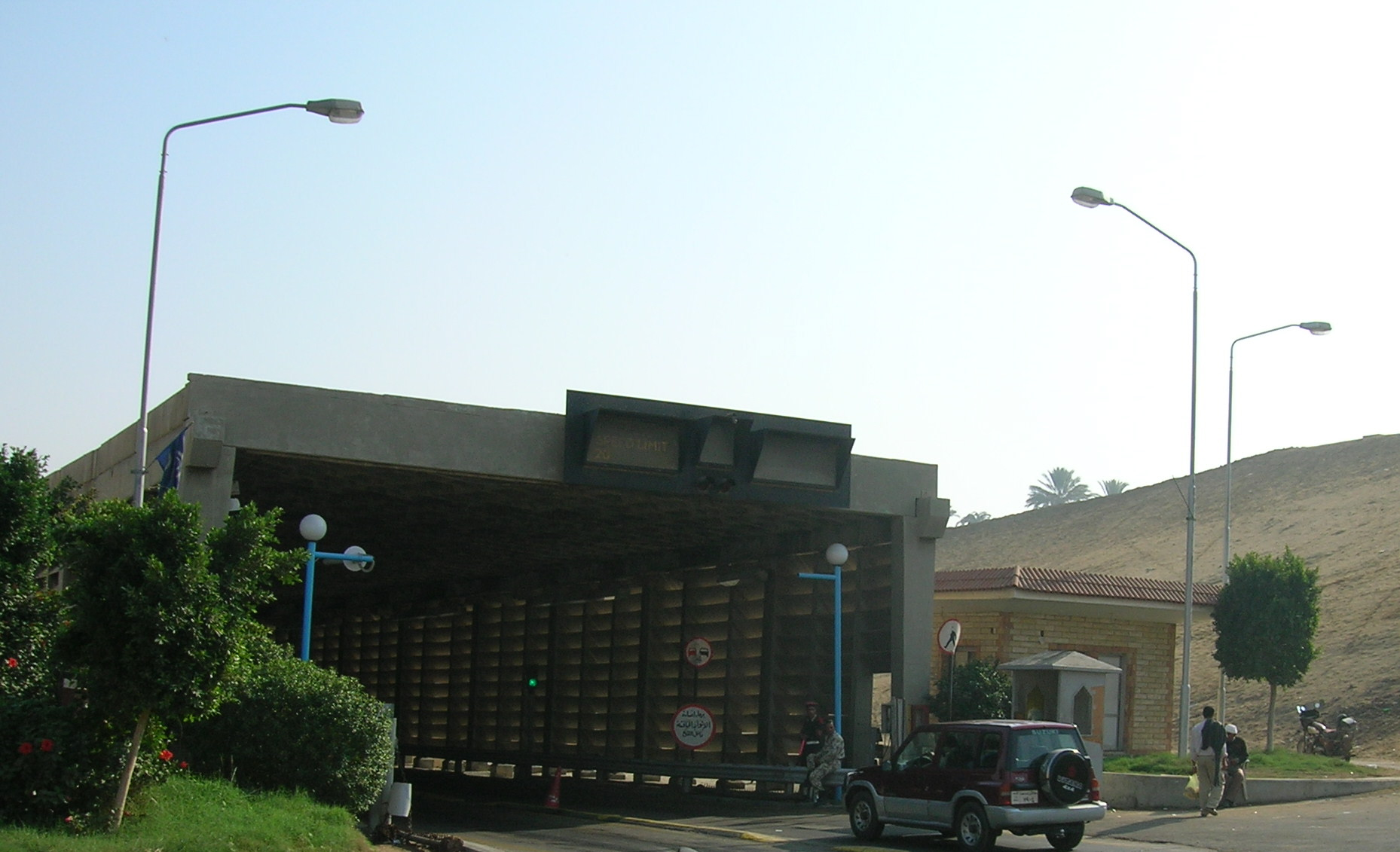
West entry of Ahmed Hamdi-Tunnel which undergoes the Suez Canal (Egypt)

In 1971, he was in charge of the preparation of a group of soldiers who had to install a bridge which would assure the safe crossing of the 3rd Army over the Suez Canal. He was the leader of the engineering group that was in charge of the engineering works of the 3rd Army, which was then the most important group fighting in the Yom Kippur War. He also helped in the adaption of Soviet production bridges to the Suez Canal situation. He shortened the Russian bridge deployment method from 12 hours to 4 hours.

He was wounded while the Egyptian army was crossing the canal on one of his bridges. He was later shot and killed during the same operation, having refused to remain in the command center with other generals in order to be with his officers and soldiers.

Egypt honored him by dedicating to his name the Sinai Star (first rank), which is the prize is the highest military award in Egypt. His death day was made the holiday of Engineer Day. President Mohamed Anwar El-Sadat named a tunnel that links Sinai to the rest of Egypt after him, the Ahmed Hamdi Tunnel.

Hamdi was also an international sport shooter for Egypt. He competed in three events at the 1952 Summer Olympics and won two gold medals at the 1951 Mediterranean Games.
