= Superjet Lines =

Egyptian bus operator

- Native name: شركة الاتحاد العربي للنقل البري
- Company type: State-owned enterprise
- Industry: Road transport by buses
- Founded: 1974; 52 years ago
- Headquarters: Cairo, Egypt
- Area served: Egypt
- Key people: Sabri Ayoub (CEO and chairman)
- Owner: Ministry of Transportation
- Website: www.superjet.com.eg

Superjet Lines (formally Arab Union for Land Transport Company) is a large common carrier of passengers by bus in Egypt and a number of Arab countries. It is fully owned by the Ministry of Transport. The main station in Cairo is in Almaza, Heliopolis, close to Cairo Airport.

== Gallery ==
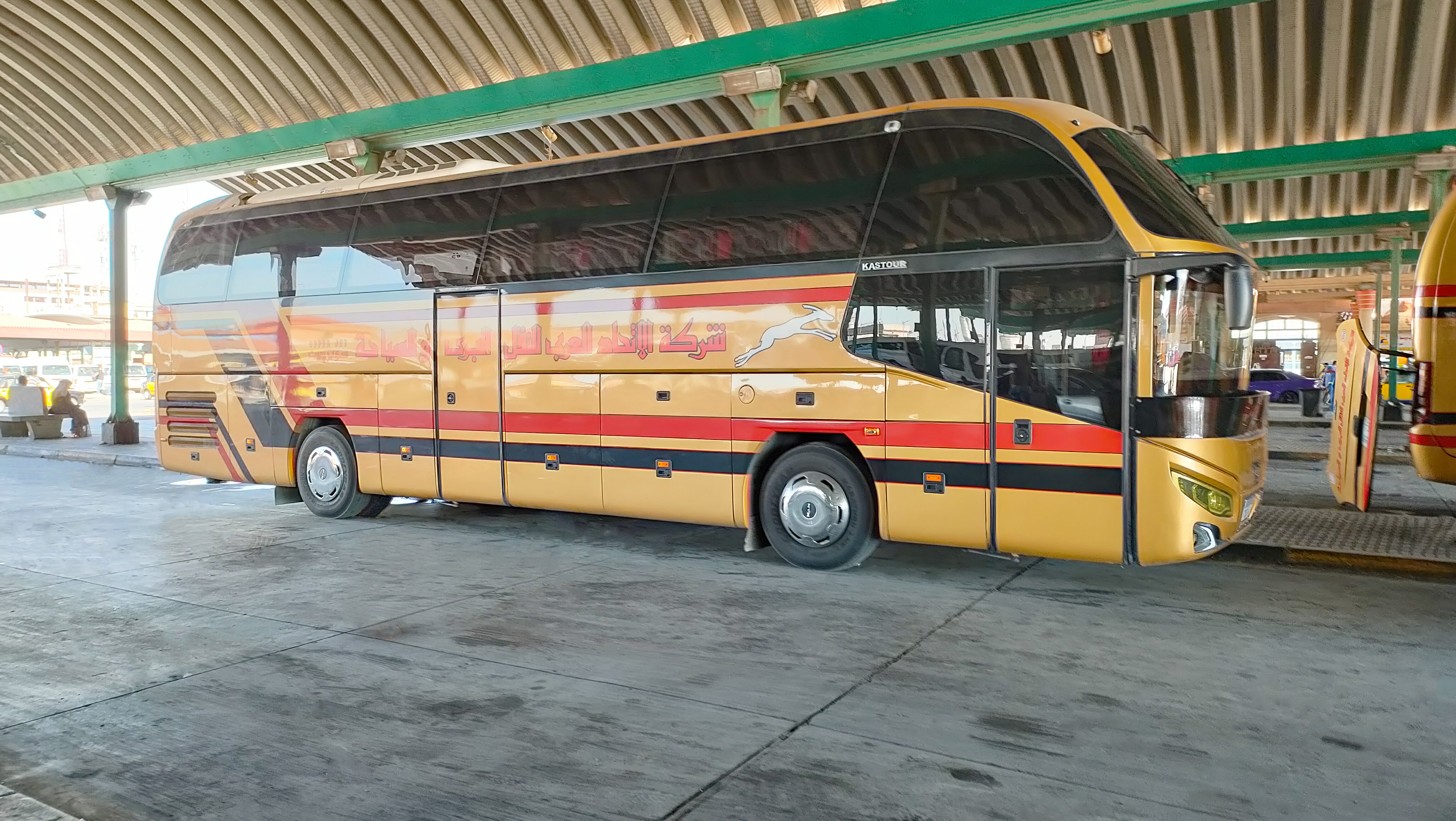
MAN bus

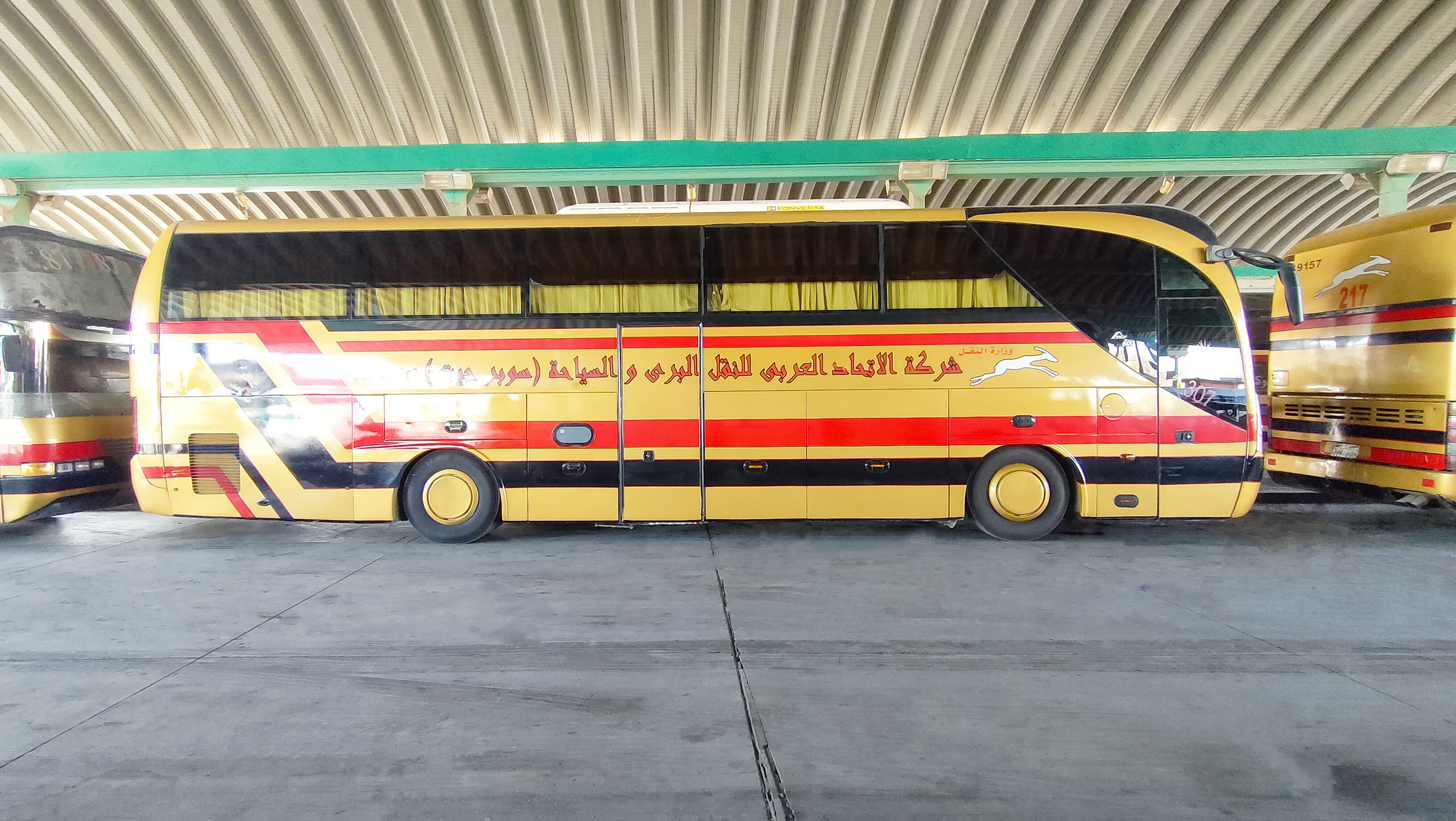
Mercedes-Benz bus

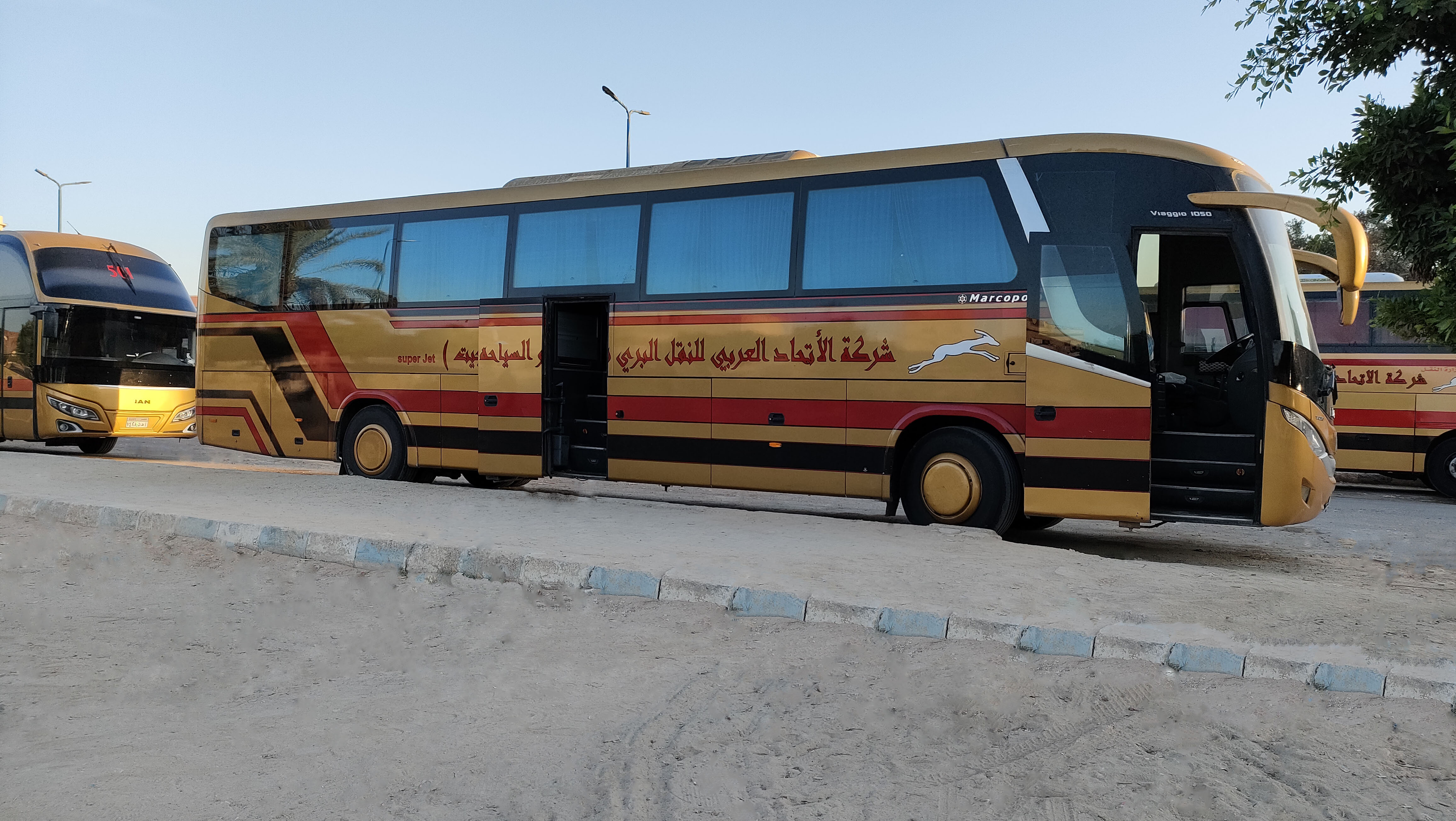
Marcopolo bus

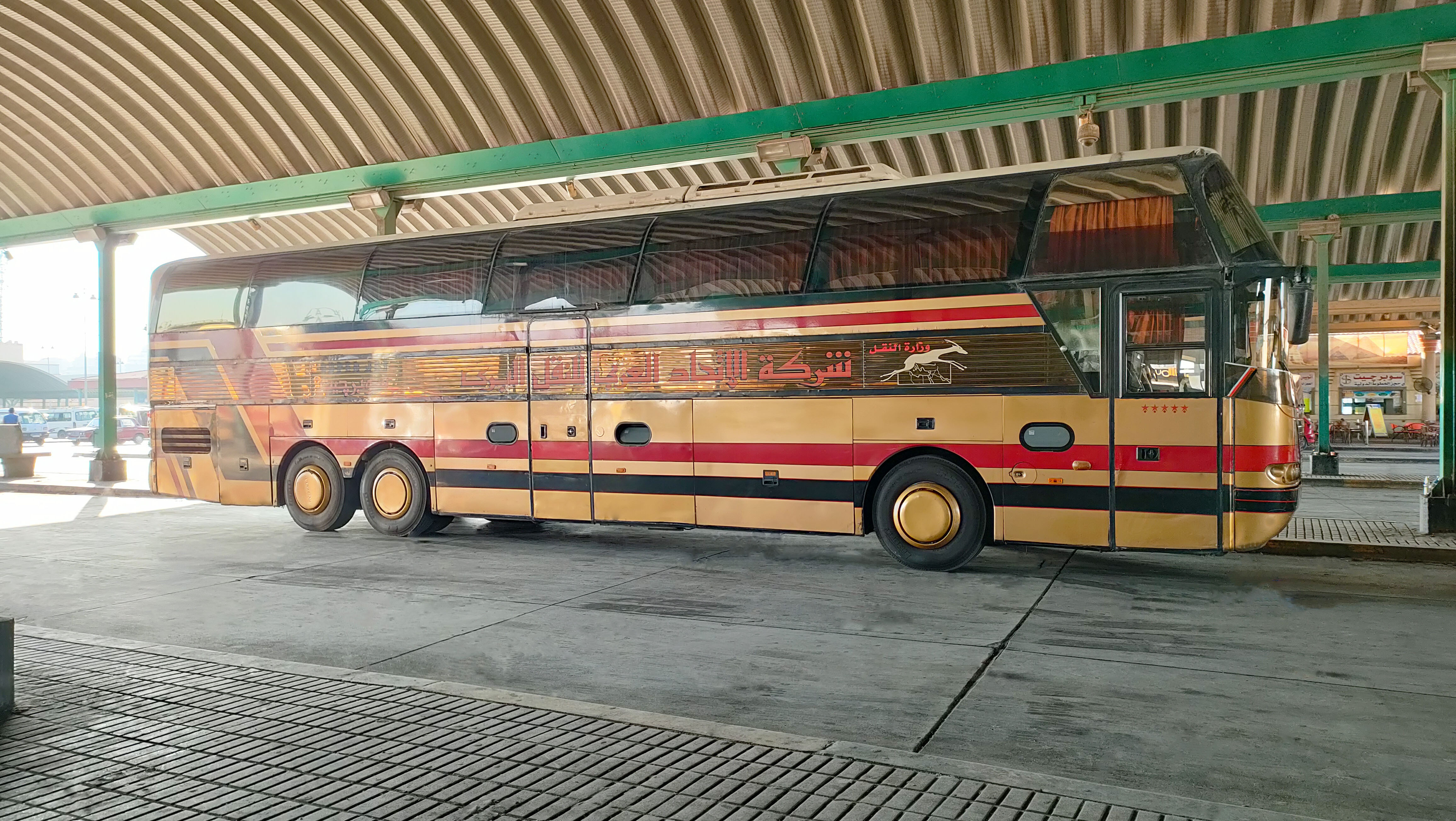
Neoplan bus

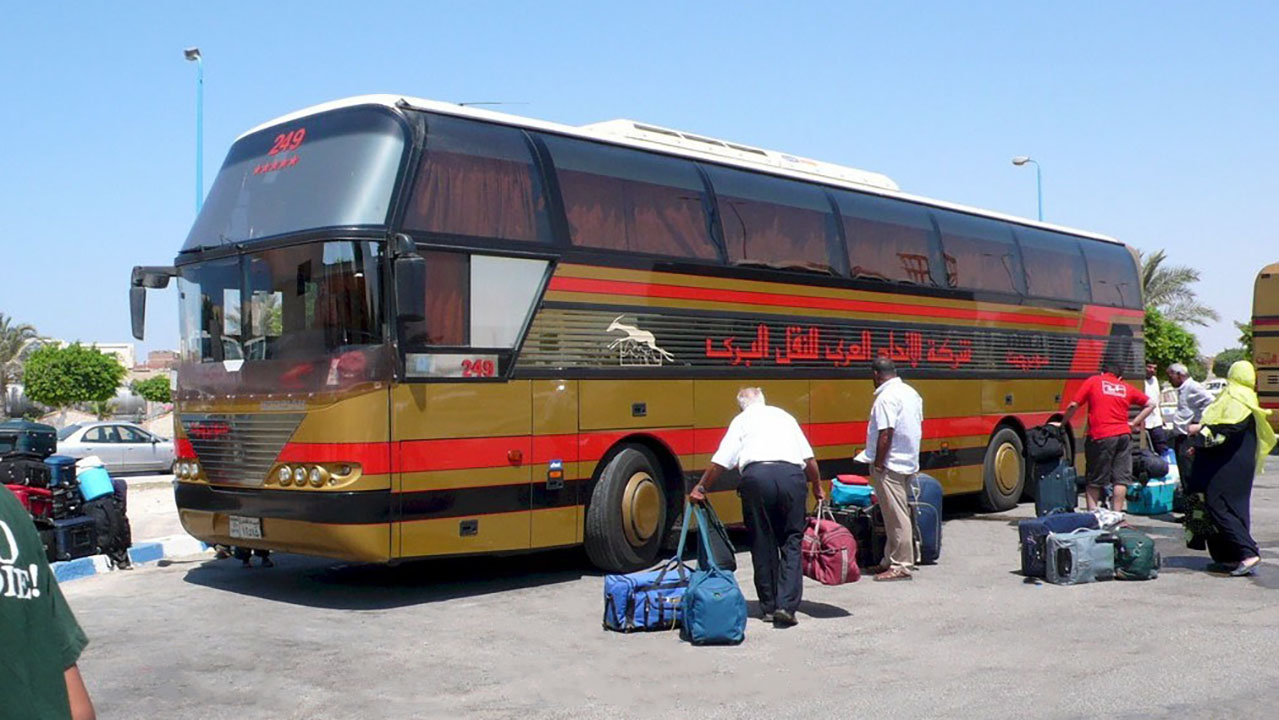
Neoplan bus

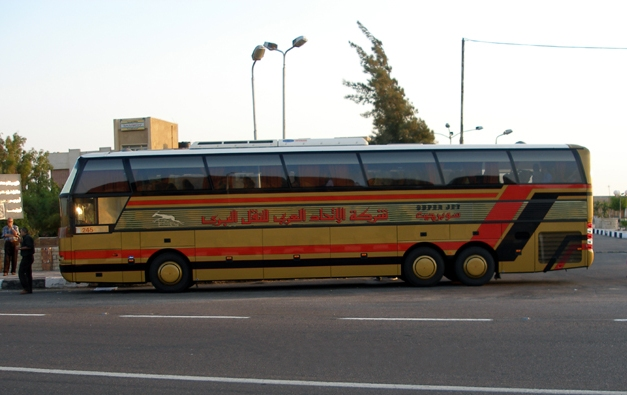
Neoplan bus

== See also ==
- Transport in Egypt
- Economy of Egypt
