= Hisham Arafat =

Egyptian politician (1964/1965–2024)

- هشام عرفات
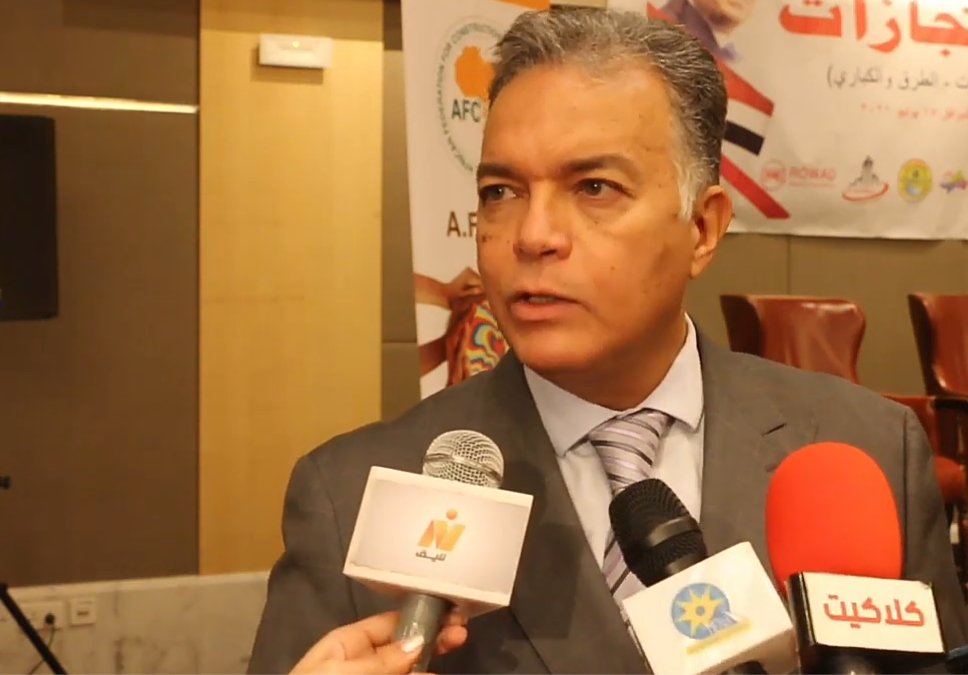
- Arafat in 2021

Minister of Transport
- In office 16 February 2017 – 27 February 2019
- President: Abdel Fattah el-Sisi
- Prime Minister: Sherif Ismail; Mostafa Madbouly
- Preceded by: Galal Saeed
- Succeeded by: Kamel al-Wazir

Personal details
- Born: 1964/1965 United Arab Republic
- Died: 15 May 2024 (aged 60)
- Education: Ain Shams University

Hisham Arafat (Arabic: هشام عرفات; 1964/1965 – 15 May 2024) was an Egyptian politician who was Transport Minister in the cabinet headed by Sherif Ismail from 19 February 2017 to 27 February 2019 (in succession to Minister Galal Saeed) and resigned shortly after the Ramses Station rail disaster.

== Qualifications ==
Hisham held the following degrees:

- Bachelor of Engineering from Ain Shams University in 1985.
- Master's degree from the same university in 1991
- Doctor's Degree from Ain Shams University and the Technical University of Braunschweig in Germany.

== Personal life and death ==
Arafat was married to an engineer who works in the private sector. They have two sons who graduated from the German University – the first from the Department of Electrical and Communications, and the second is a mechanic.

Arafat died from cancer on 15 May 2024, at the age of 60.
