= Ministry of Industry, Trade and Small Industries =

Government ministry of Egypt

Coordinates: 30°2′31″N 31°13′57″E

Arab Republic of Egypt Ministry of Trade and Industry
- وزارة التجارة والصناعة
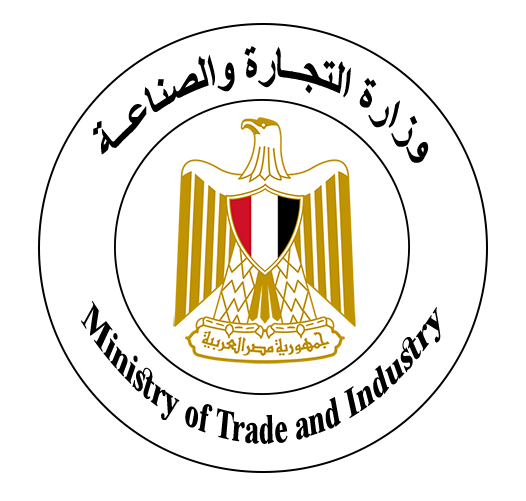

Agency overview
- Jurisdiction: Government of Egypt
- Headquarters: Garden City, Cairo
- Agency executive: Khalid Hashim, Minister
- Website: Official website

The Ministry of Trade and Industry is a cabinet level department in the government of Egypt. Its headquarters are located in Cairo. The position of minister has been held by Khalid Hashim since 11 February 026.

== Former ministers ==
- Dr. Mustafa El-Rifai
- Samir El-Sayiad
- Hatem Saleh
- Mounir Fakhry Abdel Nour
- Tareq Qabil
- Nevine Gamea
- Ahmed Samir
- Kamel al-Wazir

== See also ==
- Cabinet of Egypt
