= Ahmed Hamdi Tunnel =

Car tunnel in Egypt

Coordinates: 30°5′33″N 32°34′16″E

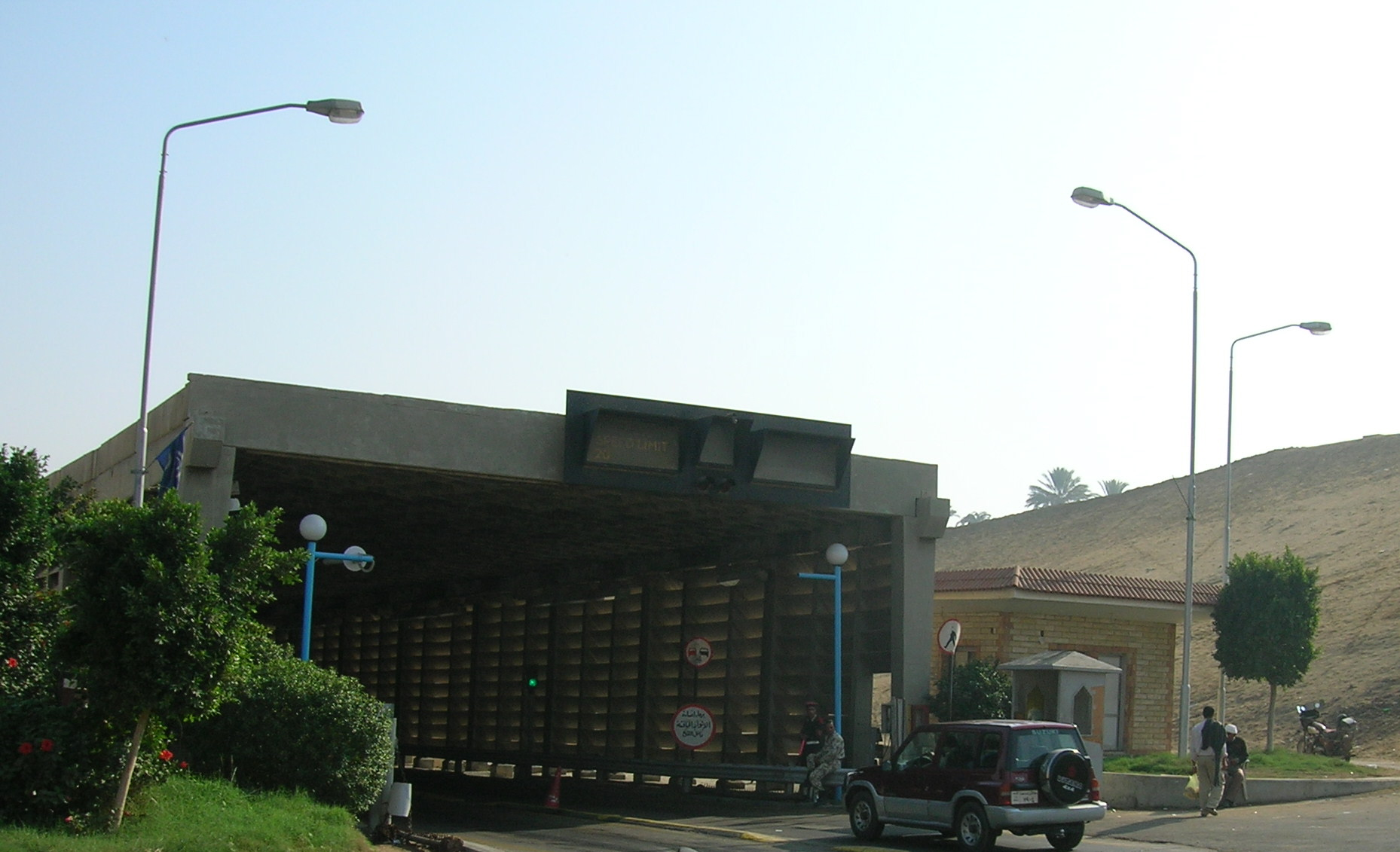
- West entry to the Ahmed Hamdi Tunnel
- Interactive map of Ahmed Hamdi Tunnel

Overview
- Location: Suez Canal
- Start: Sinai Peninsula
- End: Suez

Operation
- Constructed: Tarmac Construction
- Opened: 1981
- Reopened: 1992

Technical
- Length: 1.63 km (1.01 mi)
- No. of lanes: 2

Location of Ahmed Hamdi Tunnel

The Ahmed Hamdi Tunnel is a 1.63-kilometre-long (1.01 mi) car tunnel under the Suez Canal at Shallufa. The tunnel is named after Ahmed Hamdi, an Egyptian engineer and general martyred in action during the October war. It has two lanes of traffic, one in each direction, and it connects the Asian Sinai Peninsula to the town of Suez on the African mainland.

== Construction ==
It was originally constructed as a shield tunnel by Tarmac Construction in November 1981. In 1992, the Japanese government granted aid to a project aimed at rehabilitating the tunnel which had developed leaks. It is 1.63 kilometres (1.01 mi) long and has an outside diameter of 11.6 metres (38 ft). The tunnel reaches a maximum depth of 51 metres (167 ft) below ground level.

== Significant developments in the region ==
The tunnel was part of a major drive to develop the areas surrounding the Suez Canal, including other projects such as the Suez Canal overhead line crossing (completed in 1998), the El Ferdan Railway Bridge, and the Suez Canal Bridge (completed in 2001).

== See also ==
- Trans-African Highway network
