= Samir El-Sayiad =

Minister of Industry and Foreign Trade of Egypt

Minister of Industry and Foreign Trade
- Incumbent
- Assumed office 2011
- President: Mohamed Tantawi (Acting)
- Prime Minister: Essam Sharaf
- Preceded by: Rachid Mohamed Rachid

Samir El-Sayiad (also Samir Sayad) is the Minister of Industry and Foreign Trade for Egypt, serving since 2011.

== Career ==
Full Professor of Industrial Chemistry and former Dean of the Faculty of Science, Helwan University.

The Cultural Counselor and director of the Egyptian Educational Bureau to the United Kingdom and Ireland.

International expert in industrial development and export promotion at the United Nations Industrial Development Organization (UNIDO), and the (UNCTAD) since 1977, in which missions have been accomplished in many countries in Latin America, Europe, Africa, Asia and India.

Chairman and CEO of one of the largest firms for Chemical Industry.

Member of the Industry branch and the Higher Education Branch of the Supreme Specialized Councils.

Former member of the Industry Research Council, secretary of the Chemical Industry Committee, member of the Marketing Research Committee and head of the Printing and Packaging Committee, at the Academy of Scientific Research and Technology.

Former member of the Supreme Committee for granting the Egyptian Industry excellence awards at the Industrial Modernization Centre.

== See also ==
- Cabinet of Egypt

Political offices
Preceded by Rachid Mohamed Rachid	Minister of Industry and Foreign Trade; Mar, 2011-Jul ,2011	Incumbent
