= Galal Saeed =

Egyptian engineer

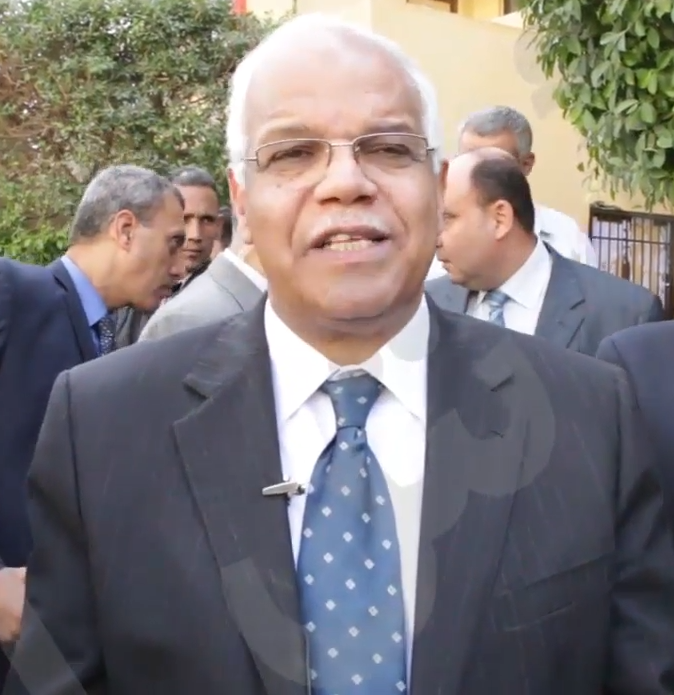
- Galal Saeed

Minister of Transport
- In office 7 December 2011 – 2 August 2012
- Prime Minister: Kamal Ganzouri
- Preceded by: Ali Zain al-Abidin Salem Haikal
- Succeeded by: Mohammad Rashad Al Matini
- In office 23 March 2016 – 16 February 2017
- Prime Minister: Sherif Ismail
- Preceded by: Saad el Geyoushi
- Succeeded by: Hisham Arafat

Governor of Cairo
- In office 13 August 2013 – 23 March 2016
- Preceded by: Osama Kamal
- Succeeded by: Atef Abdelhamid

Personal details
- Party: Independent
- Education: Cairo University; McMaster University; Waterloo University

Galal Mostafa Mohamed Saeed (Arabic: جلال مصطفى محمد سعيد) is an Egyptian engineer and politician. He was the Minister of Transport of Egypt in two occasions, initially from 2011 to 2012 and later from 2016 to 2017. He also served as Governor of Cairo from 2013 to 2016.

== Early life and education ==
Dr. Galal Saeed graduated as a civil engineer in 1971 from the Faculty of Engineering, Cairo University. He received a master's degree from the same university before he traveled to Canada to complete his postgraduate studies. In Canada, he earned a master's degree in the field of transportation and traffic engineering from McMaster University in Canada. In 1979, he received a doctorate from the University of Waterloo in Canada in the field of strategic planning for transportation. Dr. Galal Saeed began his career as a teaching assistant before getting a doctorate and becoming a professor. He studied and lectured in many universities like Waterloo, Cairo University and Kuwait University.

== Career ==
- Dean of the Faculty of Engineering from 1992 to 2001, Cairo University
- President of Fayoum University
- Governor of Fayoum
- Minister of Transportation during the Cabinet of Kamal Ganzouri (was a candidate for the same post in Hazem El-Beblawi's government)
