= Ministry of Transportation (Egypt) =

Government ministry of Egypt

Arab Republic of Egypt Ministry of Transportation
- وزارة النقل
- Emblem of Egypt

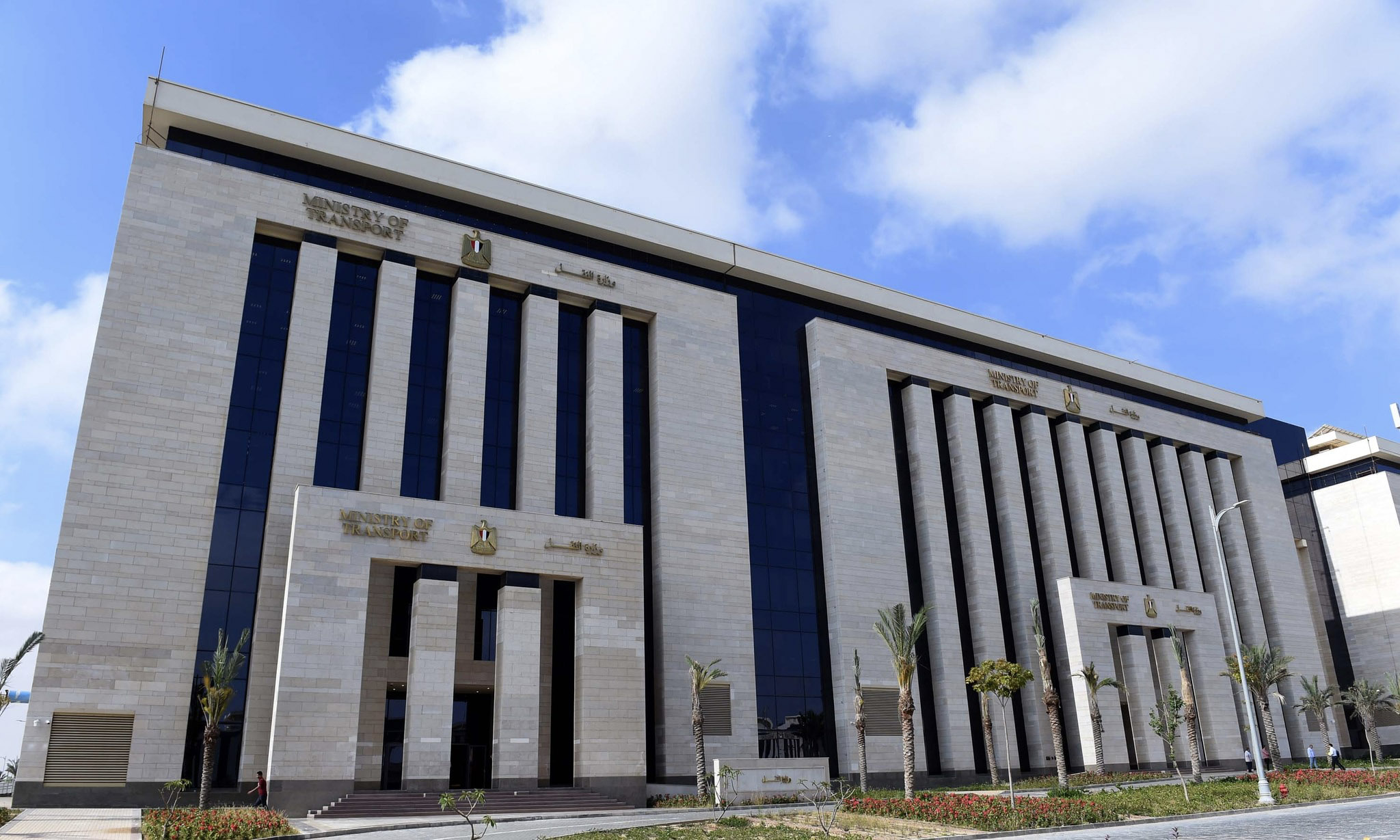
- The Ministry building in The New Capital

Agency overview
- Jurisdiction: Government of Egypt
- Headquarters: New Capital, Cairo Governorate
- Agency executive: Kamel al-Wazir, Acting Minister
- Website: Official website

The Ministry of Transportation (MOT) of Egypt is the part of the Cabinet of Egypt concerned with transportation. It is responsible for meeting the transportation needs of the country, whether by sea, land or air, and is aligned with Egyptian national development plans. It is governed by the Minister of Transportation.

== Objectives ==
Some of the ministries tasks follow.

- Development of facilities and the promotion of maritime transport, including global development in the shipping industry
- Modernize and develop the network of existing roads to provide greater comfort, capacity and safety, and also to expand this network to meet future needs for development.
- Development of inland waterways of the river transport service and provide the highest levels of security.
- Making plans for the establishment and development and strengthening of railway networks on the national level
- Develop plans to establish subway networks (Cairo Metro).
- Work on the development of land ports and enhancing their performance.
- Develop plans to ensure the provision of specialized labor in the area of the ministry's activities.
- Activate the studies and research in the field of work of the ministry.

President Abdel Fattah el-Sisi set ambitious goals for the Ministry of Transportation, when he took office in 2014 and by June 2018, the Ministry of Transportation had reported several achievements.

== Ministers ==
Minister	Term start	Term end	Comments	Refs
Hamdi Abdel-Salam El-Shayeb	11 March 2002	1 May 2004	Died in office	
Essam Sharaf	12 July 2004	15 February 2005		
Mohamed Lotfi Mansour	15 February 2005	October 2009		
Alaa El Din Mohamed Fahmy	3 January 2010	29 January 2011		
Atef Abdel-Hamid Mostafa	29 January 2011	21 July 2011		
Ali Zain al-Abidin Salem Haikal	21 July 2011	21 November 2011		
Galal Moustafa Mohamed Saeed	7 December 2011	2 August 2012		
Mohamed Rashad al-Matini	2 August 2012	17 November 2012		
Hatem Abdel Latif	5 January 2013	4 July 2013	Ends at the 2013 Egyptian coup d'état	
Dr. Ibrahim El-Demiri	2013			
Saad el Geyoushi	September 2015			
Galal Saeed	23 March 2016	16 February 2017		
Hisham Arafat	16 February 2017	27 February 2019		
Kamel al-Wazir	March 2019			

== Affiliated bodies ==
The ministry is affiliated with a variety of bodies including:

- The General Authority for planning transportation projects
- National Authority for Railways
- National Authority for Tunnels.
- General Authority for Roads, Bridges and Land Transport
- River Transportation Authority
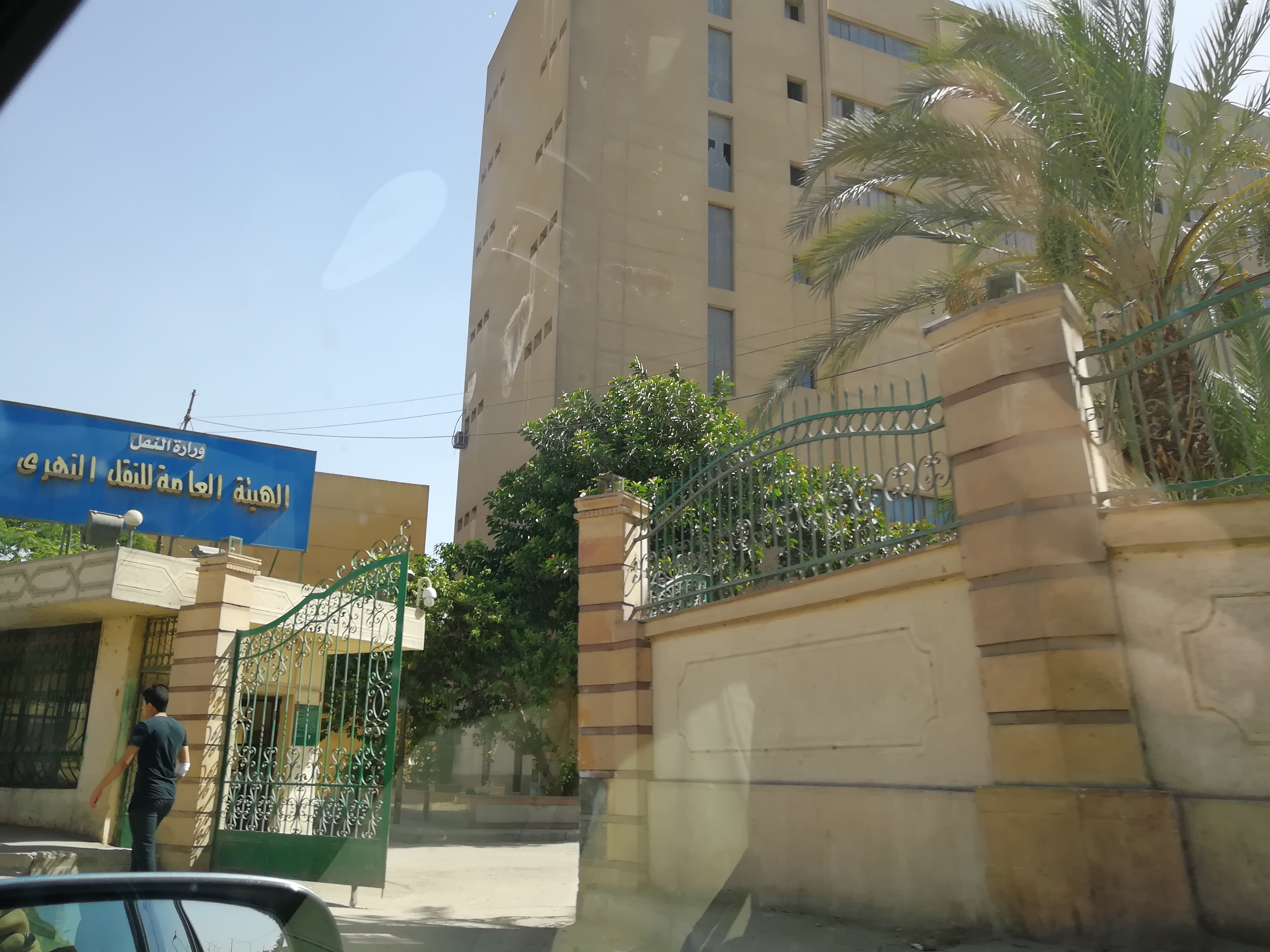
  River Transportation Authority
- The General Authority for Land Ports and dry
- National Institute of Transport
- The General Authority for Alexandria Port
- General Authority of Red Sea Ports
- General Authority for Port Said Ports
- Damietta Port Authority
- Maritime Transport Sector
- General Authority for Maritime Safety
- Subway Operating System
- Super Jet
- Maritime Data Bank of Egypt

== Roads and bridges ==
The Ministry's goals are to provide a road network meeting international standards and ensure competitive service in the transport of passengers and goods and a high degree of speed and security. MOT's goals are also to create a mass transit system developed and integrated between the provinces, while encouraging the private sector.

In June 2018, the Ministry of Transportation reported that 11 roads with a total length of 865 km had been constructed. New roads had been constructed and others had been doubled or lengthened.

== Railway projects ==
The MOT's goals are to focus on the development of the system of transporting goods and passengers through the modernization of the fleet of tractors and wagons by importing from abroad as well as the modernization of signaling systems and track maintenance.

In October, 2018 a contract was signed between Russia, Holland and Egypt for, among other things, the modernization of Egypt's railways. Negotiations had been in the works, at least since January 2018, with representatives from dozens of Russian companies visiting Egypt to discuss multiple construction projects. The contract speaks of a $7 billion investment.

== Subway projects ==
One of the goals are to develop the system of tunnels and complete the establishment of the remaining stages of the third and fourth line. In June 2018, the Ministry of Transportation reported on the phases that were completed and were still ongoing on the subway third and fourth lines. A new electric train line for the new administrative capital of Egypt had been implemented. Improvements and modernization included supplying air-conditioned trains, building escalators and electric elevators at metro stations and supplying new gates and ticket machines for the existing first and second metro lines and stations.

== Maritime transport ==
The long-term goals are to activate and expand the Egyptian ports to increase capacity available for carriage of exported and imported goods and passenger transfer and to create new ports and develop the Egyptian Maritime Fleet. The objective is to build on the advantage of Egypt's geographical location to connect transportation between East and West, North and South.

=== Red Sea ports ===
In June 2018, the Ministry of Transportation reported that the construction of new passenger terminals had been completed at Safaga port, Hurghada port, and Nuweiba Port. A waiting station had been constructed at the Hurghada port.

=== Alexandria and Dekheila ports ===
In June 2018, the Ministry of Transportation reported that the shipping corridor's depth was increased to 15.5 meters and renovations were made to a bridge.

=== Port Damietta ===
In June 2018, as part Egypt's national plans to improve the ports, engineers improved the shipping corridor, constructed new berths for general merchandise and for maritime service, and constructed and supplied 4 marine locomotives.

== Dry ports ==
Port Qustal was established for trade between Egypt and Sudan East of the Nile. A new hub was constructed in Arqeen for Egypt and Sudan West of the Nile.

== River transport ==
Two river ports will be constructed; one in Qena and the other in Sohag Governorate, and the foundation stones were laid in April 2018 and May 2018, respectively.

== See also ==
- Cabinet of Egypt
