= El Ferdan Railway Bridge =

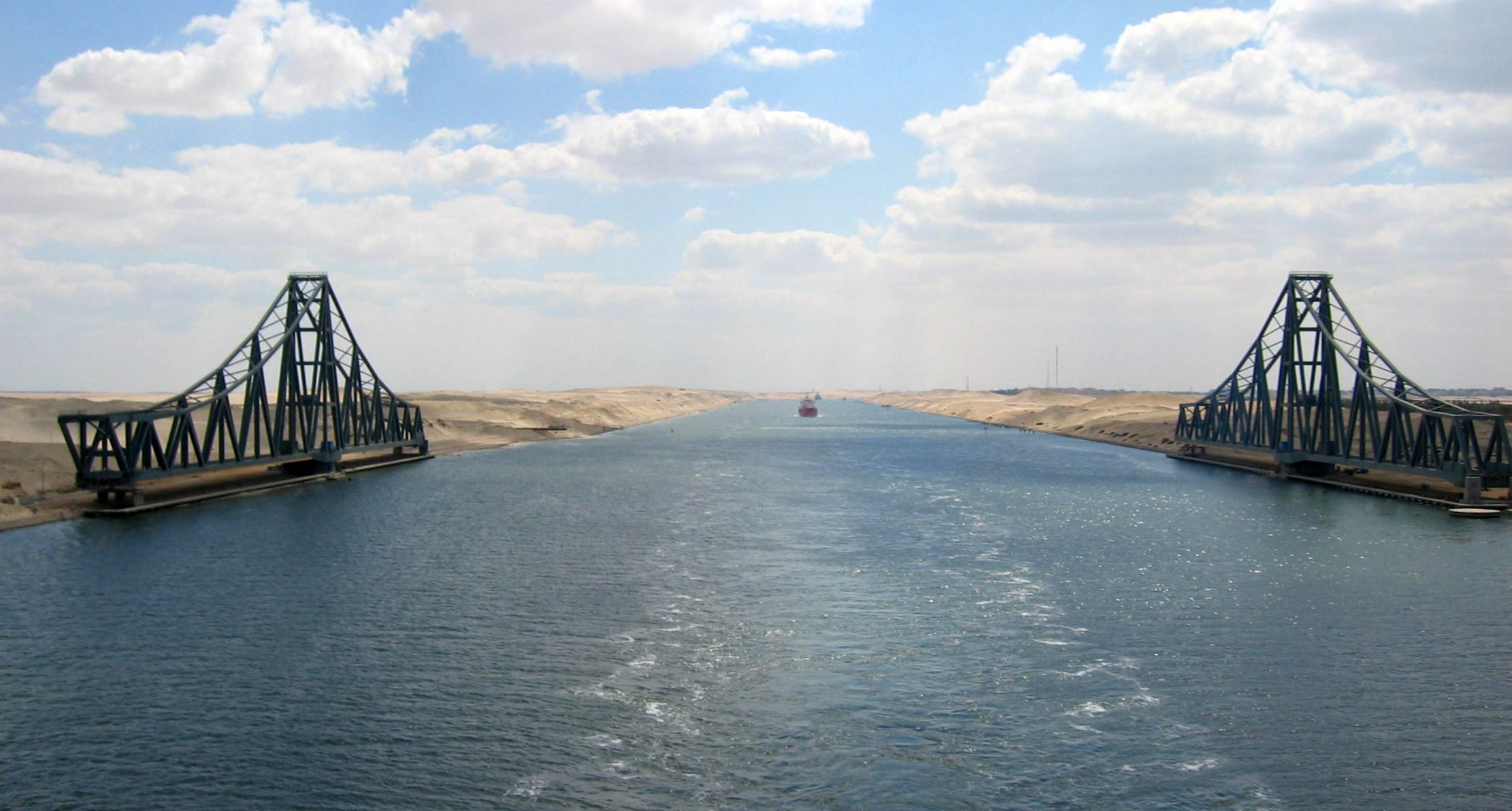
- El Ferdan Railway Bridge, the longest swing bridge in the world, runs from the west of the Suez Canal to the east into Sinai, opens most of the time to allow sailing ships to pass in the canal, and closes during passage of trains
- Coordinates: 30°39′25″N 32°20′02″E
- Carries: 2 rail lines
- Crosses: Suez Canal
- Locale: Egypt

Characteristics
- Design: Cantilever Bridge with a swing span
- Material: Steel
- Width: 12.6 m (41 ft)
- Longest span: 1,100 feet (340 m)
- No. of spans: 8

History
- Constructed by: Krupp
- Construction cost: $80 million
- Opened: 2001; 25 years ago

Location
- Interactive map of El Ferdan Railway Bridge

The El Ferdan Railway Bridge is a swing bridge that spans the western shipping lane of the Suez Canal near Ismailia, Egypt. It is the longest swing bridge in the world, with a span of 1,100 feet (340 m).

The bridge was not functional for a while due to the expansion of the Suez Canal completed in 2015 which added a parallel shipping lane just east of the existing bridge, cutting off the railway into Sinai. As of 2021, a second swing bridge spanning the new eastern shipping lane was under construction and started operating in 2024.

== History ==
The first El Ferdan Railway Bridge over the Suez Canal was completed in April 1918 for the Sinai Military Railway. It was considered a hindrance to shipping so after the First World War it was removed. A steel swing bridge was built in 1942 (during the Second World War), but this was damaged by a steamship and removed in 1947. A double swing bridge was completed in 1954 but the 1956 Anglo-Franco-Israeli war with Egypt severed rail traffic across the canal for a third time. A replacement bridge was completed in 1963 which was destroyed in 1967 in the Six-Day War by the Egyptian engineering General Ahmed Hamdy.

In July 1996, a consortium led by German Krupp was awarded a $US70 million contract to design and build the bridge, raised to $80 million to increase the main span from 320 to 340 m (1,050 to 1,120 ft). The current bridge was constructed in 2001.

== Significant developments in the region ==
The El Ferdan Railway Bridge was part of a major drive to develop the areas surrounding the Suez Canal, including other projects such as the Ahmed Hamdi Tunnel under the Suez Canal (completed in 1983), the Suez Canal overhead powerline crossing, and the Suez Canal Bridge (completed in 2001, roughly 12 miles north of the El Ferdan Railway Bridge).

== The bridge today: plans for upgrading tracks and building a new bridge ==
The parallel New Suez Canal was excavated in 2014/2015 a short distance to the east but without a bridge spanning it. Without a second bridge, the railway across El Ferdan bridge is a dead end.

Initially, a plan was in place to construct a new railway tunnel in the Ismailia region (and another near Port Said is planned) in order to reconnect the Sinai to the rest of Egypt's rail network. However, Kamel al-Wazir, who was at that time the head of the Egyptian Armed Forces - Engineering Corps, announced that due to high costs the plans for a new tunnel would be scrapped and that the Engineering Corps would seek other alternatives including moving the existing bridge to a narrow section of the canal at El-Qantara.

However, the final decision was made in 2017 to keep the existing bridge at its current location and build a new double-track railway bridge (based on the current El Ferdan bridge design) across the new, eastern shipping lane several hundred meters to the east. The existing bridge over the western shipping lane would be converted from a single-track railway to a double-track railway. This was near completion in October 2023.
