= Mohammad Rashad Al Matini =

Egyptian engineer and politician

Minister of Transportation
- In office 2 August 2012 – 17 November 2012
- Prime Minister: Hesham Qandil
- Preceded by: Galal Saeed
- Succeeded by: Hatem Abdel Latif

Personal details
- Party: Independent

Mohammad Rashad Al Matini is Egypt's former minister of transportation from 2 August 2012 until his resignation in the aftermath of the Manfalut railway accident on 17 November 2012.

== Career ==
Al Matini worked as a professor of civil engineering at Cairo University. He also served as a consultant at different ministries related to his field of speciality.

He was appointed minister of transportation in the Qandil cabinet on 2 August 2012, replacing Galal Saeed. It was the first governmental post of Al Matini who had no political affiliation. On 17 November 2012, a train crashed with a school bus, killing more than 40 school-age children and injuring others in Assiut governorate. Upon this event, Al Matini submitted his resignation to President Mohammad Morsi. Rashad was replaced by Hatem Abdel Latif on 5 January 2013 in a cabinet reshuffle.
