= Ahmed Samir (politician) =

Egyptian politician

- أحمد سمير

Minister of Trade and Industry
- In office August 2022 – July 2024
- President: Abdel Fattah el-Sisi
- Prime Minister: Mostafa Madbouly
- Preceded by: Nevine Gamea
- Succeeded by: Kamel al-Wazir

Personal details
- Born: 17 September 1974 (age 52) Giza Governorate, Egypt
- Party: Nation's Future Party

Ahmed Samir Saleh (Arabic: أحمد سمير; born 17 September 1974) is an Egyptian politician, and the former Minister of Trade and Industry between August 2022 and July 2024, in succession to Minister Nevine Gamea and succeeded by Kamel al-Wazir. He is Chairman of Chilean-Egyptian Parliamentary Friendship group.

== Education and career ==
Saleh holds a bachelor's degree in Mechanical Engineering (1996). He served as vice chairman of Canal for Plastic Company before joining 6 October Investment Association where is a member of the board of trustees and president of the organization. He was elected to the Egyptian parliament in 2016. In the house, he focused on economic development and sponsored several amendments to Egyptian industrial laws and played a prominent role in the passage of Unified Investment Law. He served as chairman of the House of Representative committee on Economic Affairs until his appointment as minister of Industry and Trade succeeding Nevine Gamea.
