= Suez Canal Bridge =

Road bridge crossing the Suez Canal at El Qantara

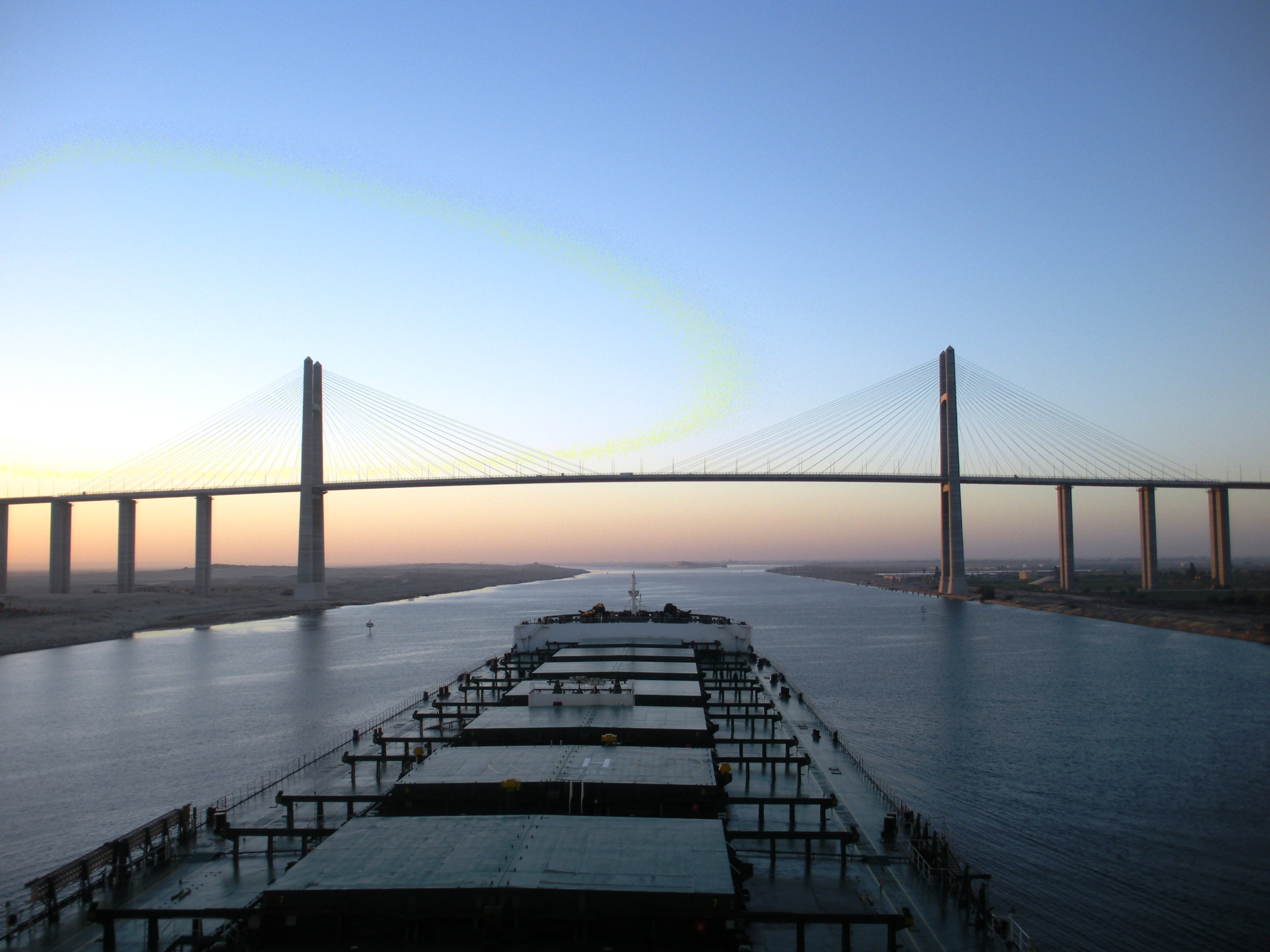
- Coordinates: 30.828248°N 32.317572°E
- Carries: Four lanes vehicular traffic
- Crosses: Suez Canal
- Locale: El Qantara, Egypt
- Owner: General Authority for Roads, Bridges & Transport; Ministry of Transport and Communication
- Maintained by: General Authority for Roads, Bridges & Transport, Ministry of Transport and Communication

Characteristics
- Design: Cable-stayed bridge semi-fan arrangement, H-pylon, hollow box
- Material: Steel and reinforced concrete
- Total length: 3.9 km (2.4 mi)
- Width: 22.8 m (75 ft)
- Height: 154 m (505 ft) (pylons)
- Longest span: 404 m (1,325 ft)
- Clearance below: 70 m (230 ft)

History
- Designer: Kajima
- Constructed by: Consortium consisting of: Kajima; JFE Holdings; Nippon Steel
- Construction start: 1995
- Opened: October 9, 2001; 25 years ago

Location
- Interactive map of Suez Canal Bridge

The Suez Canal Bridge (also known as the Suez Canal Peace Bridge or the Japan-Egypt Friendship Bridge) is a cable-stayed bridge crossing the Suez Canal at El-Qantara, whose name means "the bridge" in Egyptian Arabic. The bridge links the continents of Africa and Asia.

== Design and construction ==
The bridge was built with assistance from the Japanese government. The main contractor was Kajima Corporation.

The Japanese grant, accounting for 60% of the construction cost (or 13.5 billion yen), was agreed to during the visit of then-President Hosni Mubarak to Japan in March 1995, as part of a larger project to develop the Sinai Peninsula. Egypt bore the remaining 40% (9 billion yen). The bridge was opened in October 2001.

The bridge, which has a 70-metre (229 ft 8 in) clearance over the canal and is 3.9 kilometres (2.4 mi) long, consists of a 400-metre (1,300 ft) cable-stayed main span and two 1.8-kilometre (1.1 mi) long approach spans.

The height of the two main pylons supporting the main span is 154 metres (505 ft) each. The towers were designed in the shape of Pharaonic obelisks.

The clearance under the bridge is 70 metres (229 ft 8 in). Therefore, the maximum height of ships that can pass through the Suez Canal (Suezmax) is 68 metres (223 ft 1 in) above the waterline.

== Significant developments in the region ==
The Suez Canal Bridge was part of a major drive to develop the areas surrounding the Suez Canal, including other projects such as the Ahmed Hamdi Tunnel under the Suez Canal (completed in 1981), the El Ferdan Railway Bridge, and the Suez Canal overhead powerline crossing.

== Gallery ==
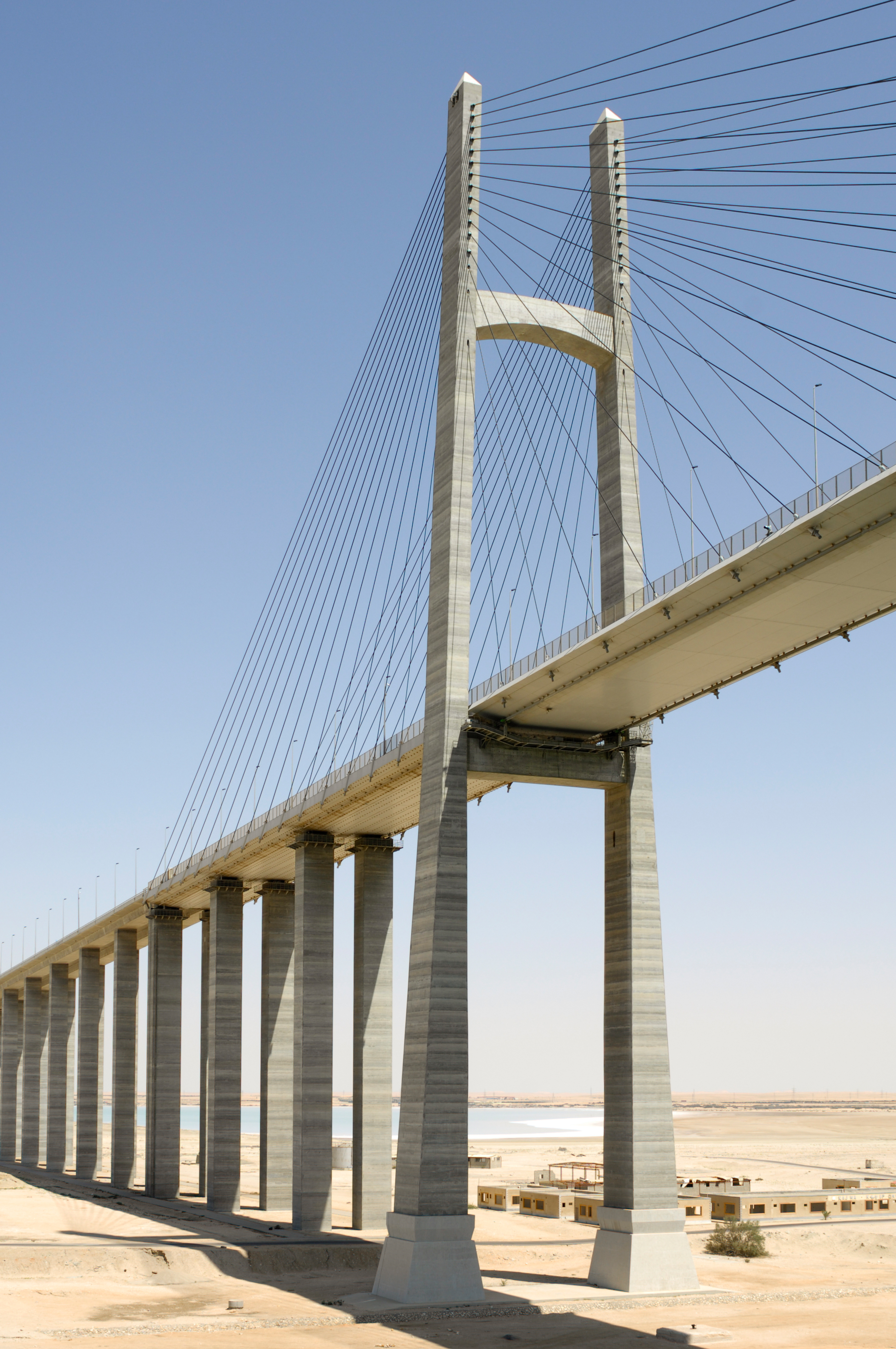
Detail view of one of the main pylons

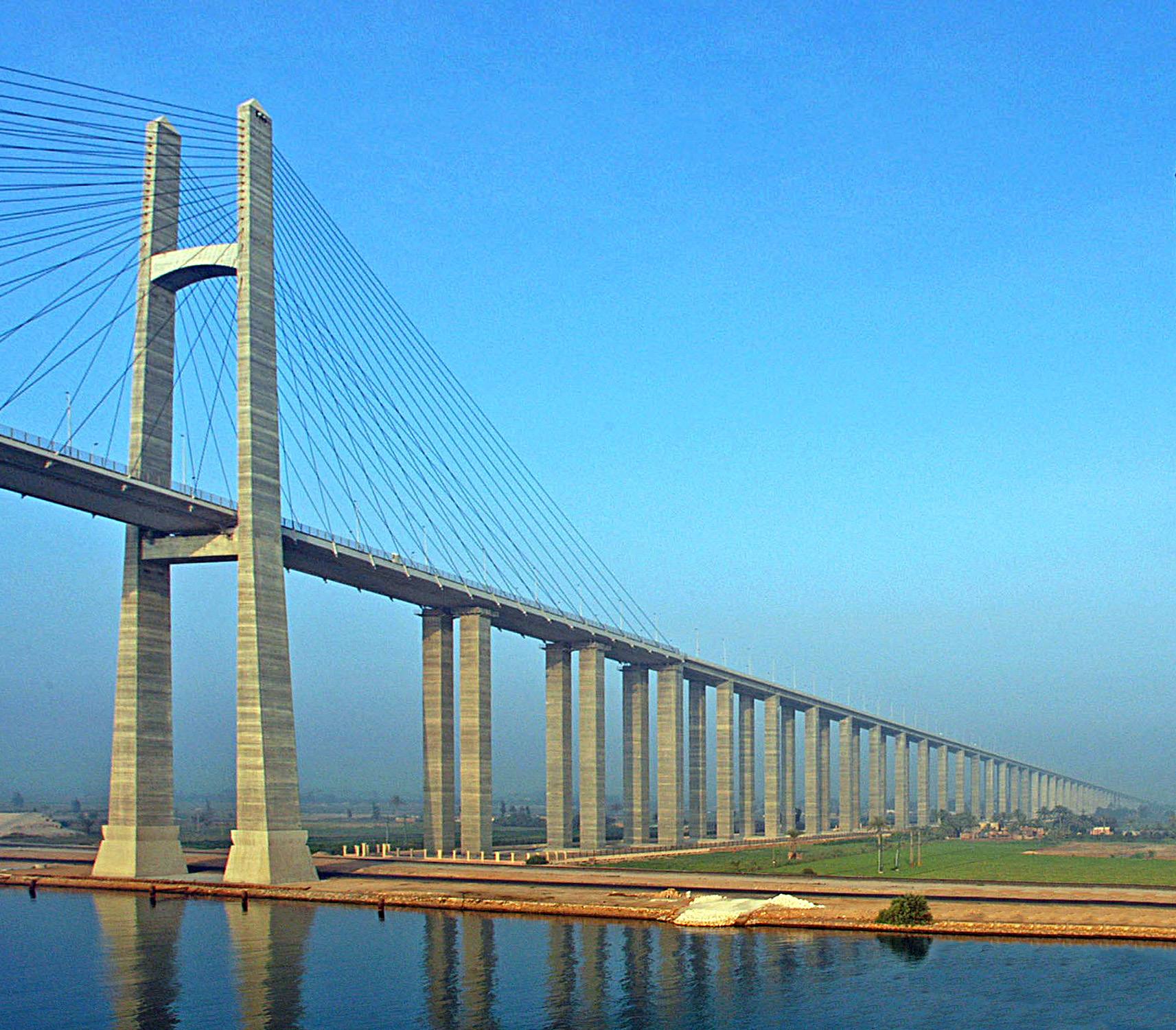

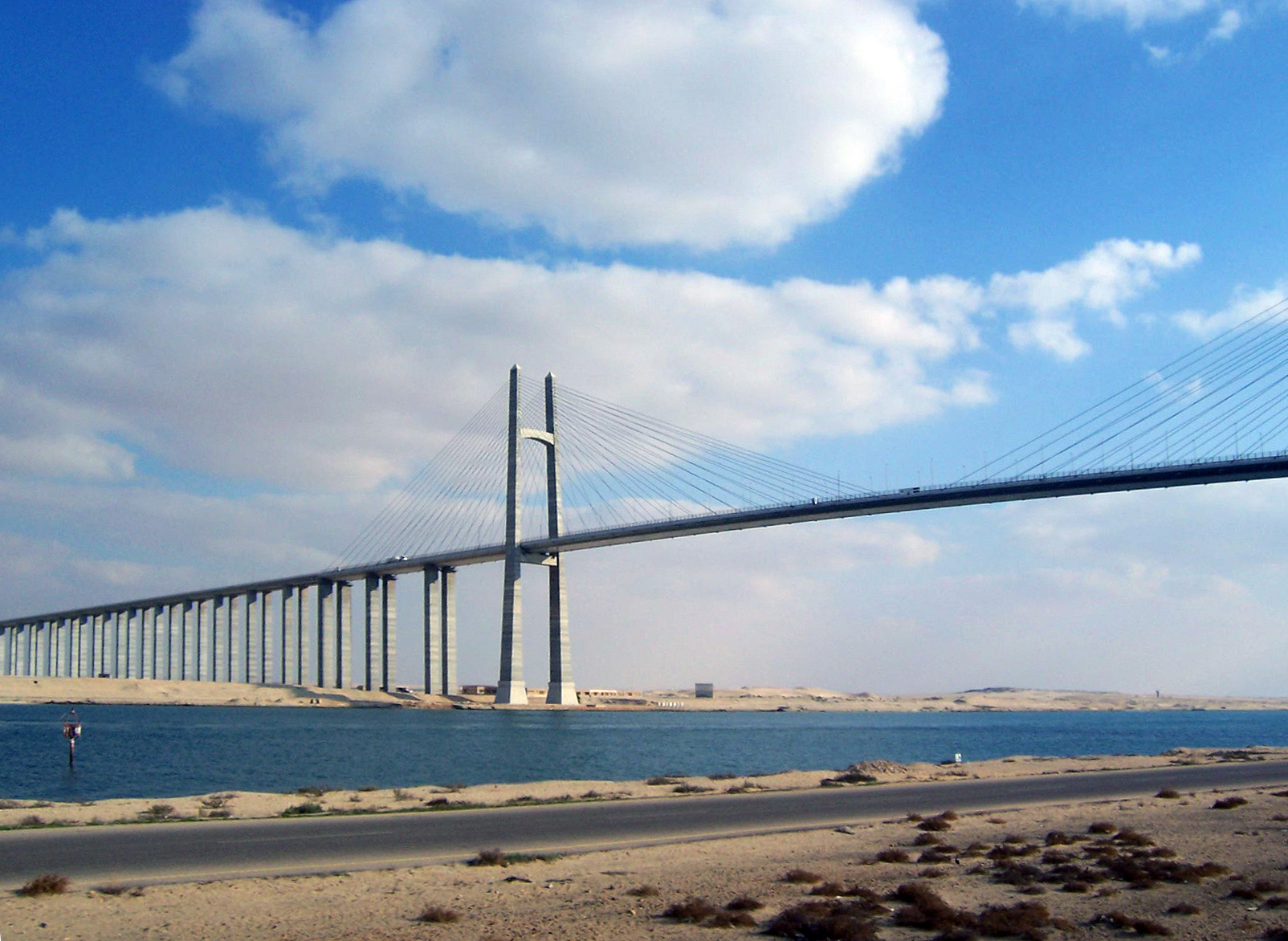
Western side of the bridge

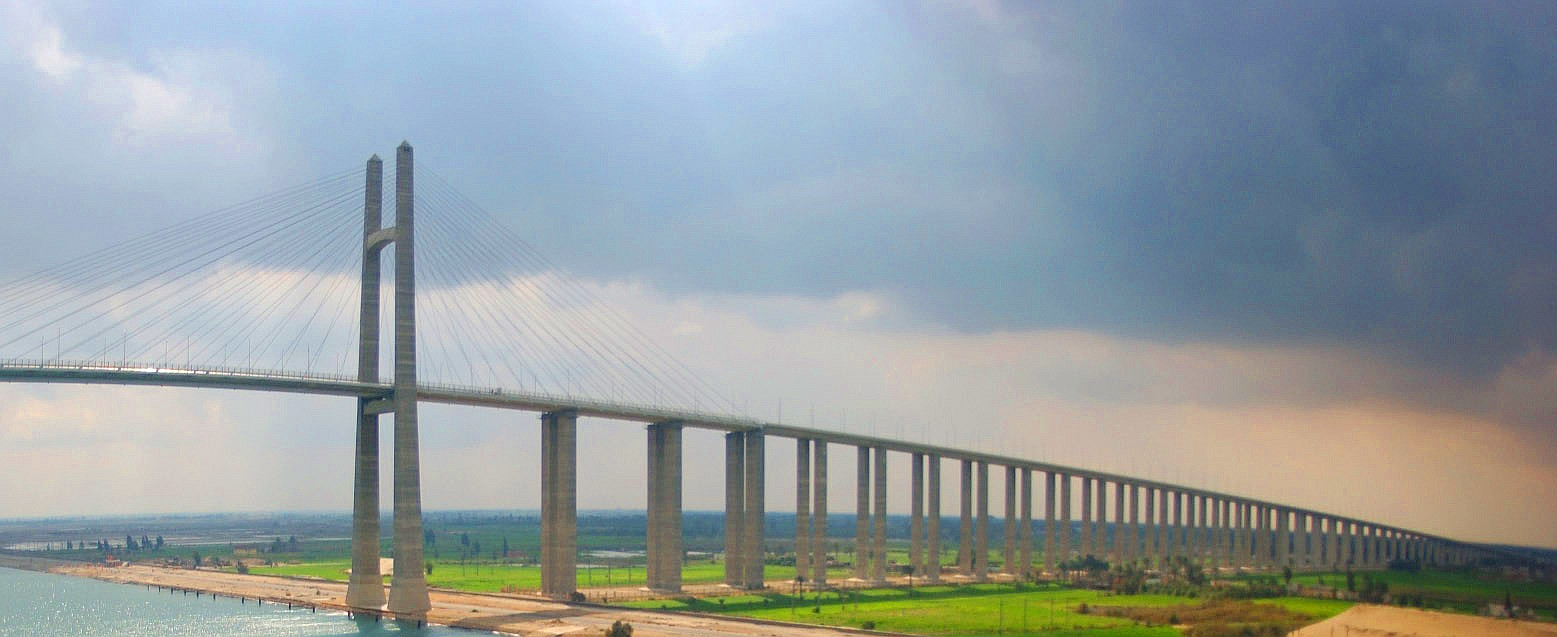
Eastern side of the bridge
