= El Qantara, Egypt =

El-Qantara el-Gharbîya القنطرة الغربية
- Town
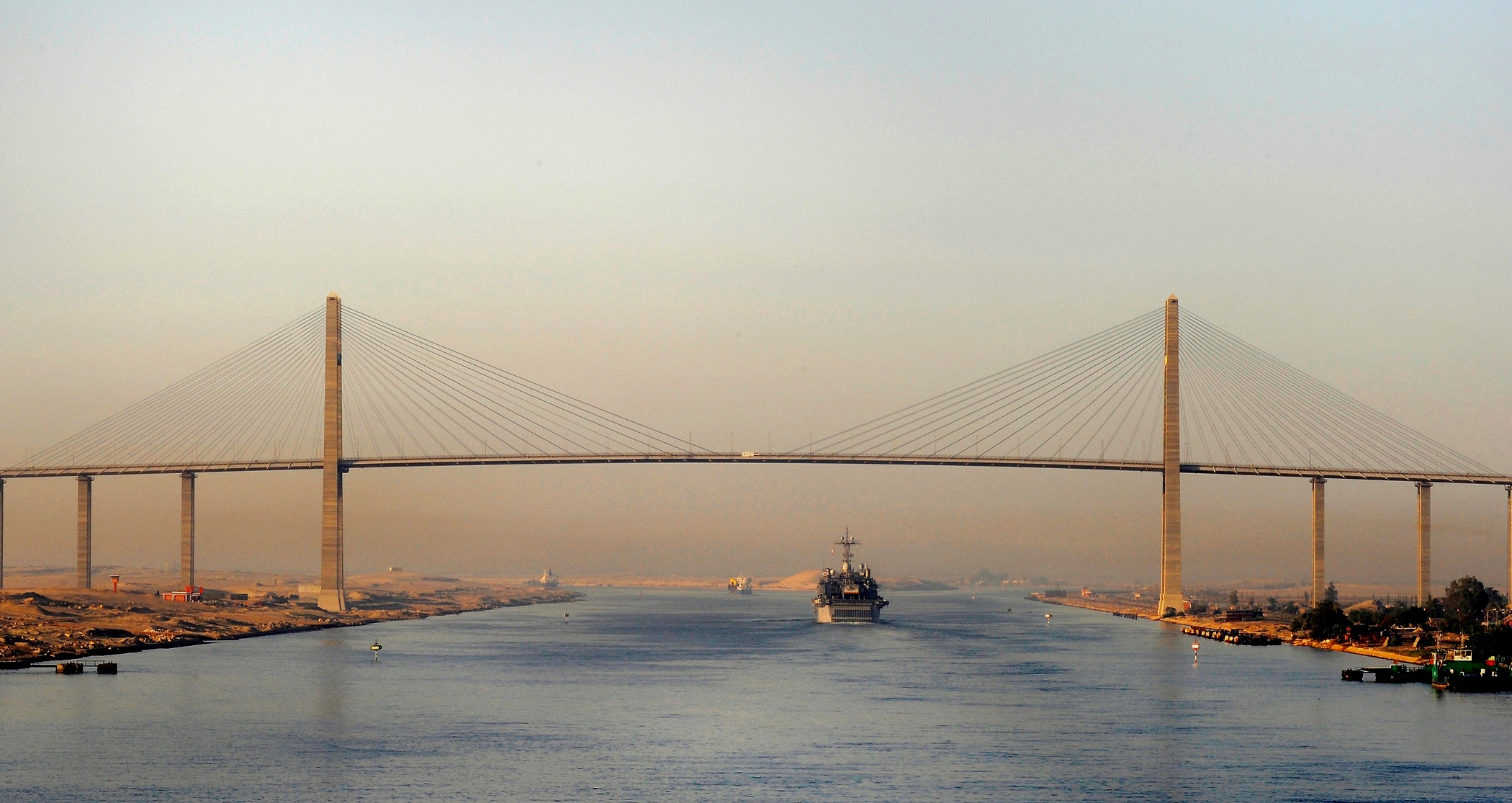
- The Suez Canal Bridge in El Qantara, Egypt.

- Location in Egypt El-Qantara el-Gharbîya (Nile Delta)
- Coordinates: 30°51′20″N 32°18′45″E
- Country: Egypt
- Governorate: Ismailia

Area
  - Total: 6.34 km^{2} (2.45 sq mi)

Population (2023)
  - Total: 49,906
  - Density: 7,870/km^{2} (20,400/sq mi)
- Time zone: UTC+2 (EET)
  - Summer (DST): UTC+3 (EEST)

El Qantara (Arabic: القنطرة, romanized: al qantara, lit. 'the bridge') is a northeastern Egyptian city on both sides of the Suez Canal, in the Egyptian governorate of Ismailia, 160 kilometres (99 mi) northeast of Cairo and 50 kilometres (31 mi) south of Port Said. The two parts of the city are connected by a high-level fixed road bridge, the Mubarak Peace Bridge. The bridge makes a connection between the division of Africa, and Asia, making El Qantara a border town.

== History ==
El Qantara was built next to the site of the ancient city of Sele (Ancient Greek: Σελη, Coptic: ϩⲗⲗⲏ, ⲛⲗⲏ, ⲥⲉⲗⲏ, Ancient Egyptian: Ṯȝrw Tcharou).

During World War I, Kantara, as it was referred to by the Allied troops, was the site of Headquarters No. 3 Section, Canal Defences and Headquarters Eastern Force during the latter stages of the Defence of the Suez Canal Campaign and the Sinai Campaign of 1916. The massive distribution warehouse and hospital centre supported and supplied all British, Australian and New Zealand operations in the Sinai from 1916 until final demobilization in 1919.

Beginning in January 1916, a new railway was constructed from Kantara to Romani, and eastward through the Sinai to El Arish and Rafa on the border with the Ottoman Empire. A water pipeline was constructed along the same route by the Royal Engineers under the command of Brigadier General Everard Blair.

The Commonwealth War Graves Commission Cemetery and Memorial is located outside of town. It was begun in February, 1916 and remained in use until late 1920. After the war, it was doubled in size to accommodate the remains of soldiers from makeshift cemeteries and desert battlefields, notably in Qatia, Rumani, Magdhaba, El Arish and Rafa. Formally designed in 1919 by Sir Robert Lorimer, the cemetery contains 1,562 Commonwealth burials from World War I and 110 from World War II. There are also 341 war graves of other nationalities. The Kantara Memorial bears the names of 16 New Zealand World War I servicemen presumed killed in action at Rafa and Rumani. In 1961, panels bearing the names of 283 World War I Indian servicemen, interred in the now inaccessible Kantara Indian Cemetery, were affixed to the wall behind the Stone of Remembrance, forming the Kantara Indian Cemetery Memorial.

The town's importance as a hospital centre was renewed during World War II when General Hospital No. 1 was located there from July 1941 to December 1945, and General Hospitals Nos. 41 and 92 at different periods. No. 8 Polish General Hospital was constructed adjoining the war cemetery.

During the 1967 Six Day War, Israel captured the town. Egypt recaptured it at the start of the 1973 Yom Kippur War during The Crossing, and held it until the ceasefire was negotiated. Egypt regained formal control over the town in 1974.

== Archaeology ==
In August 2026, archaeologists excavating Tell Abu Saifi in Qantara uncovered a large sandstone lintel inscribed with the titles of Ramesses II and a reference to restoration work on a statue of Horus, Lord of Mesen, providing evidence for a possible connection between the site and the ancient city of Mesen. Excavations also revealed a large mudbrick enclosure surrounding a temple, two successive stone roads dating to the Ptolemaic and Roman periods, storage and service rooms, and a sanctuary later destroyed by quarrying. Other finds included a 26th-Dynasty schist statue of an army scribe, a royal basalt statue torso, and fragments of falcon statues. The site was later reused as a Roman military barracks in the 3rd century CE and subsequently as a lime quarry during the Late Roman period.

== See also ==
- List of cities and towns in Egypt
- Qantara Sharq
