= Kamel al-Wazir =

Egyptian politician (born 1957)

- كامل الوزير البسيوني
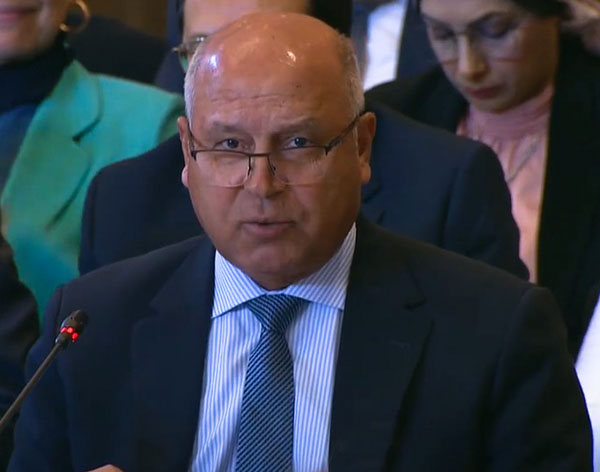
- Wazir in 2023

Deputy Prime Minister of Egypt
- Incumbent
- Assumed office 3 July 2024
- President: Abdel Fattah el-Sisi
- Prime Minister: Mostafa Madbouly

Minister of Transportation
- Incumbent
- Assumed office 11 March 2019
- President: Abdel Fattah el-Sisi
- Prime Minister: Mostafa Madbouly
- Preceded by: Hisham Arafat

Minister of Industry
- Incumbent
- Assumed office 3 July 2024
- President: Abdel Fattah el-Sisi
- Prime Minister: Mostafa Madbouly
- Preceded by: Ahmed Samir

Head of the Armed Forces Engineering Authority
- In office July 2014 – 11 March 2019
- President: Abdel Fattah el-Sisi; Adly Mansour
- Preceded by: Ehab al-Far
- Succeeded by: Emad al-Alfi

Personal details
- Born: Kamel Abdelhady Farag el-Wazir; 1957 (age 68–69) Dakahlia, Egypt
- Education: Military Technical College

Military service
- Branch/service: Egyptian Army
- Years of service: 1980–2019
- Rank: Lieutenant-General
- Unit: Military Engineers Corps

Kamel al-Wazir (Arabic: كامل الوزير) is the transportation minister, the industry and trade minister and the deputy prime minister of Egypt. He succeeded Minister Hisham Arafat who resigned after the Ramses Station rail disaster. Kamel al-Wazir had been heading the Engineering Authority of the Armed Forces before being appointed the minister.

During his tenure, an accident happened as two trains collided near Sohag, for which he issued an official apology.

== Early life and career ==
Wazir studied Civil and Architectural Engineering at the Military Technical College and also holds a Masters in Military Sciences. He was involved in key projects of Egypt like digging of the new Suez Canal, developing the Al Galala Plateau in Ain Sukhna.

He was the Head of the Armed Forces Engineering Authority from 2015 until 2019.

== Ministry appointment ==
Kamel Wazir was appointed as Minister of Transport in 2019. This was expanded in 2024 to a joint Minister of Transport and Industry. President el-Sisi justified the appointment by saying “I'm giving the ministry to one of the best military officers”.

The following data shows the number of car and train accidents under his tenure.

Car and train in Egypt, 2019–2025
Year	Car injuries	Car deaths	Train injuries	Train deaths
2019	79,904	6,722	889	525
2020	56,789	6,178	525	296
2021	51,511	7,326	769	405
2022	55,991	7,762	554	410
2023	71,016	5,861	51	53
2024	76,362	5,260	104	57
2025	84,553	5,829	139	39

== Awards ==
- Medal of Long Service and Good Example
- Medal of Military Duty, first degree
