= Suez Canal =

Artificial sea-level waterway in Egypt

- The Suez Canal from space, showing the Great Bitter Lake at the centre (after the 2015 expansion)
- Interactive map of Suez Canal

Specifications
- Length: 193.3 km (120.1 miles)
- Maximum boat beam: 77.5 m (254 ft 3 in)
- Maximum boat draft: 20.1 m (66 ft)
- Locks: None
- Navigation authority: Suez Canal Authority

History
- Construction began: 25 April 1859; 167 years ago
- Date completed: 17 November 1869; 157 years ago

Geography
- Start point: Port Said
- End point: Suez Port

The Suez Canal (/ˈsuː.ɛz/; Egyptian Arabic: قناة السويس, Qanāt as-Suwais) is an artificial sea-level waterway in Egypt, connecting the Mediterranean Sea to the Red Sea through the Isthmus of Suez and dividing Africa and Asia (and by extension, the Sinai Peninsula from the rest of Egypt). Opened in 1869, the 193.3-kilometre (120.1-mile) canal is a key trade route between Europe and Asia; in 2021, more than 20,600 vessels traversed the canal, an average of 56 per day.

Extending from the northern terminus of Port Said to the southern terminus of Port Tewfik at the city of Suez, the canal offers vessels a direct route between the North Atlantic and northern Indian oceans via the Mediterranean Sea and the Red Sea, avoiding the South Atlantic and southern Indian oceans. This shrinks the journey from the Arabian Sea to London by about 8,900 km (5,500 mi) to 10 days at 20 knots (37 km/h; 23 mph) or 8 days at 24 knots (44 km/h; 28 mph).

In 1858, French diplomat Ferdinand de Lesseps formed the Compagnie de Suez to build the canal. Construction began the following year, and the canal opened on 17 November 1869 as a single-lane waterway with passing locations in the Ballah Bypass and the Great Bitter Lake. It was designed by Alois Negrelli without locks; seawater flows freely through it. In general, the water in the canal north of the Bitter Lakes flows north in winter and south in summer. South of the lakes, the current changes with the tide at Suez.

The canal was the property of the Egyptian government, but European shareholders, mostly British and French, owned the concessionary company that operated it until 1956, when President Gamal Abdel Nasser nationalised it, leading to the monthlong Suez Crisis. Today the canal is operated and maintained by Egypt's state-owned Suez Canal Authority.

Under the Convention of Constantinople, the canal may be used "in time of war as in time of peace, by every vessel of commerce or of war, without distinction of flag." It is an important naval shortcut and choke point, particularly for countries with coastlines and naval bases on the Mediterranean Sea and the Red Sea. Egypt closed the canal at the beginning of the Six-Day War in 1967, and it remained closed until 1975.

In 2016, expansion efforts widened the Ballah Bypass for 35 km (22 mi) to decrease the canal's transit time, nearly double daily capacity from 49 to 97 ships, and create a new terminal at the canal's northern end. The LE (Egyptian Pound) 59.4 billion (US$9 billion) project was funded with interest-bearing investment certificates issued exclusively to Egyptian entities and individuals.

The southern terminus of the Suez Canal

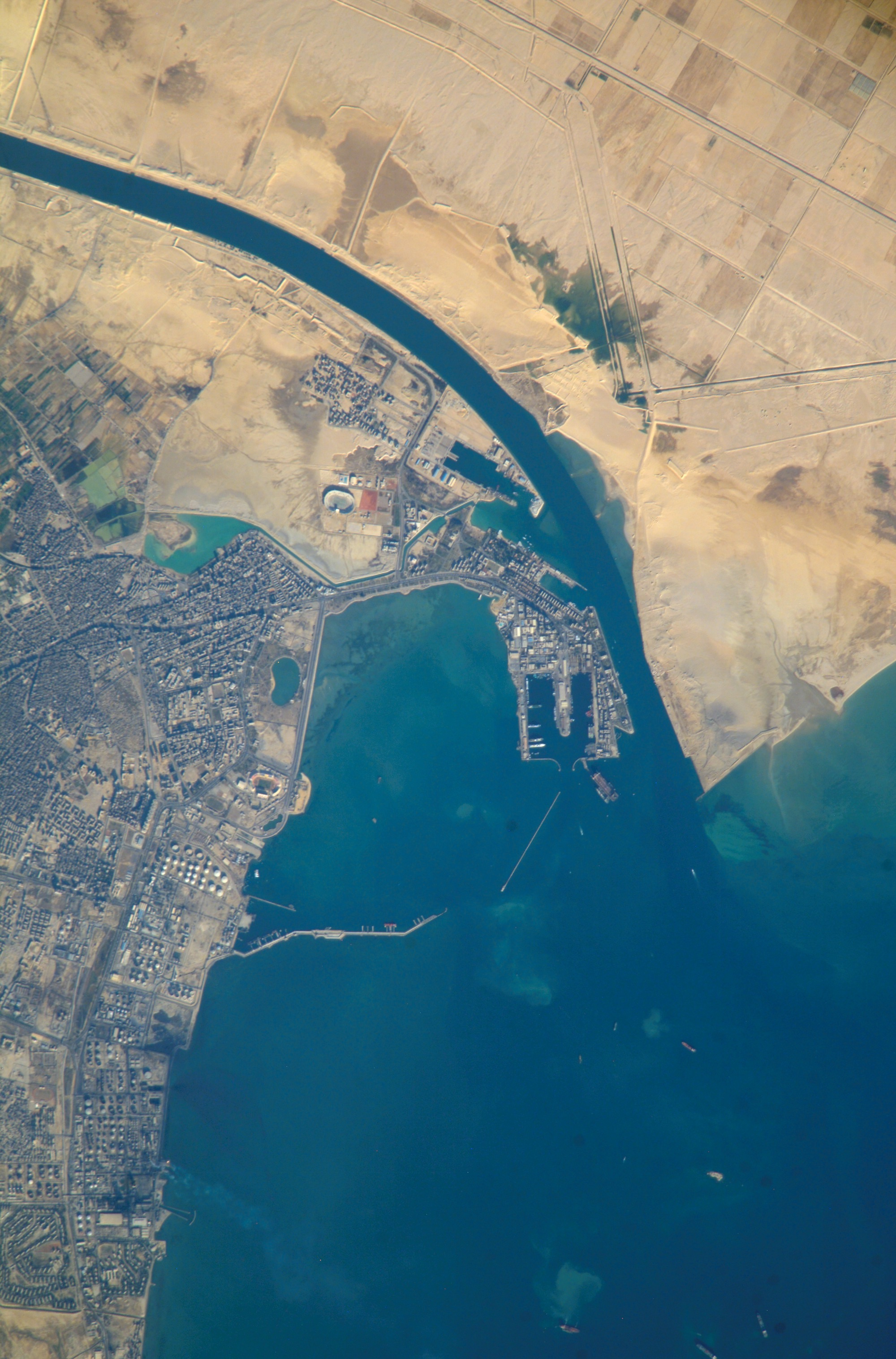
As seen from the International Space Station (from a nominal altitude of 400 kilometres (250 miles))

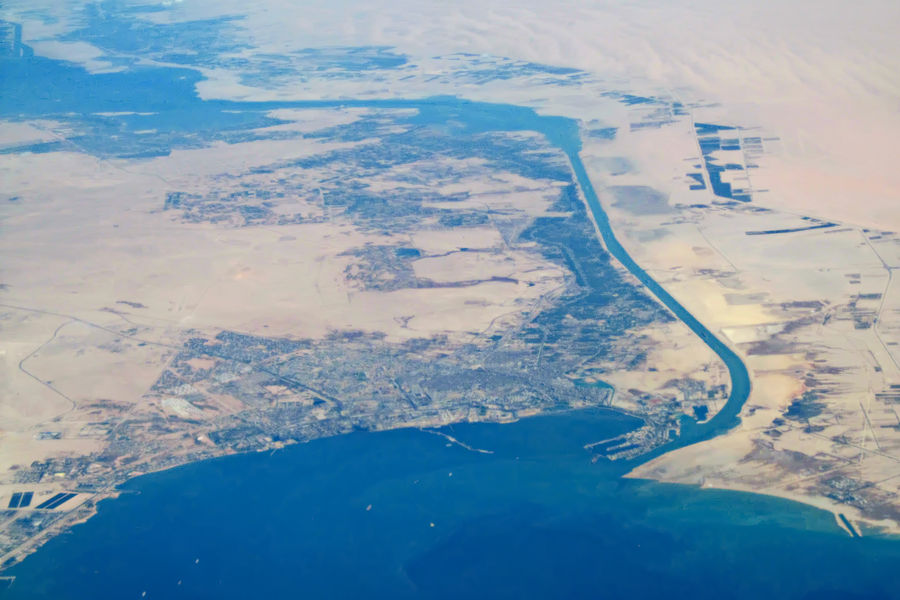
An aerial view looking north towards the town of Suez

== Precursors ==
Canal of the Pharaohs, which followed Wadi Tumilat

Ancient west–east canals were built to facilitate travel from the Nile to the Red Sea. One smaller canal is believed to have been constructed under the auspices of Senusret II or Ramesses II. Another canal, probably incorporating a portion of the first, was constructed under the reign of Necho II (610–595 BCE), but the only fully functional canal was engineered and completed by Darius I (522–486 BCE).

=== Second millennium BCE ===
James Henry Breasted attributes the earliest-known attempt to construct a canal to the first cataract, near Aswan, to the Sixth Dynasty of Egypt and its completion to Senusret III (1878–1839 BCE) of the Twelfth Dynasty of Egypt.

The legendary Sesostris (likely either Pharaoh Senusret II or Senusret III of the Twelfth Dynasty of Egypt) may have constructed the ancient canal, the Canal of the Pharaohs, joining the Nile with the Red Sea (1897–1839 BCE), when an irrigation channel was constructed around 1848 BCE that was navigable during the flood season, leading into a dry river valley east of the Nile River Delta named Wadi Tumilat. (In ancient times, the Red Sea may have reached northward to the Bitter Lakes and Lake Timsah).

In his Meteorology, Aristotle (384–322 BCE) wrote:

One of their kings tried to make a canal to it (for it would have been of no little advantage to them for the whole region to have become navigable; Sesostris is said to have been the first of the ancient kings to try), but he found that the sea was higher than the land. So he first, and Darius afterwards, stopped making the canal, lest the sea should mix with the river water and spoil it.

Strabo wrote that Sesostris started to build a canal, and Pliny the Elder (23/24–79 CE) wrote:

165. Next comes the Tyro tribe and, the harbour of the Daneoi, from which Sesostris, king of Egypt, intended to carry a ship-canal to where the Nile flows into what is known as the Delta; this is a distance of over 60 miles (100 km). Later the Persian king Darius had the same idea, and yet again Ptolemy II, who made a trench 100 feet (30 m) wide, 30 feet (9 m) deep and about 35 miles (55 km) long, as far as the Bitter Lakes.

In the 20th century, the northward extension of the later Darius I canal was discovered, extending from Lake Timsah to the Ballah Lakes. This was dated to the Middle Kingdom of Egypt by extrapolating the dates of ancient sites along its course.

The reliefs of the Punt expedition under Hatshepsut, 1470 BCE, depict seagoing vessels carrying the expeditionary force returning from Punt. This suggests that a navigable link existed between the Red Sea and the Nile. Recent excavations in Wadi Gawasis may indicate that Egypt's maritime trade started from the Red Sea and did not require a canal. Evidence seems to indicate its existence by the 13th century BCE during the time of Ramesses II.

=== Canals dug by Necho, Darius I and Ptolemy ===
Remnants of an ancient west–east canal through the ancient Egyptian cities of Bubastis, Pi-Ramesses, and Pithom were discovered by Napoleon Bonaparte and his engineers and cartographers in 1799.

According to the Histories of the Greek historian Herodotus, about 600 BCE, Necho II undertook to dig a west–east canal through the Wadi Tumilat between Bubastis and Heroopolis, and perhaps continued it to the Heroopolite Gulf and the Red Sea. Regardless, Necho is reported as having never completed his project.

Herodotus was told that 120,000 men perished in this undertaking, but this figure is doubtless exaggerated. According to Pliny the Elder, Necho's extension to the canal was about 92 kilometres (57 statute miles), equal to the total distance between Bubastis and the Great Bitter Lake, allowing for winding through valleys. The length that Herodotus tells, of over 1,000 stadia (i.e., over 183 kilometres or 114 miles), must be understood to include the entire distance between the Nile and the Red Sea at that time.

With Necho's death, work was discontinued. Herodotus tells that the reason the project was abandoned was because of a warning received from an oracle that others would benefit from its successful completion. Necho's war with Nebuchadnezzar II most probably prevented the canal's continuation.

Necho's project was completed by Darius I of Persia, who ruled over Ancient Egypt after it had been conquered by his predecessor Cambyses II. It may be that by Darius's time a natural waterway passage which had existed between the Heroopolite Gulf and the Red Sea in the vicinity of the Egyptian town of Shaluf (alt. Chalouf or Shaloof), located just south of the Great Bitter Lake, had become so blocked with silt that Darius needed to clear it out so as to allow navigation once again. According to Herodotus, Darius's canal was wide enough that two triremes could pass each other with oars extended, and required four days to traverse. Darius commemorated his achievement with a number of granite stelae that he set up on the Nile bank, including one near Kabret, and a further one a few kilometres north of Suez. Darius the Great's Suez Inscriptions read:

King Darius says: I am a Persian; setting out from Persia I conquered Egypt. I ordered to dig this canal from the river that is called Nile and flows in Egypt, to the sea that begins in Persia. Therefore, when this canal had been dug as I had ordered, ships went from Egypt through this canal to Persia, as I had intended

— Darius Inscription

The canal left the Nile at Bubastis. An inscription on a pillar at Pithom records that in 270 or 269 BCE, it was again reopened, by Ptolemy II Philadelphus. In Arsinoe, Ptolemy constructed a navigable lock, with sluices, at the Heroopolite Gulf of the Red Sea, which allowed the passage of vessels but prevented salt water from the Red Sea from mingling with the fresh water in the canal.

In the second half of the 19th century, French cartographers discovered the remnants of an ancient north–south canal past the east side of Lake Timsah and ending near the north end of the Great Bitter Lake. This proved to be the canal made by Darius I, as his stele commemorating its construction was found at the site. (This ancient, second canal may have followed a course along the shoreline of the Red Sea when it once extended north to Lake Timsah.)

=== Receding Red Sea and the dwindling Nile ===
The Red Sea is believed by some historians to have gradually receded over the centuries, its coastline slowly moving southward away from Lake Timsah and the Great Bitter Lake. Coupled with persistent accumulations of Nile silt, maintenance and repair of Ptolemy's canal became increasingly cumbersome over each passing century.

Two hundred years after the construction of Ptolemy's canal, Cleopatra seems to have had no west–east waterway passage, because the Pelusiac branch of the Nile, which fed Ptolemy's west–east canal, had by that time dwindled, being choked with silt. In support of this contention, one can note that in 31 BCE, during a reversal of fortune in Mark Antony's and Cleopatra's war against Octavian, she attempted to escape Egypt with her fleet by raising the ships out of the Mediterranean and dragging them across the isthmus of Suez to the Red Sea. Then, according to Plutarch, the Arabs of Petra attacked and burned the first wave of these ships and Cleopatra abandoned the effort. (Modern historians, however, maintain that her ships were burned by the enemy forces of Malichus I.)

=== Cairo to the Red Sea ===
The ancient canal was re-excavated by Roman emperor Trajan in the first century CE, who named it Amnis Traianus after himself. He reportedly moved its mouth on the Nile further south, at the site of what is now Old Cairo. By the time of the Arab conquest in 641, this canal had fallen out of use. The commander of the Muslim force, Amr ibn al-As, ordered that it be restored so as to improve connections between Egypt and Medina, the Muslim capital at the time. The Muslim canal was excavated further north from Trajan's canal, joining the Nile close to what is now the Sayyida Zaynab neighbourhood of Cairo. This canal reportedly ended near modern Suez. The site of the former Roman channel near the Nile was absorbed into the new city of Fustat.

A geography treatise De Mensura Orbis Terrae written by the Irish monk Dicuil (born late 8th century) reports a conversation with another monk, Fidelis, who had sailed on the canal from the Nile to the Red Sea during a pilgrimage to the Holy Land in the first half of the 8th century.

The Abbasid caliph al-Mansur is said to have ordered this canal closed in 767 to prevent supplies from reaching Arabian detractors. The Fatimid caliph al-Hakim is claimed to have repaired the Cairo to Red Sea passageway, but only briefly, c. 1000, as it soon "became choked with sand". The remaining section of the canal near the Nile, known as the Khalij, continued to serve as part of Cairo's water infrastructure until the 19th century. In later periods, the canal was closed with a dike for much of the year and reopened during the flood season.

=== Conception by Venice ===
The successful 1488 navigation of southern Africa by Bartolomeu Dias opened a direct maritime trading route to India and the Spice Islands, and forever changed the balance of Mediterranean trade. One of the most prominent losers in the new order, as former middlemen, was the former spice trading center of Venice.

Venetian leaders, driven to desperation, contemplated digging a waterway between the Red Sea and the Nile—anticipating the Suez Canal by almost 400 years—to bring the luxury trade flooding to their doors again. But this remained a dream.

— Colin Thubron, Seafarers: The Venetians (1980), p. 102

Despite entering negotiations with Egypt's ruling Mamelukes, the Venetian plan to build the canal was quickly put to rest by the Ottoman conquest of Egypt in 1517, led by Sultan Selim I.

=== Ottoman attempts ===
During the 16th century, the Ottoman Grand Vizier Sokollu Mehmed Pasha attempted to construct a canal connecting the Red Sea and the Mediterranean. This was motivated by a desire to connect Constantinople to the pilgrimage and trade routes of the Indian Ocean, as well as by strategic concerns—as the European presence in the Indian Ocean was growing, Ottoman mercantile and strategic interests were increasingly challenged, and the Sublime Porte was increasingly pressed to assert its position. A navigable canal would allow the Ottoman Navy to connect its Red Sea, Black Sea, and Mediterranean fleets. However, this project was deemed too expensive, and was never completed.

=== Napoleon's discovery of an ancient canal ===
During the French campaign in Egypt and Syria in late 1798, Napoleon expressed interest in finding the remnants of an ancient waterway passage. This culminated in a cadre of archaeologists, scientists, cartographers and engineers scouring northern Egypt. Their findings, recorded in the Description de l'Égypte, include detailed maps that depict the discovery of an ancient canal extending northward from the Red Sea and then westward toward the Nile.

After becoming Emperor of France in 1804, Napoleon contemplated the construction of a north–south canal to connect the Mediterranean with the Red Sea. By avoiding the silt-laden Nile, such a canal would be easier to maintain. But the plan was abandoned because of the erroneous belief that the Red Sea was 8.5 m (28 ft) higher than the Mediterranean, and the waterway would thus require the costly and time-consuming construction of locks to operate. This was the result of using fragmentary survey measurements taken during the aforementioned war.

As late as 1861, the unnavigable ancient route discovered by Napoleon from Bubastis to the Red Sea still channelled water as far east as Kassassin.

== History of the Suez Canal ==
=== Interim period ===
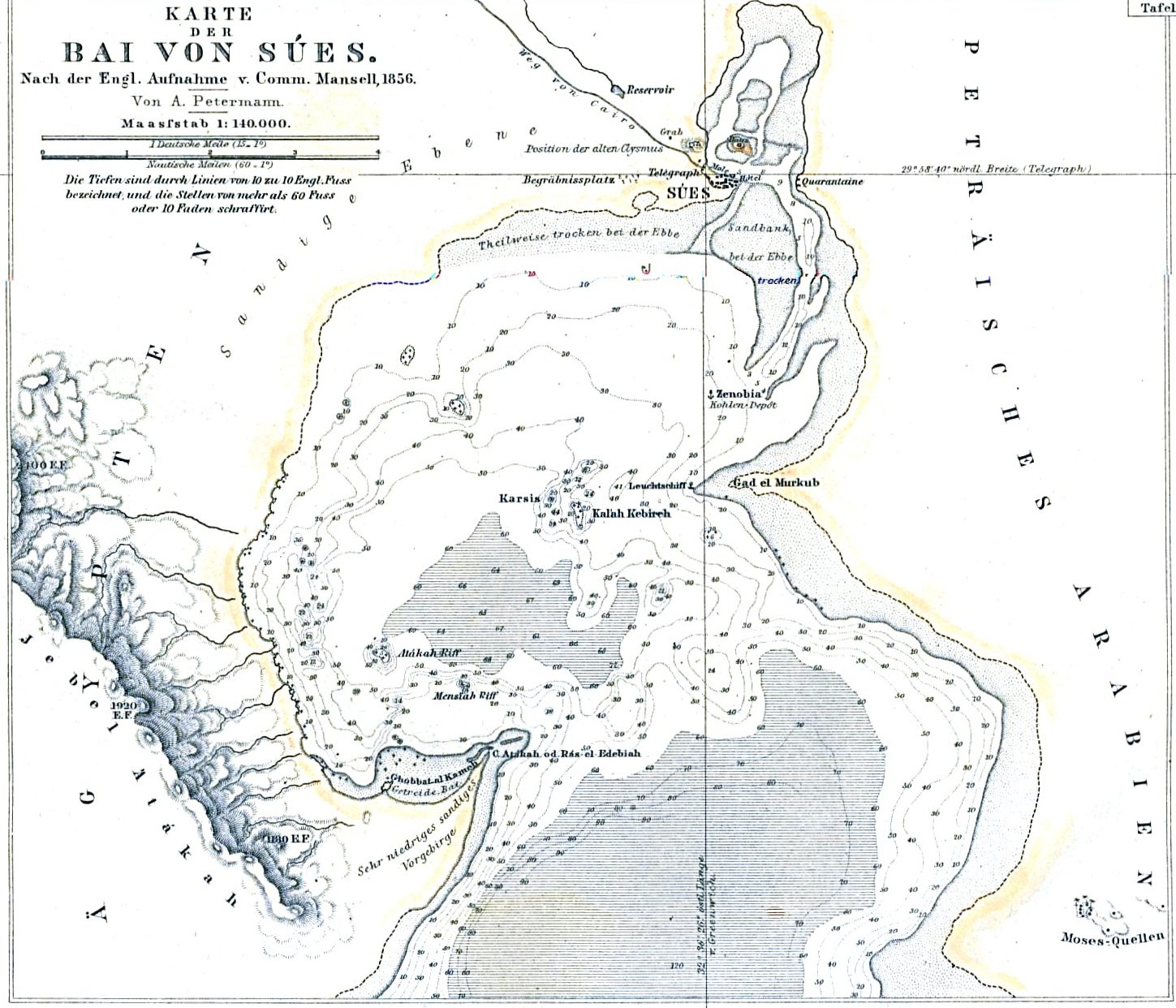
Bathymetric chart, northern Gulf of Suez, route to Cairo, 1856

Despite the construction challenges that could have been the result of the alleged difference in sea levels, the idea of finding a shorter route to the east remained alive. In 1830, General Francis Chesney submitted a report to the British government that stated that there was no difference in elevation and that the Suez Canal was feasible, but his report received no further attention. Lieutenant Waghorn established his "Overland Route", which transported post and passengers to India via Egypt. The usefulness of this route for the British Empire was shown when dealing with the Indian Rebellion of 1857, with 5,000 British troops having passed through Egypt.

Linant de Bellefonds, a French explorer of Egypt, became chief engineer of Egypt's Public Works. In addition to his normal duties, he surveyed the Isthmus of Suez and made plans for the Suez Canal. French Saint-Simonianists showed an interest in the canal and in 1833, Barthélemy Prosper Enfantin tried to draw Muhammad Ali's attention to the canal but was unsuccessful. Alois Negrelli, the Italian-Austrian railroad pioneer, became interested in the idea in 1836.

In 1846, Prosper Enfantin's Société d'Études du Canal de Suez invited a number of experts, among them Robert Stephenson, Negrelli and Paul-Adrien Bourdaloue to study the feasibility of the Suez Canal (with the assistance of Linant de Bellefonds). Bourdaloue's survey of the isthmus was the first generally accepted evidence that there was no practical difference in elevation between the two seas. Britain, however, feared that a canal open to everyone might interfere with its India trade and therefore preferred a connection by train from Alexandria via Cairo to Suez, which Stephenson eventually built.

=== Construction by the Suez Canal Company ===
==== Preparations (1854–1858) ====
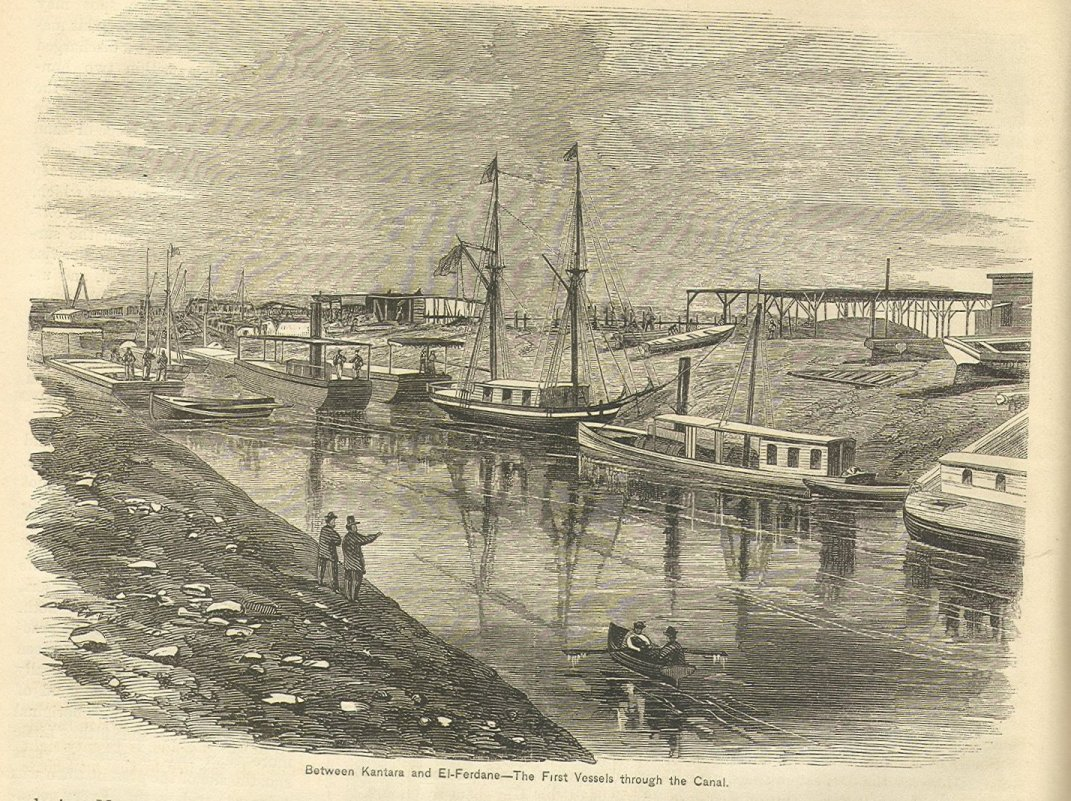
Suez Canal, 1869

In 1854 and 1856, Ferdinand de Lesseps obtained a concession from Sa'id Pasha, the Khedive of Egypt and Sudan, to create a company to construct a canal open to ships of all nations. The company was to operate the canal for 99 years from its opening. De Lesseps had used his friendly relationship with Sa'id, which he had developed while he was a French diplomat in the 1830s. As stipulated in the concessions, de Lesseps convened the International Commission for the piercing of the isthmus of Suez (Commission Internationale pour le percement de l'isthme de Suez) consisting of 13 experts from seven countries, among them John Robinson McClean, later President of the Institution of Civil Engineers in London, and again Negrelli, to examine the plans developed by Linant de Bellefonds, and to advise on the feasibility of and the best route for the canal. After surveys and analyses in Egypt and discussions in Paris on various aspects of the canal, where many of Negrelli's ideas prevailed, the commission produced a unanimous report in December 1856 containing a detailed description of the canal complete with plans and profiles. The Suez Canal Company (Compagnie universelle du canal maritime de Suez) came into being on 15 December 1858.

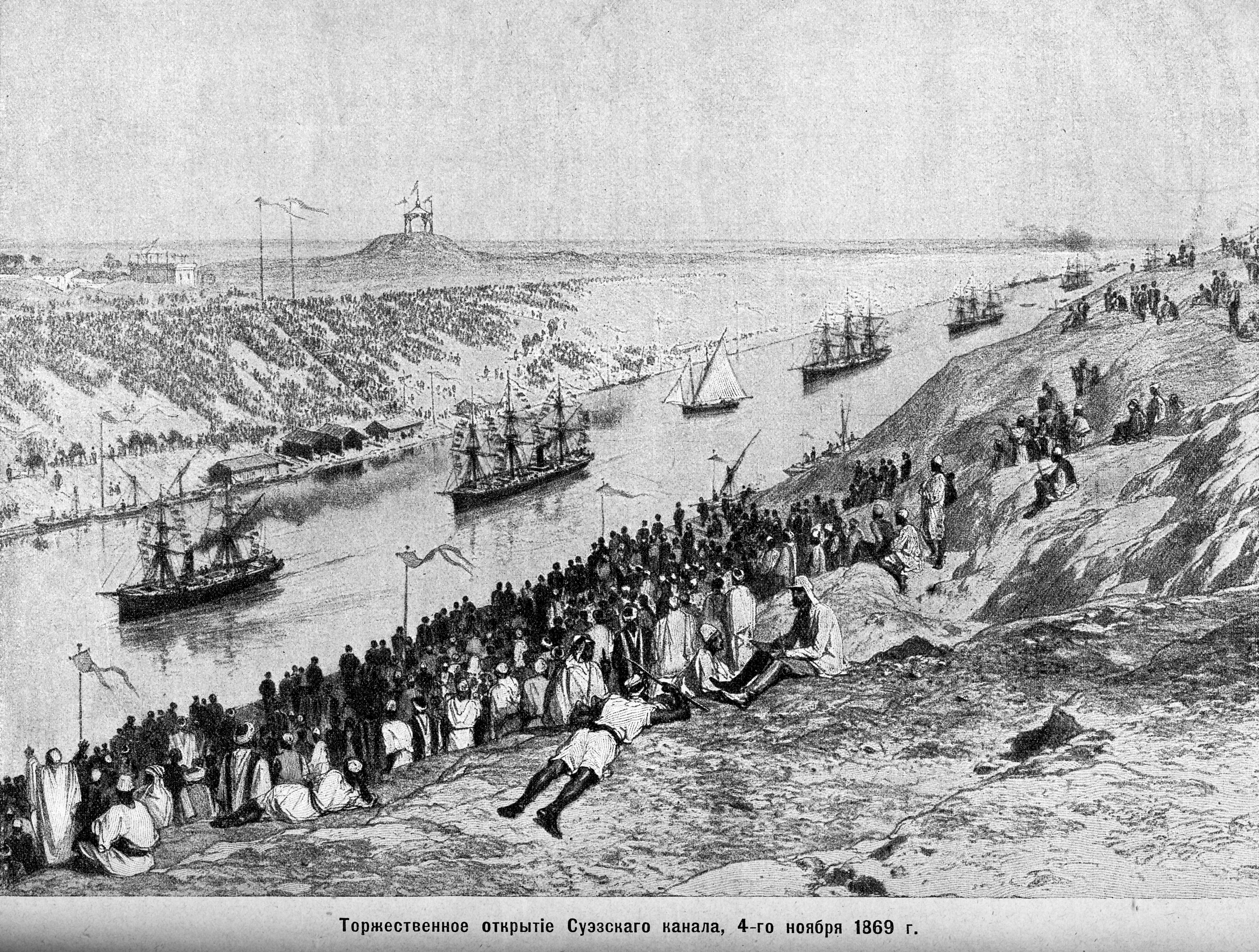
Opening of the Suez Canal, 1869

The British government had opposed the project from the outset to its completion. The British, who controlled the Cape Route to India and the Far East, favored the status quo, given that a canal might disrupt their commercial and maritime supremacy. Lord Palmerston, the project's most unwavering foe, confessed in the mid-1850s the real motive behind his opposition: that Britain's commercial and maritime relations would be overthrown by the opening of a new route, open to all nations, and thus deprive his country of its present exclusive advantages. As one of the diplomatic moves against the project when it nevertheless went ahead, it disapproved of the use of "forced labour" for construction of the canal. Involuntary labour on the project ceased, and the viceroy condemned the corvée, halting the project.

International opinion was initially skeptical, and shares of the Suez Canal Company did not sell well overseas. Britain, Austria, and Russia did not buy a significant number of shares. With assistance from the Cattaui banking family, and their relationship with James de Rothschild of the French House of Rothschild, bonds and shares were successfully promoted in France and other parts of Europe. All French shares were quickly sold in France. A contemporary British skeptic claimed "One thing is sure... our local merchant community doesn't pay practical attention at all to this grand work, and it is legitimate to doubt that the canal's receipts... could ever be sufficient to recover its maintenance fee. It will never become a large ship's accessible way in any case."

==== Construction (1859–1869) ====
Work started on the shore of the future Port Said on 25 April 1859.

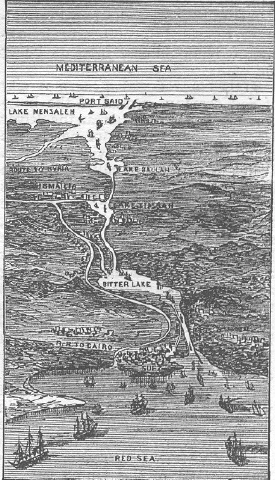
1881 drawing of the Suez Canal

The excavation took some 10 years, with forced labour (corvée) being employed until 1864 to dig out the canal. Some sources estimate that over 30,000 people were working on the canal at any given period, that more than 1.5 million people from various countries were employed, and that tens of thousands of labourers died, many of them from cholera and similar epidemics.

Estimates of the number of deaths vary widely, with Gamal Abdel Nasser citing 120,000 deaths upon nationalisation of the canal in a 26 July 1956 speech and the company's chief medical officer reporting no higher than 2.49 deaths per thousand in 1866. Doubling these estimates with a generous assumption of 50,000 working staff per year over 11 years would put a conservative estimate at fewer than 3,000 deaths. More closely relying on the limited reported data of the time, the number would be fewer than 1,000.

=== Company towns ===
From its inauguration until 1925, the Suez Canal Company built a series of company towns along the canal to serve its operation. They included ports and their facilities as well as housing for employees, segregated by race or nationality. These were Port Said (1869) and Port Fuad (1925) at the canal's northern entrance by the Mediterranenan, Ismailia (1862) near the middle and north of Lake Timsah, and Port Tewfik (1867) at the canal's southern entrance on the Red Sea.

=== Inauguration (17 November 1869) ===
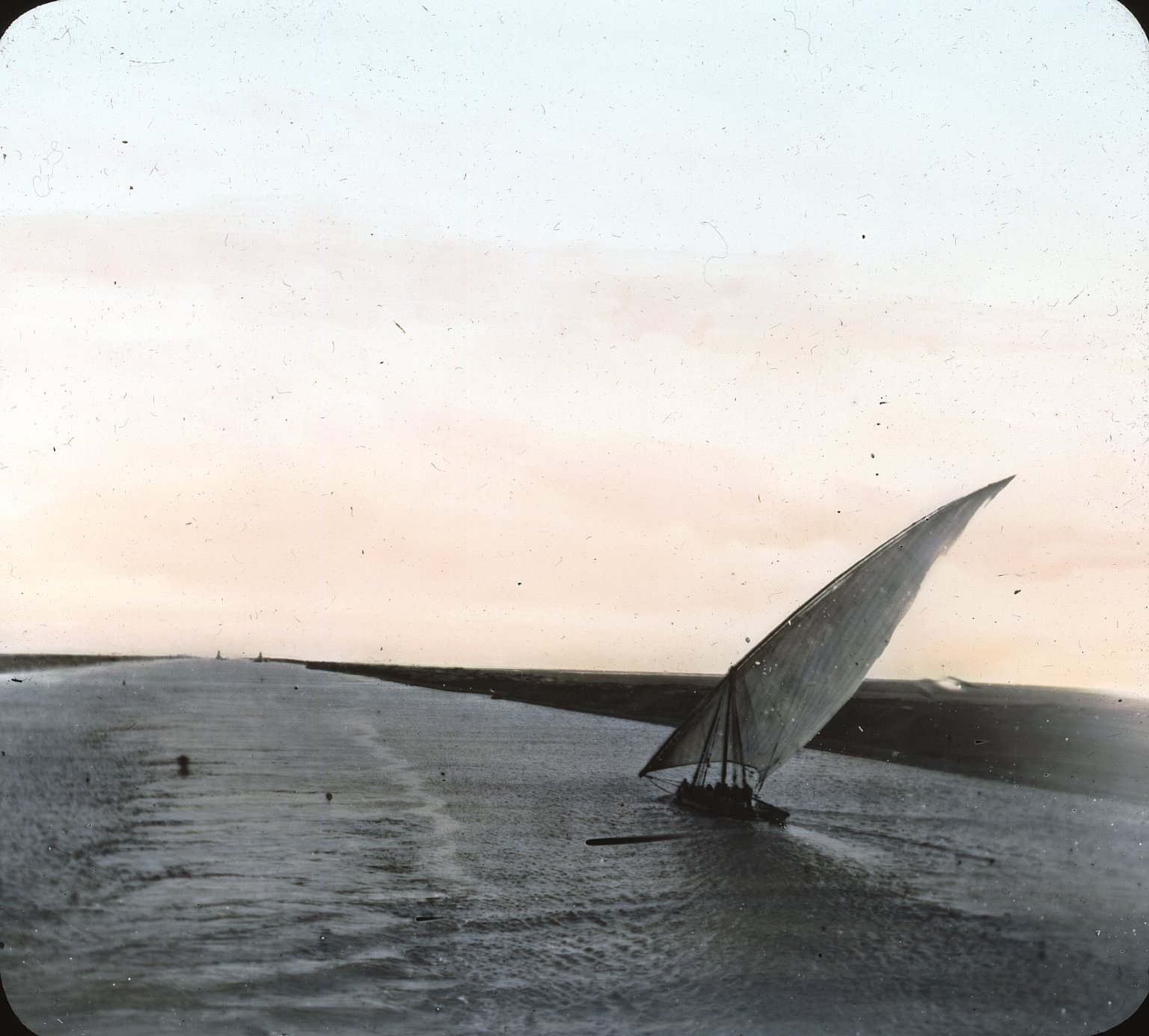
Suez Canal, Egypt. Early 1900s. Goodyear Archival Collection. Brooklyn Museum.

The canal opened under French control in November 1869. The opening ceremonies began at Port Said on the evening of 15 November, with illuminations, fireworks, and a banquet on the yacht of the Khedive Isma'il Pasha of Egypt and Sudan. The royal guests arrived the following morning: the Emperor Franz Joseph I, the French Empress Eugenie in the Imperial yacht L'Aigle, the Crown Prince of Prussia, and Prince Louis of Hesse. Other international guests included the American natural historian H. W. Harkness. In the afternoon there were blessings of the canal with both Muslim and Christian ceremonies, a temporary mosque and church having been built side by side on the beach. In the evening, there were more illuminations and fireworks.

Nautical chart of the Suez Canal published shortly after the inauguration, with survey data from HMS Newport under George Nares.

On the morning of 17 November, a procession of ships entered the canal, headed by L'Aigle. Among the ships following was HMS Newport, captained by George Nares, who surveyed the canal on behalf of the Admiralty a few months later. Newport was involved in an incident that demonstrated some of the problems with the canal. There were suggestions that the depth of parts of the canal at the time of the inauguration were not as great as promised, and that the deepest part of the channel was not always clear, leading to a risk of grounding. The first day of the passage ended at Lake Timsah, 76 kilometres (41 nmi) south of Port Said. The French ship Péluse anchored close to the entrance, then swung around and grounded, the ship and its hawser blocking the way into the lake. Most of the ships following had to anchor in the canal itself until Péluse was hauled clear the next morning, making it difficult for them to join that night's celebration in Ismailia. Nares, however, sent a boat to carry out soundings, and was able to manoeuvre Newport around the blockage to enter the lake and anchor there for the night.

Ismailia was the scene of more celebrations the following day, including a military "march past", illuminations and fireworks, and a ball at the Governor's Palace. The convoy set off again on the morning of 19 November, for the remainder of the trip to Suez. After Suez, many of the participants headed for Cairo, and then to the Pyramids, where a new road had been built for the occasion.

An Anchor Line steamship, Dido, became the first to pass through the Canal from South to North.

==== Initial difficulties (1869–1871) ====
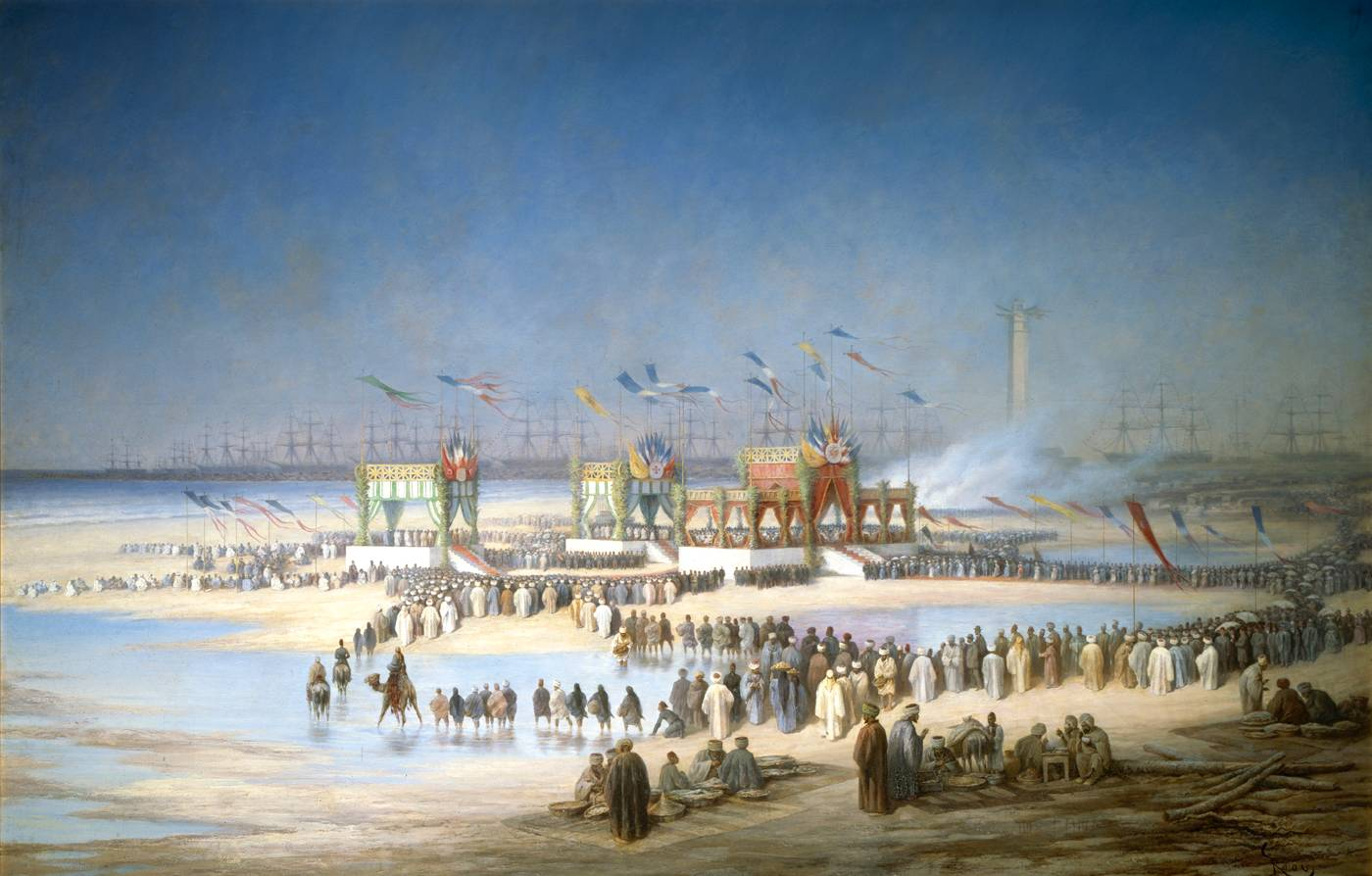
Inauguration ceremony of the Suez canal at Port Said, 17 November 1869, by French artist Édouard Riou.

Although numerous technical, political, and financial problems had been overcome, the final cost was more than double the original estimate.

The Khedive, in particular, was able to overcome initial reservations held by both British and French creditors by enlisting the help of the Sursock family, whose deep connections proved invaluable in securing much international support for the project.

After the opening, the Suez Canal Company was in financial difficulties. The remaining works were completed only in 1871, and traffic was below expectations in the first two years. De Lesseps therefore tried to increase revenues by interpreting the kind of net ton referred to in the second concession (tonneau de capacité) as meaning a ship's cargo capacity and not only the theoretical net tonnage of the "Moorsom System" introduced in Britain by the Merchant Shipping Act in 1854. The ensuing commercial and diplomatic activities resulted in the International Commission of Constantinople establishing a specific kind of net tonnage and settling the question of tariffs in its protocol of 18 December 1873. This was the origin of the Suez Canal Net Tonnage and the Suez Canal Special Tonnage Certificate, both of which are still in use today.

=== Growth and reorganisation ===
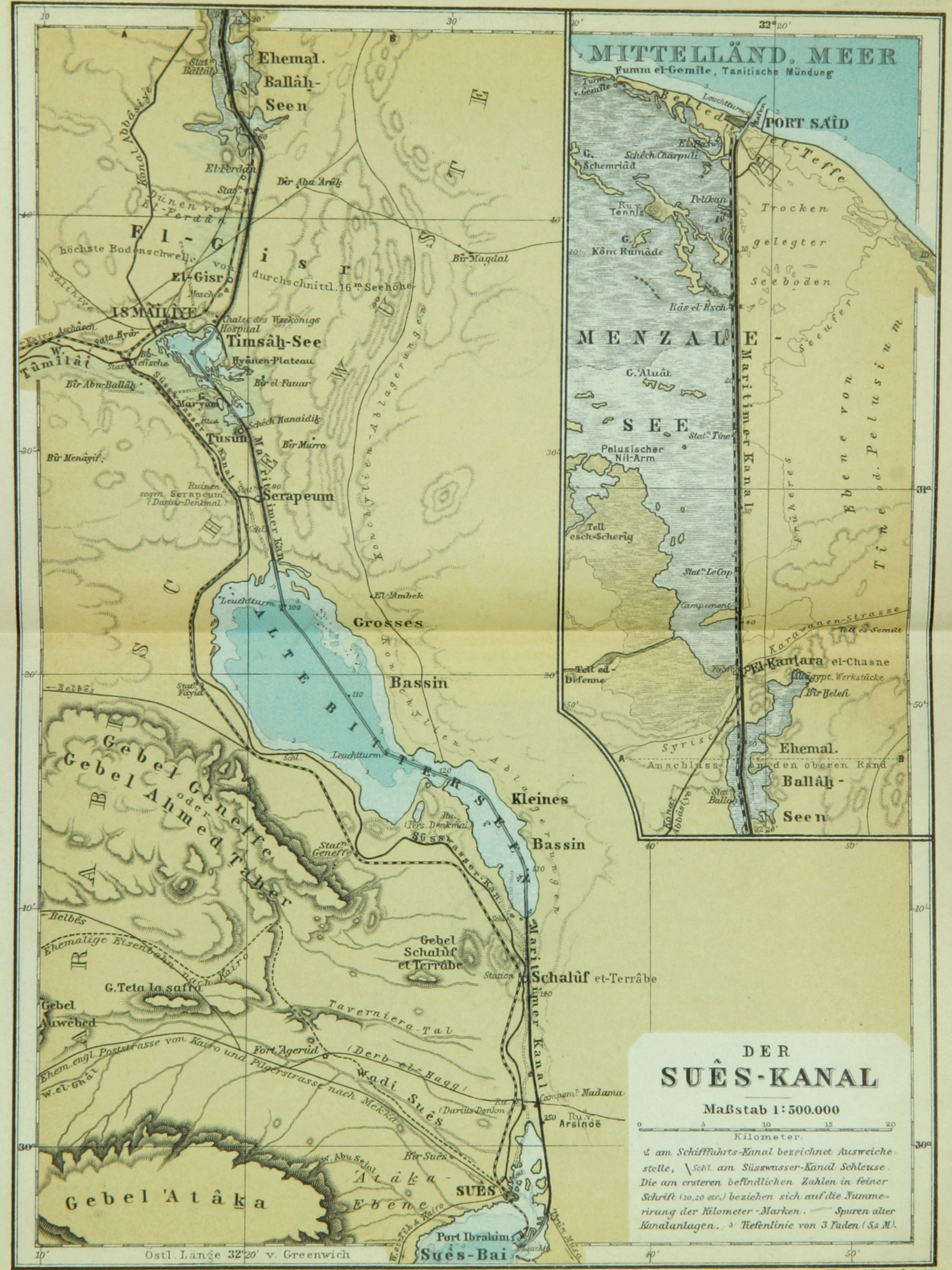
Suez Canal, c. 1914

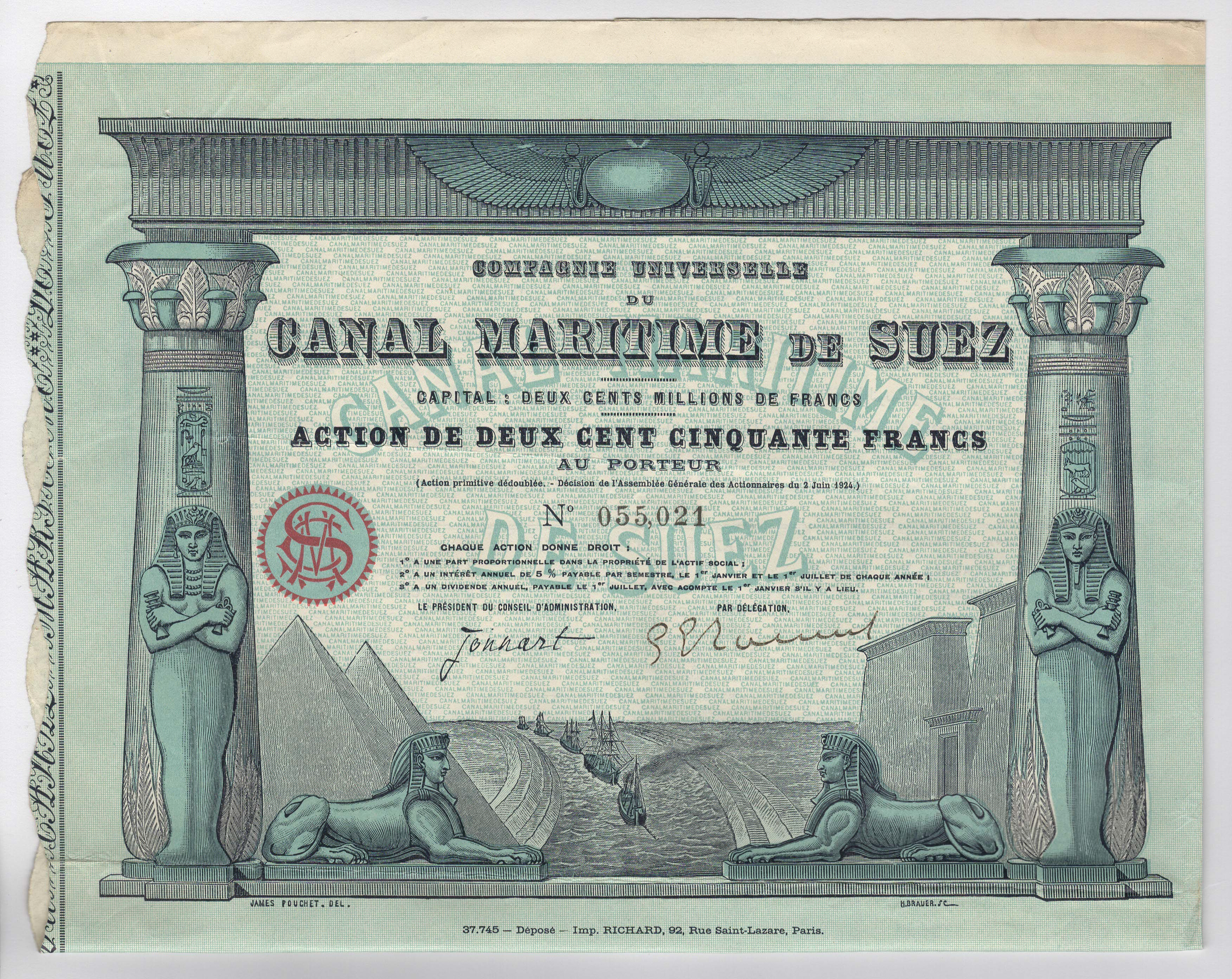
Share of the Comp. Universelle du Canal Maritime de Suez, issued 2 June 1924

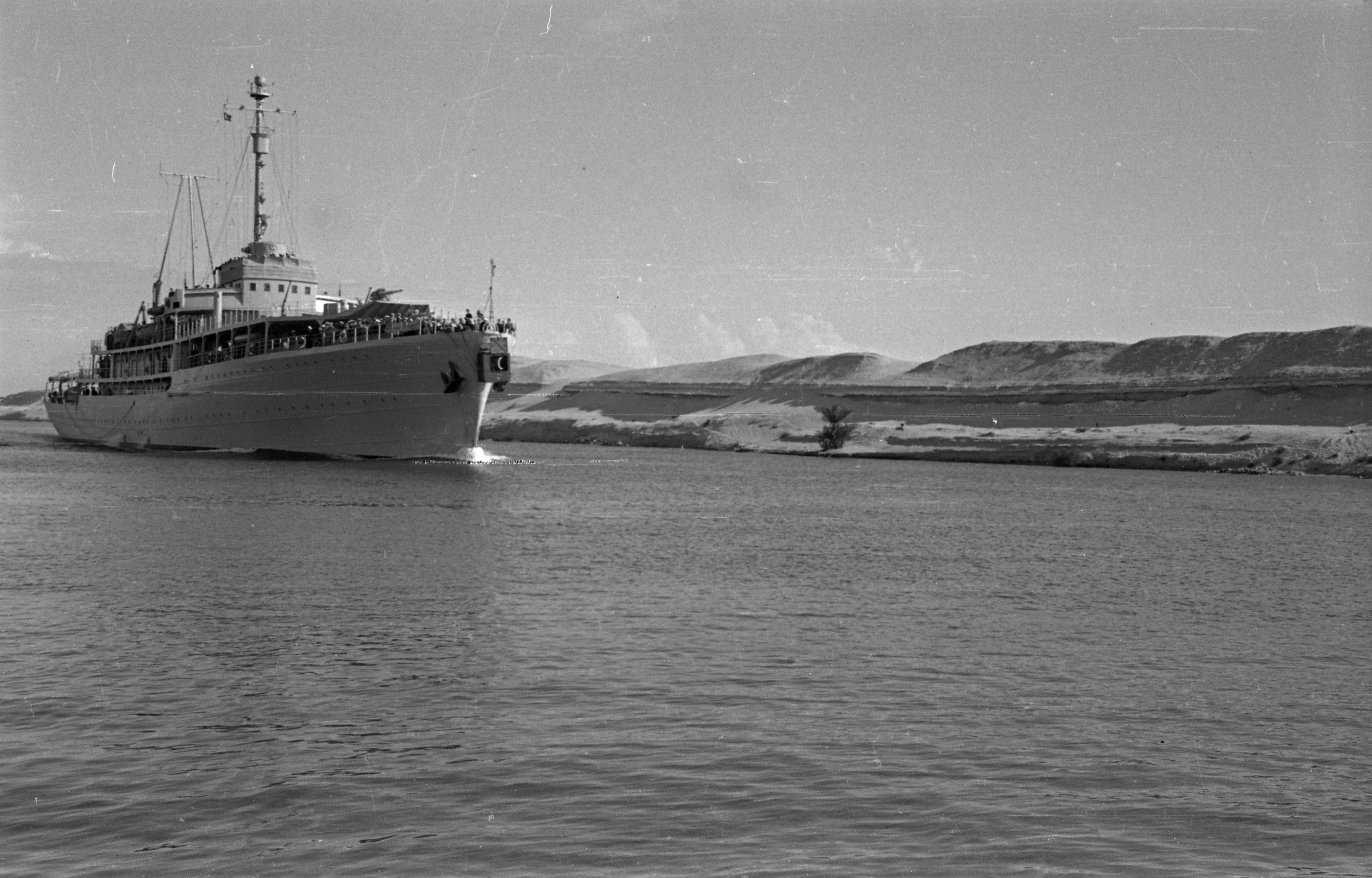
A ship sailing down the Suez Canal in 1955

The canal had an immediate and dramatic effect on world trade. Combined with the American transcontinental railroad completed six months earlier, it allowed the world to be circled in record time. It played an important role in increasing European colonization of Africa. The construction of the canal was one of the reasons for the Panic of 1873 in Great Britain, because goods from the Far East had, until then, been carried in sailing vessels around the Cape of Good Hope and stored in British warehouses. An inability to pay his bank debts led Said Pasha's successor, Isma'il Pasha, in 1875 to sell his 44% share in the canal for £4,000,000 ($19.2 million), equivalent to £432 million to £456 million ($540 million to $570 million) in 2019, to the government of the United Kingdom. French shareholders still held the majority. Local unrest caused the British to invade Egypt in 1882 and take full control, although nominally Egypt remained part of the Ottoman Empire. The British representative from 1883 to 1907 was Evelyn Baring, 1st Earl of Cromer, who reorganized and modernized the government and suppressed rebellions and corruption, thereby facilitating increased traffic on the canal.

The European Mediterranean countries in particular benefited economically from the Suez Canal, as they now had much faster connections to Asia and East Africa than the North and West European maritime trading nations such as Great Britain, the Netherlands or Germany. The biggest beneficiary in the Mediterranean was Austria-Hungary, which had participated in the planning and construction of the canal. The largest Austrian maritime trading company, Österreichischer Lloyd, experienced rapid expansion after the canal was completed, as did the port city of Trieste, then an Austrian possession. The company was a partner in the Compagnie Universelle du Canal de Suez, whose vice-president was the Lloyd co-founder Pasquale Revoltella.

In 1900, a dredging trial was held by the Suez Canal Company to determine which ship would assist in the widening and deepening of the canal. One of the ships trialed in the dredging was The Hercules, a ship owned by the Queensland Government in Australia. The Hercules dredged deposits of granite and limestone, but it was determined at the end of the trial that the Hercules would not be used for the dredging of the Suez Canal. The ship was then returned to Brisbane, Australia in January 1901.

The Convention of Constantinople in 1888 declared the canal a neutral zone under the protection of the British, who had occupied Egypt and Sudan at the request of Khedive Tewfiq to suppress the Urabi Revolt against his rule. The revolt went on from 1879 to 1882. The British defended the strategically important passage against a major Ottoman attack in 1915, during the First World War. Under the Anglo-Egyptian Treaty of 1936, the UK retained control over the canal. With the outbreak of World War II the canal was again strategically important; Britain stationed warships in the Suez Canal and used it to move Allied troops and military supplies, while neutral shipping was limited. In 1942, Axis forces advanced towards the Suez Canal, but Allied forces halted their offensive in July. After the war the British Army continued to maintain a large garrison of some 70,000 troops in the Suez Canal Zone.

=== Suez Crisis ===
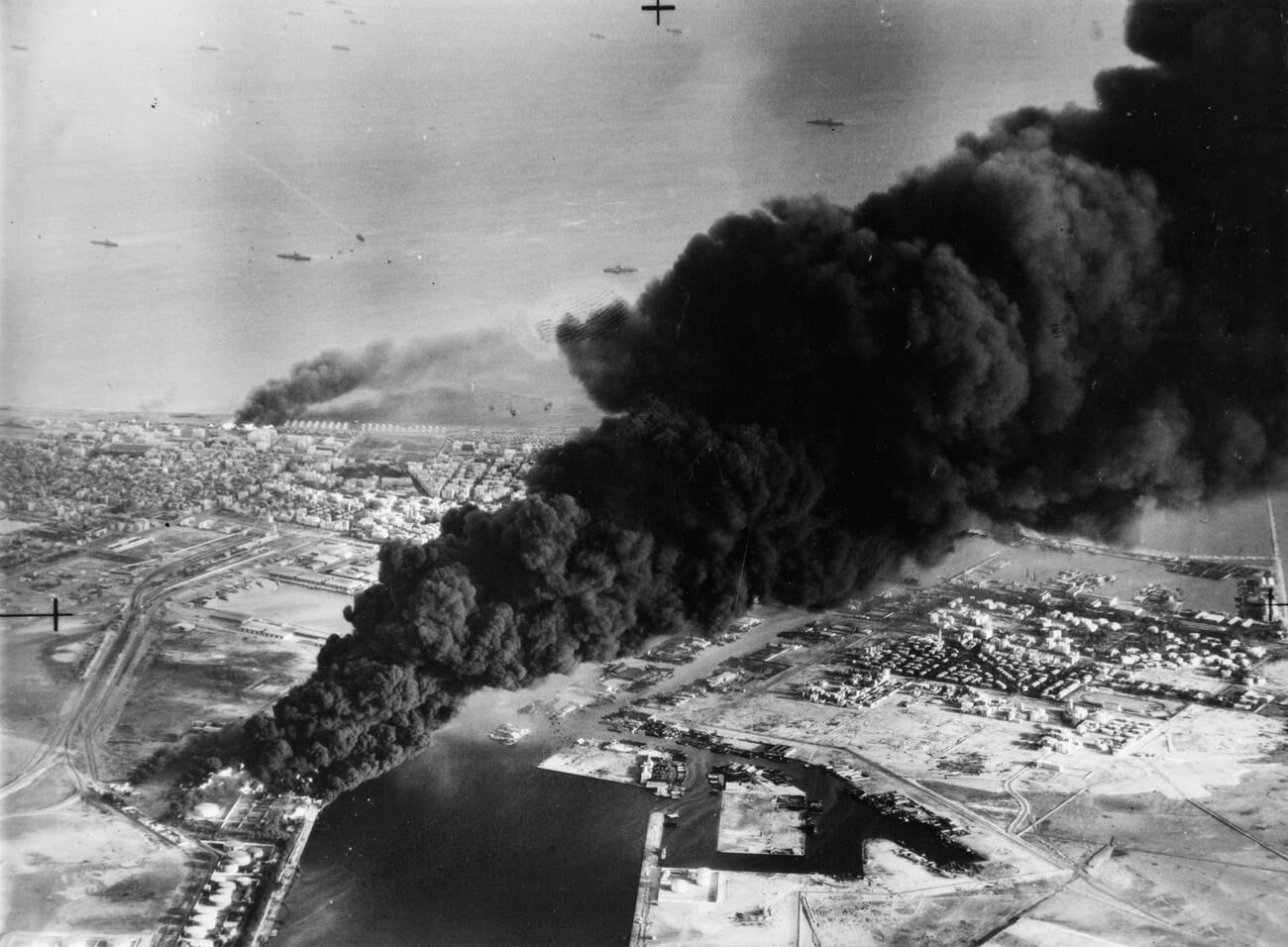
Smoke rises from oil tanks beside the Suez Canal hit during the initial Anglo-French assault on Port Said, 5 November 1956.

In 1951, Egypt repudiated the 1936 treaty with United Kingdom. In October 1954, the United Kingdom tentatively agreed to remove its troops from the Canal Zone. Because of Egyptian overtures towards the Soviet Union, both the United Kingdom and the United States withdrew their pledge to financially support construction of the Aswan Dam. Egyptian President Gamal Abdel Nasser responded by nationalising the canal on 26 July 1956 and transferring it to the Suez Canal Authority, intending to finance the dam project using revenue from the canal. On the same day that the canal was nationalised, Nasser also closed the Straits of Tiran to all Israeli ships. This led to the Suez Crisis in which the UK, France, and Israel invaded Egypt's Sinai. According to the pre-agreed war plans under the Protocol of Sèvres, Israel invaded the Sinai Peninsula on 29 October, forcing Egypt to engage them militarily, and allowing the Anglo-French partnership to declare the resultant fighting a threat to stability in the Middle East and enter the war – officially to separate the two forces but in reality to regain the Canal and bring down the Nasser government.

To save the British from what he thought was a disastrous action and to stop the war from a possible escalation, Canadian Secretary of State for External Affairs Lester B. Pearson proposed the creation of the first United Nations peacekeeping force to ensure access to the canal for all and an Israeli withdrawal from the Sinai Peninsula. In 4 November 1956, a majority at the United Nations voted for Pearson's peacekeeping resolution, which mandated the UN peacekeepers to stay in Sinai unless both Egypt and Israel agreed to their withdrawal. The United States backed this proposal by putting pressure on the British government through the selling of sterling, which would cause it to depreciate. The UK then called a ceasefire, and later agreed to withdraw its troops by the end of the year. Pearson was later awarded the Nobel Peace Prize. As a result of damage and ships sunk under orders from Nasser, the canal was closed from November 1956 to April 1957, when it was cleared with UN assistance. A UN force (UNEF) was established to maintain the free navigability of the canal, and peace in the Sinai Peninsula.

=== Arab–Israeli wars of 1967 and 1973 ===
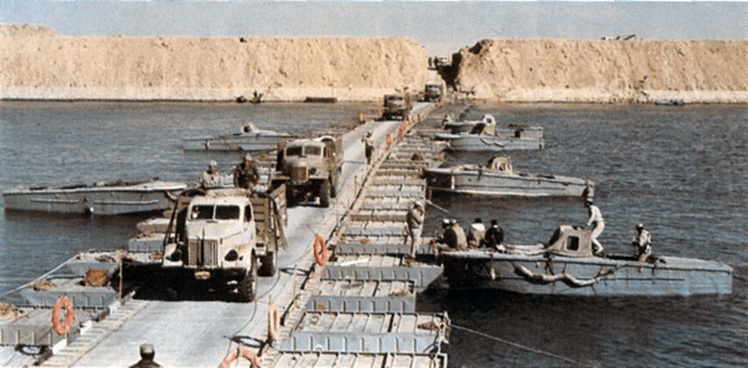
Egyptian vehicles crossing the Suez Canal on 7 October 1973, during the Yom Kippur War

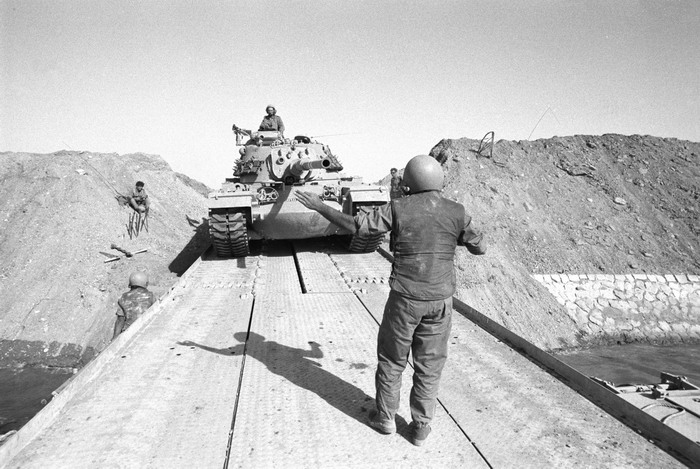
An Israeli M60/Magach tank crosses the Suez Canal, 1973

After the 1948 Arab–Israeli War, Egypt closed the Canal to Israeli shipping, despite UN Security Council resolutions from 1949 and 1951 urging it not to, on the grounds that hostilities had ended with the 1949 armistice agreement.

On 16 May 1967, Nasser ordered UNEF peacekeeping forces out of the Sinai Peninsula, including the Suez Canal area. Egyptian troops were sent into Sinai to take their place. On 21 May, Israel protested Nasser's order to close the Straits of Tiran to Israeli trade.

After the 1967 Six-Day War, Israeli forces occupied the Sinai Peninsula and the Egyptian-administered Gaza Strip, including the entire east bank of the Suez Canal. In the following years, the tensions between Egypt and Israel intensified and from 1967 until August 1970, the War of Attrition took place as the then Egyptian president, Gamal Abdel Nasser, tried to retake the territories occupied by Israel during the conflict. The fighting ceased after the death of Nasser on 28 September 1970. After this conflict, there were no changes in the distribution of territory, but the underlying tensions persisted.

Unwilling to allow the Israelis to use the canal, Egypt imposed a blockade which closed the canal to all shipping immediately after the beginning of the Six-Day War. The canal remained blocked for eight years. There was no anticipation of this event and consequently fifteen cargo ships, known as the "Yellow Fleet", were trapped in the canal, and remained there until its reopening in 1975.

On 6 October 1973, during the start of the Yom Kippur War, the Canal was the scene of Operation Badr, in which the Egyptian army crossed into Israeli-occupied Sinai. Much wreckage from this conflict remains visible along the canal's edges. On 22 October 1973, Israeli forces counter-attacked by crossing the Suez Canal into Egypt and advancing towards Suez City, where they remained until after Israel and Egypt signed on 18 January 1974, an agreement, commonly known as Sinai I, with the official name of Sinai Separation of Forces Agreement, which included a withdrawal of Israeli forces from the western side of the Suez Canal.

=== Mine clearing operations (1974–1975) ===
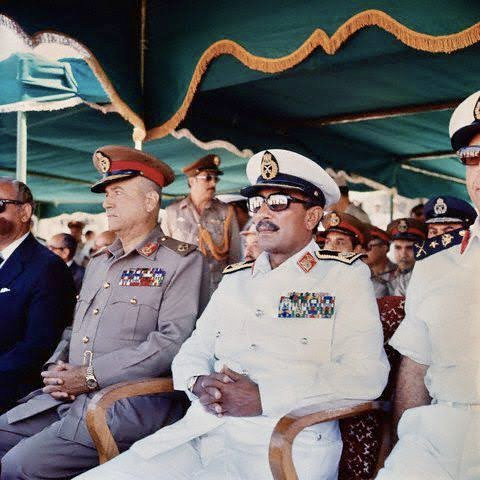
President Anwar Sadat and Minister of Defense Ahmed Ismail in the re-opening of Suez Canal, 5 June 1975

After the Yom Kippur War, the United States initiated Operation Nimbus Moon. The amphibious assault ship USS Inchon (LPH-12) was sent to the Canal, carrying 12 RH-53D minesweeping helicopters from Helicopter Mine Countermeasures Squadron 12. These partly cleared the canal between May and December 1974. It was relieved by the LST USS Barnstable County (LST1197). The British Royal Navy initiated Operation Rheostat and Task Group 65.2 provided for Operation Rheostat One (six months in 1974), the minehunters HMS Maxton, HMS Bossington, and HMS Wilton, the Fleet Clearance Diving Team (FCDT) and HMS Abdiel, a practice minelayer/MCMV support ship; and for Operation Rheostat Two (six months in 1975) the minehunters HMS Hubberston and HMS Sheraton, and HMS Abdiel. When the Canal Clearance Operations were completed, the canal and its lakes were considered 99% clear of mines. The canal was then reopened by Egyptian President Anwar Sadat aboard an Egyptian destroyer, which led the first convoy northbound to Port Said in 1975; at his side stood the Iranian Crown Prince Reza Pahlavi.

=== UN presence ===
The UNEF mandate expired in 1979. Despite the efforts of the United States, Israel, Egypt, and others to obtain an extension of the UN role in observing the peace between Israel and Egypt, as called for under the Egypt–Israel peace treaty of 1979, the mandate could not be extended because of the veto by the Soviet Union in the UN Security Council, at the request of Syria. Accordingly, negotiations for a new observer force in the Sinai produced the Multinational Force and Observers (MFO), stationed in Sinai in 1981 in coordination with a phased Israeli withdrawal. The MFO remains active under agreements between the United States, Israel, Egypt, and other nations.

=== Bypass expansion ===
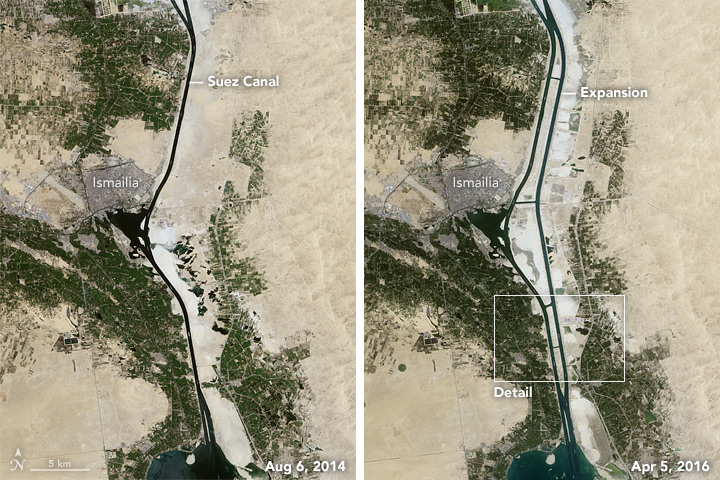
2015 additions to the canal

In 2014, months after taking office as President of Egypt, Abdel Fattah el-Sisi ordered the expansion of the Ballah Bypass from 61 metres (200 ft) wide to 312 metres (1,024 ft) wide for 35 kilometres (22 mi). The project was called the New Suez Canal, as it allows ships to transit the canal in both directions simultaneously. The project cost more than LE 59.4 billion (US$9 billion) and was completed within a year. Sisi declared the expanded channel open to business in a ceremony on 6 August 2015.

The Suez Canal Authority opened the new side channel in 2016. This side channel, at the northern side of the east extension of the Suez Canal, serves the East Terminal for berthing and unberthing vessels from the terminal. As the East Container Terminal is located on the Canal itself, before the construction of the new side channel, it was not possible to berth or unberth vessels at the terminal while a convoy was running.

=== Second channel extension ===
Following the grounding of the vessel Ever Given in 2021, Egypt accelerated plans to extend and widen the canal's second channel. In early 2025, new sections of this extension had begun to be tested, with the Suez Canal Authority reporting two vessels had passed through the canal with no issues.

== Incidents ==
In 2004, the canal was closed for three days when the oil tanker Tropic Brilliance became stuck.

On 18 October 2017, the OOCL Japan ran aground causing an obstruction which blocked the canal for a few hours.

=== 2021 obstruction ===
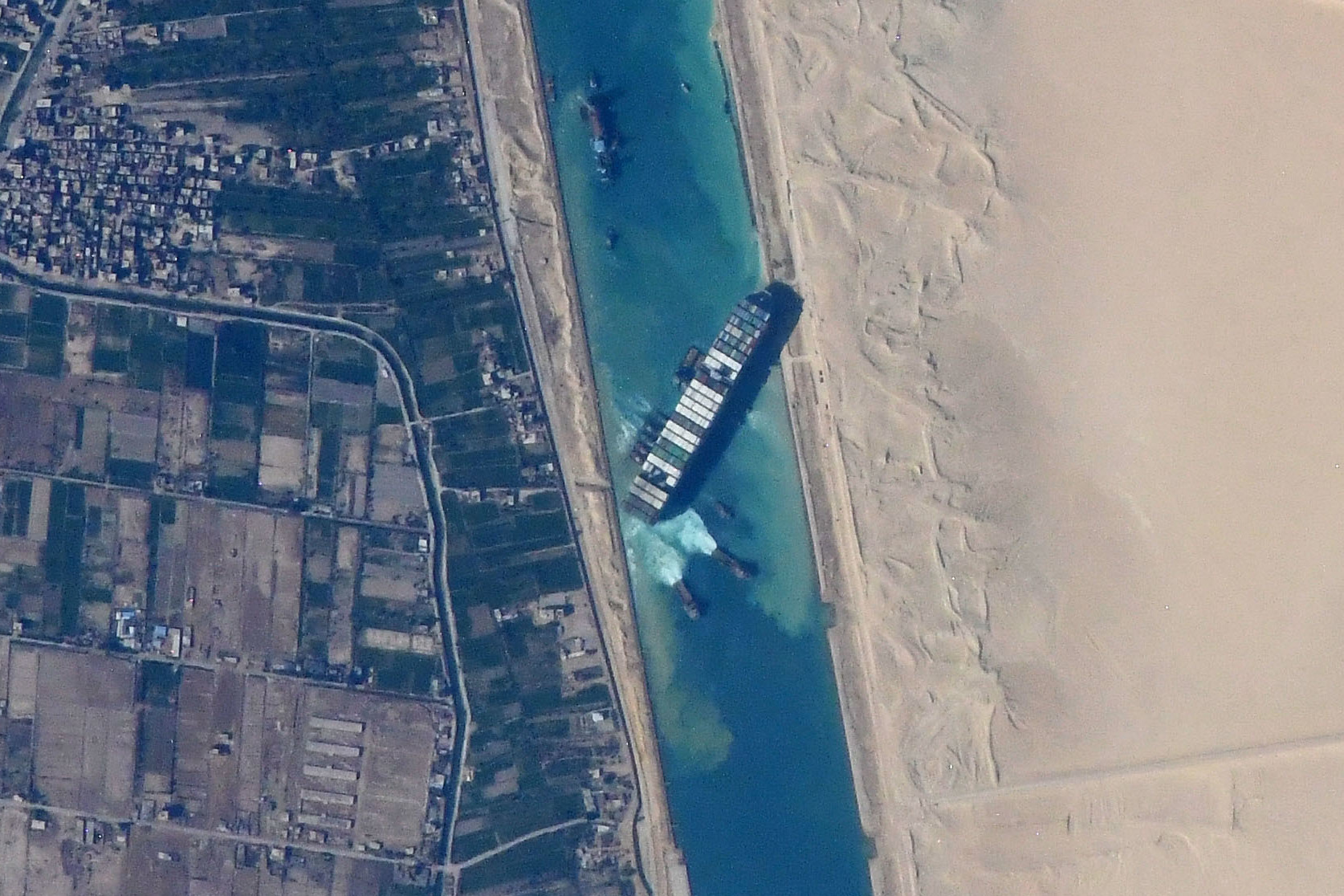
Satellite image of Ever Given blocking the canal in March 2021

On 23 March 2021, at around 05:40 UTC (07:40 local time), the Suez Canal was blocked in both directions by ultra-large Evergreen G-class container ship Ever Given. The ship, operated by Evergreen Marine, was en route from Malaysia to the Netherlands when it ran aground after strong winds allegedly blew the ship off course. Upon running aground, Ever Given turned sideways, completely blocking the canal. Although part of the length of the canal is paralleled by an older, narrower channel which can be used to bypass obstructions, this incident occurred to the south, in a section of the canal where there is only one channel.

When the incident began, many economists and trade experts commented on the effects of the obstruction if not resolved quickly, citing how important the Suez was to global trade; the incident was likely to drastically affect the global economy because of the trapped goods scheduled to go through the canal. Among those goods, oil shipments were the most affected in the immediate aftermath, due to a significant number still blocked with no other way to reach their destination. Referring to the European and American market, a few maritime experts have disputed the prediction of a drastic effect on trade, saying this "really isn't a substantial transit route for crude" according to Marshall Steeves, energy markets analyst at IHS Markit, and "there are existing stocks" according to Camille Egloff of Boston Consulting Group and alternative sources of supply, noting that traffic only slowed down and that it might only have impacted sectors with existing shortages (such as the semiconductor industry). The International Chamber of Shipping (ICS) estimated that up to $3 billion worth of cargo passes through the Suez Canal every day.

It was said the blockage would have an impact on cargo schedules around the world. Shipping companies were also considering whether to divert their ships along the much longer route around the Cape of Good Hope. The first container ship diverted was Ever Given's sister ship, Ever Greet.

Ever Given was re-floated on 29 March. Within a few hours, cargo traffic resumed, slowly resolving the backlog of around 450 ships. The first ship to pass through the canal after Ever Given's recovery was YM Wish, a Hong Kong-based cargo ship.

On 2 April 2021, Usama Rabie, chairman of the Suez Canal Authority of Egypt, said that the damage caused by the blockage of the canal could reach about $1 billion. Rabie also revealed that after the Suez Canal resumed navigation, as of noon on 31 March, 285 cargo ships had passed through the canal smoothly. He said that the remaining 175 freighters waiting to pass through the canal would all pass by 2 April.

After the incident, the Egyptian government announced that they would be widening the narrower parts of the canal. On 9 September 2021, the canal was briefly blocked again by MV Coral Crystal. However, this ship was freed within 15 minutes, presenting minimal disruption to other convoys.

=== 2023 grounding ===
On 25 May 2023, a Hong Kong-flagged cargo ship, MV Xin Hai Tong 23, was grounded near the southern end of the canal, but it was refloated by tugboats in less than a day.

== Layout and operation ==
When built, the canal was 164 km (102 mi) long and 8 m (26 ft) deep. After several enlargements, it is 193.30 km (120 1/8 mi) long, 24 m (79 ft) deep and 205 m (673 ft) wide. It consists of the northern access channel of 22 km (14 mi), the canal itself of 162.25 km (100 7/8 mi) and the southern access channel of 9 km (5 1/2 mi).

The so-called New Suez Canal, functional since 6 August 2015, currently has a new parallel canal in the middle part, with its length over 35 kilometres (22 mi). The current parameters of the Suez Canal, including both individual canals of the parallel section are: depth 23 to 24 m (75 to 79 ft) and width at least 205 to 225 m (673 to 738 ft) (that width measured at 11 m (36 ft) of depth).

=== Capacity ===
The canal allows passage of ships up to 20 m (66 ft) draft or 240,000 deadweight tons and up to a height of 68 m (223 ft) above water level and a maximum beam of 77.5 m (254 ft) under certain conditions. The canal can handle more traffic and larger ships than the Panama Canal, as Suezmax dimensions are greater than both Panamax and New Panamax. Some supertankers are too large to traverse the canal. Others can offload part of their cargo onto a canal-owned ship to reduce their draft, transit, and reload at the other end of the canal. On 15 April 2021 Egyptian authorities announced that they would widen the southern section of the Suez Canal to improve the efficiency of the canal. The plan mainly covers about 30 kilometres (19 mi) from Suez to the Great Bitter Lake. It will be widened by 40 metres (130 ft) and the maximum depth will be increased from about 20 metres (66 ft) to about 22 metres (72 ft).

=== Navigation ===
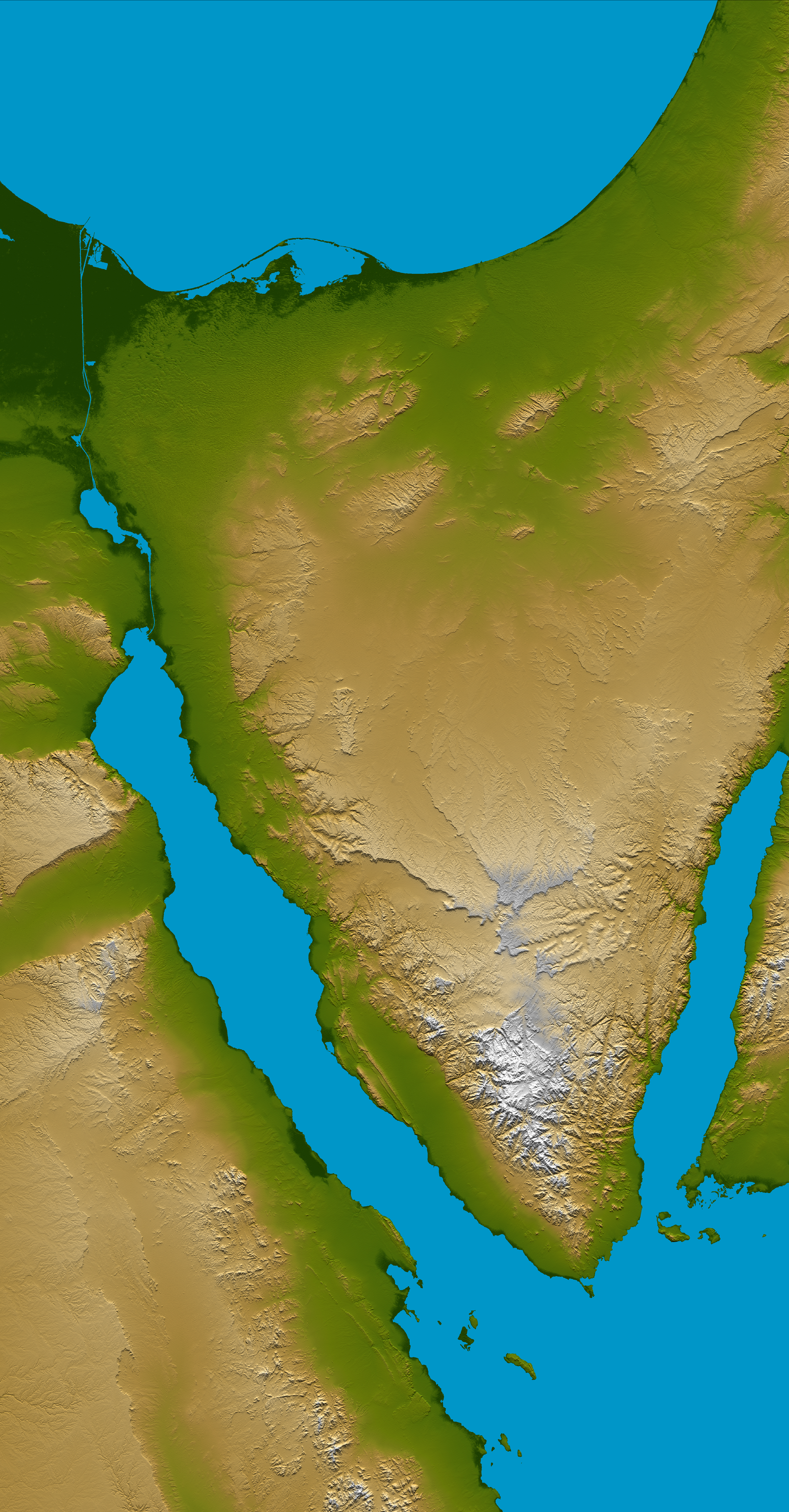
Topographic map showing the Suez Canal

Ships approaching the canal from the sea are expected to radio the harbour when they are within 15 nautical miles (28 kilometres) of the Fairway Buoy near Port Said. The canal has no locks because of the flat terrain, and the minor sea level difference between each end is inconsequential for shipping. As the canal has no sea surge gates, the ports at the ends would be subject to the sudden impact of tsunamis from the Mediterranean Sea and Red Sea, according to a 2012 article in the Journal of Coastal Research.

There is one shipping lane with passing areas in Ballah-Bypass near El Qantara and in the Great Bitter Lake. On a typical day, three convoys transit the canal, two southbound and one northbound. The passage takes between 11 and 16 hours at a speed of around 8 knots (15 km/h; 9 mph). The low speed helps prevent erosion of the banks by ships' wakes.

By 1955, about two-thirds of Europe's oil passed through the canal. Around 8% of world sea trade is carried via the canal. In 2008, 21,415 vessels passed through the canal and the receipts totalled $5.381 billion, with an average cost per ship of $251,000.

New Rules of Navigation came into force on 1 January 2008, passed by the board of directors of the Suez Canal Authority (SCA) to organise vessels' transit. The most important amendments include allowing vessels with 19-metre (62 ft) draught to pass, increasing the allowed breadth from 32 to 40 metres (105 to 131 ft) (following improvement operations), and imposing a fine on vessels using pilots from outside the SCA inside the canal boundaries without permission. The amendments allow vessels loaded with dangerous cargo (such as radioactive or flammable materials) to pass if they conform with the latest amendments provided by international conventions.

The SCA has the right to determine the number of tugs required to assist warships traversing the canal, to achieve the highest degree of safety during transit.

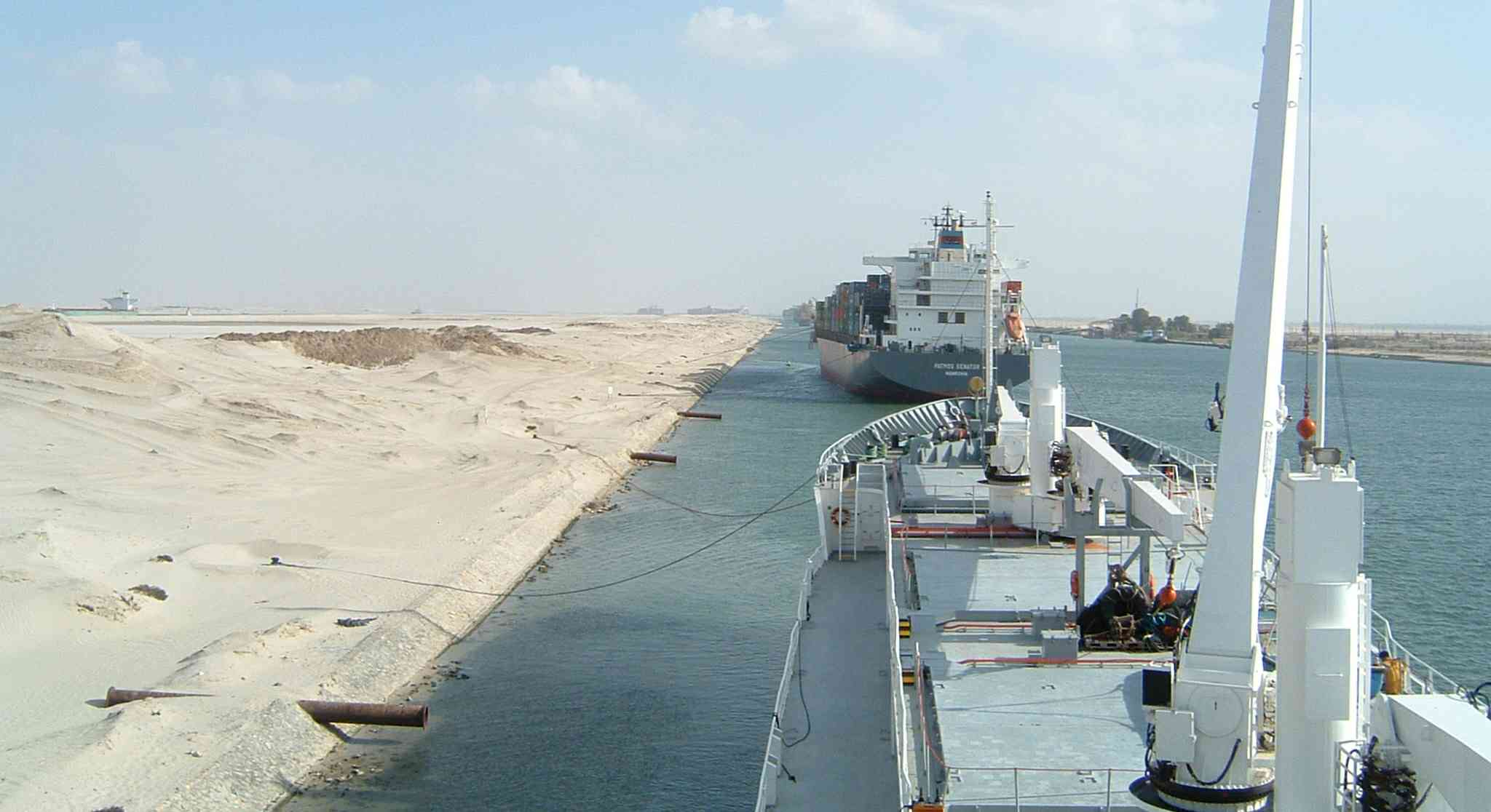
Ships moored at El Ballah during transit

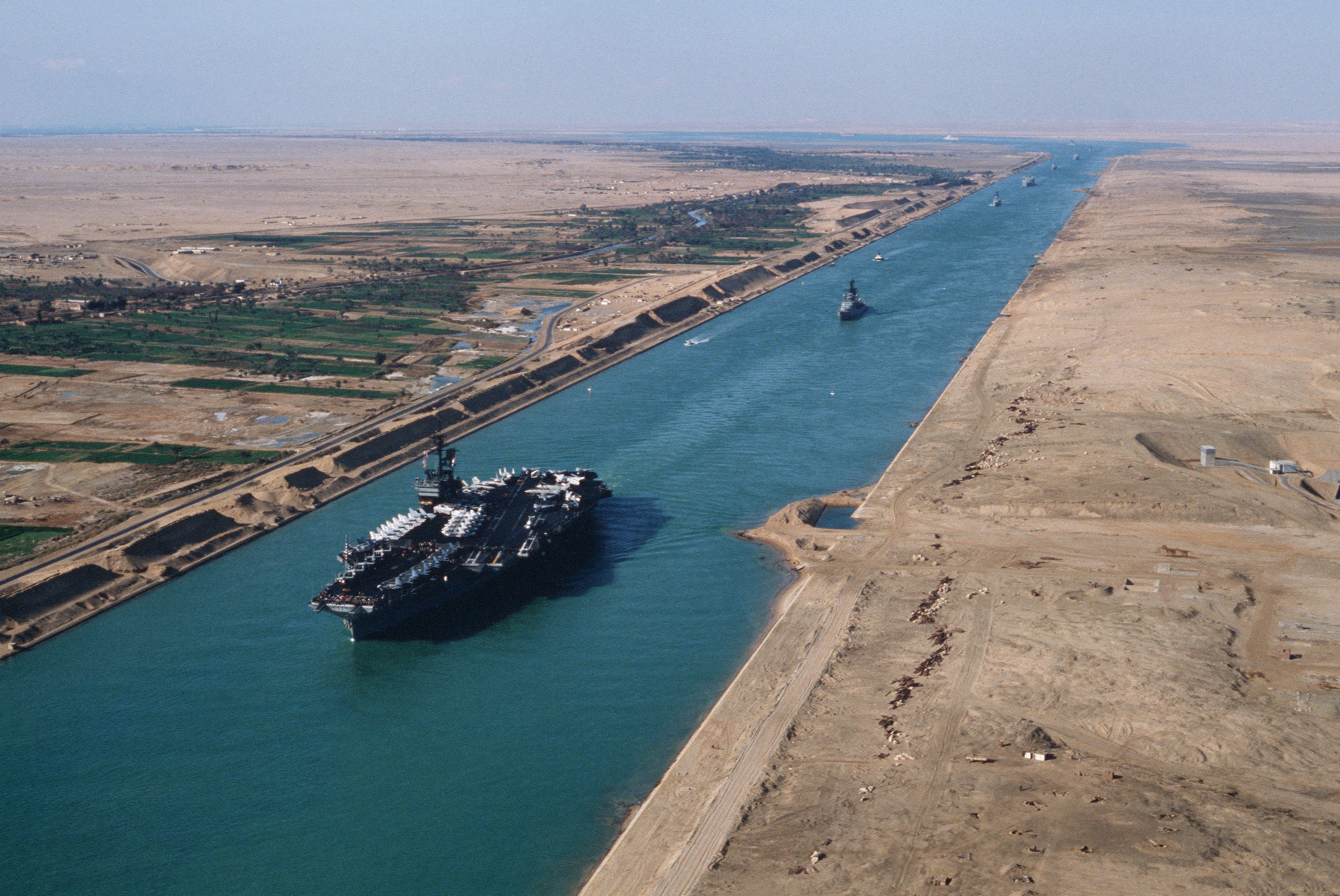
USS America (CV-66), an American aircraft carrier in the Suez Canal

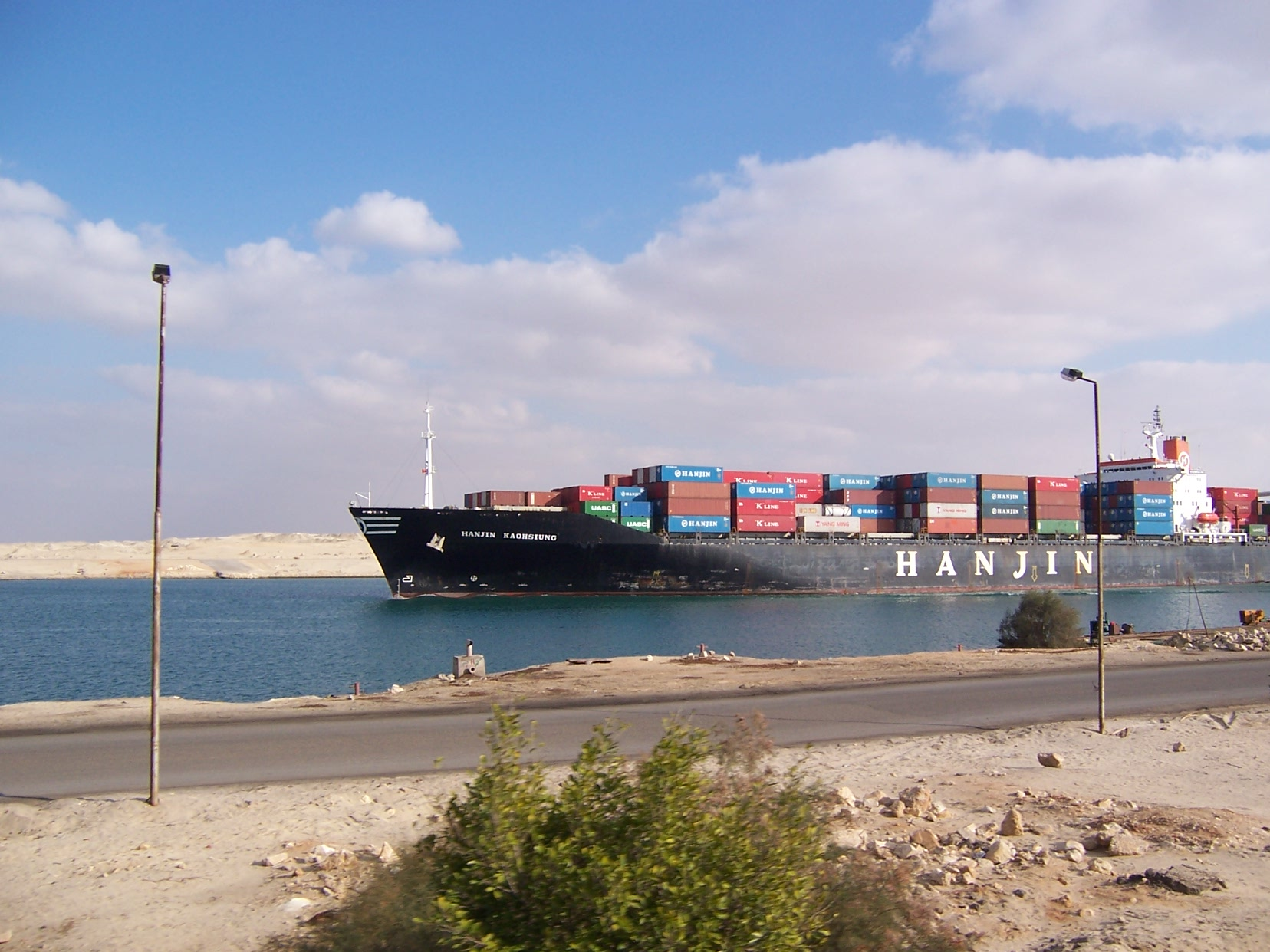
Container ship Hanjin Kaohsiung transiting the Suez Canal

=== Operation ===
Before August 2015, the canal was too narrow for free two-way traffic, so ships had to pass in convoys and use bypasses. The bypasses were 78 km (48 mi) out of 193 km (120 mi) (40%). From north to south, they are Port Said bypass (entrances) 36.5 km (23 mi), Ballah bypass & anchorage 9 km (6 mi), Timsah bypass 5 km (3 mi), and the Deversoir bypass (northern end of the Great Bitter Lake) 27.5 kilometres (17 mi). The bypasses were completed in 1980.

Typically, it would take a ship 12 to 16 hours to transit the canal. The canal's 24-hour capacity was about 76 standard ships.

In August 2014, Egypt chose a consortium that includes the Egyptian army and global engineering firm Dar Al-Handasah to develop an international industrial and logistics hub in the Suez Canal area, and began the construction of a new canal section from 60 to 95 km (37 to 59 mi) combined with expansion and deep digging of the other 37 km (23 mi) of the canal. This has allowed navigation in both directions simultaneously in the 72-kilometre-long (45 mi) central section of the canal. These extensions were formally opened on 6 August 2015 by President Al-Sisi.

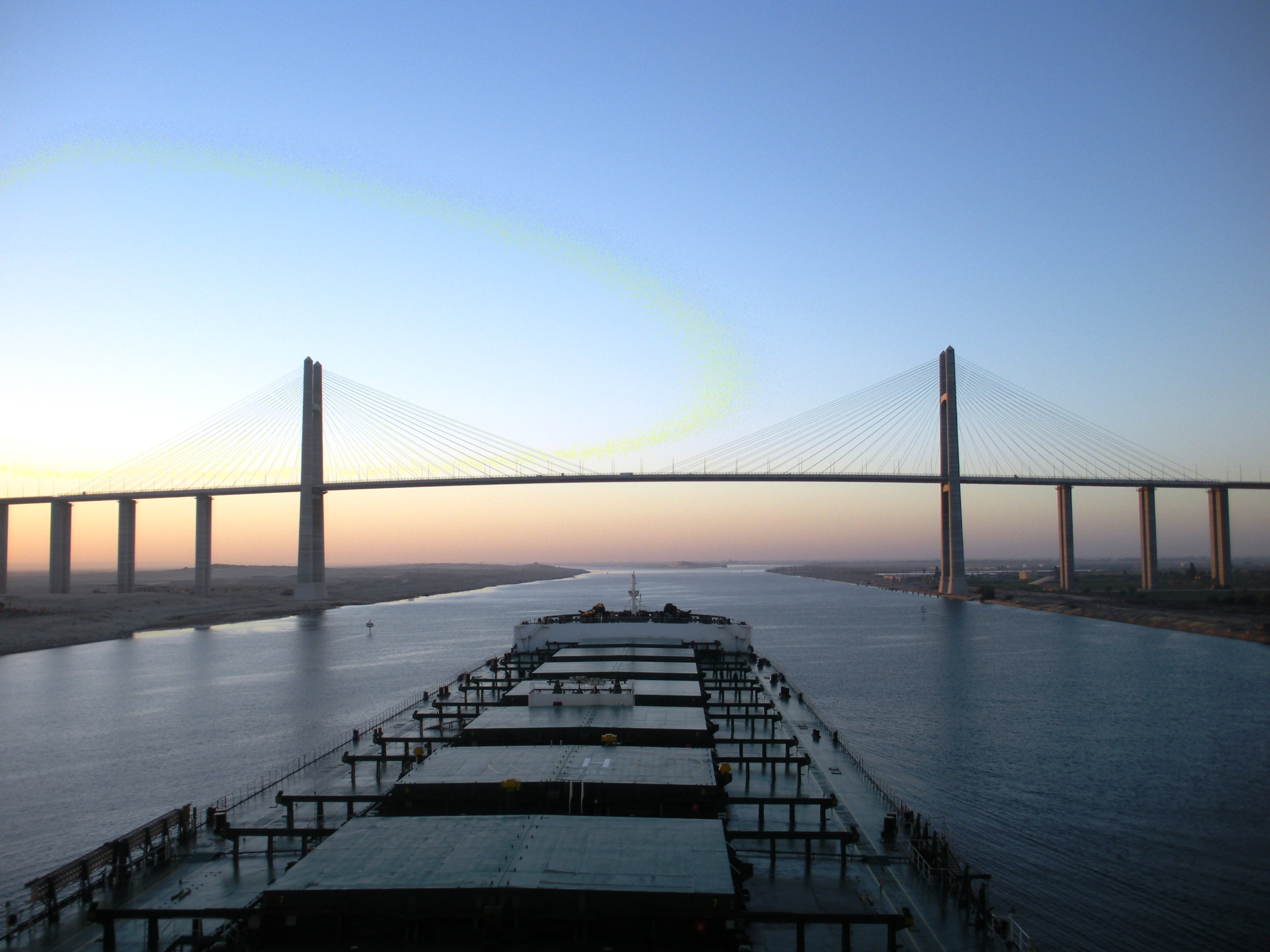
Post-deepening, a capesize bulk carrier approaches the Friendship Bridge

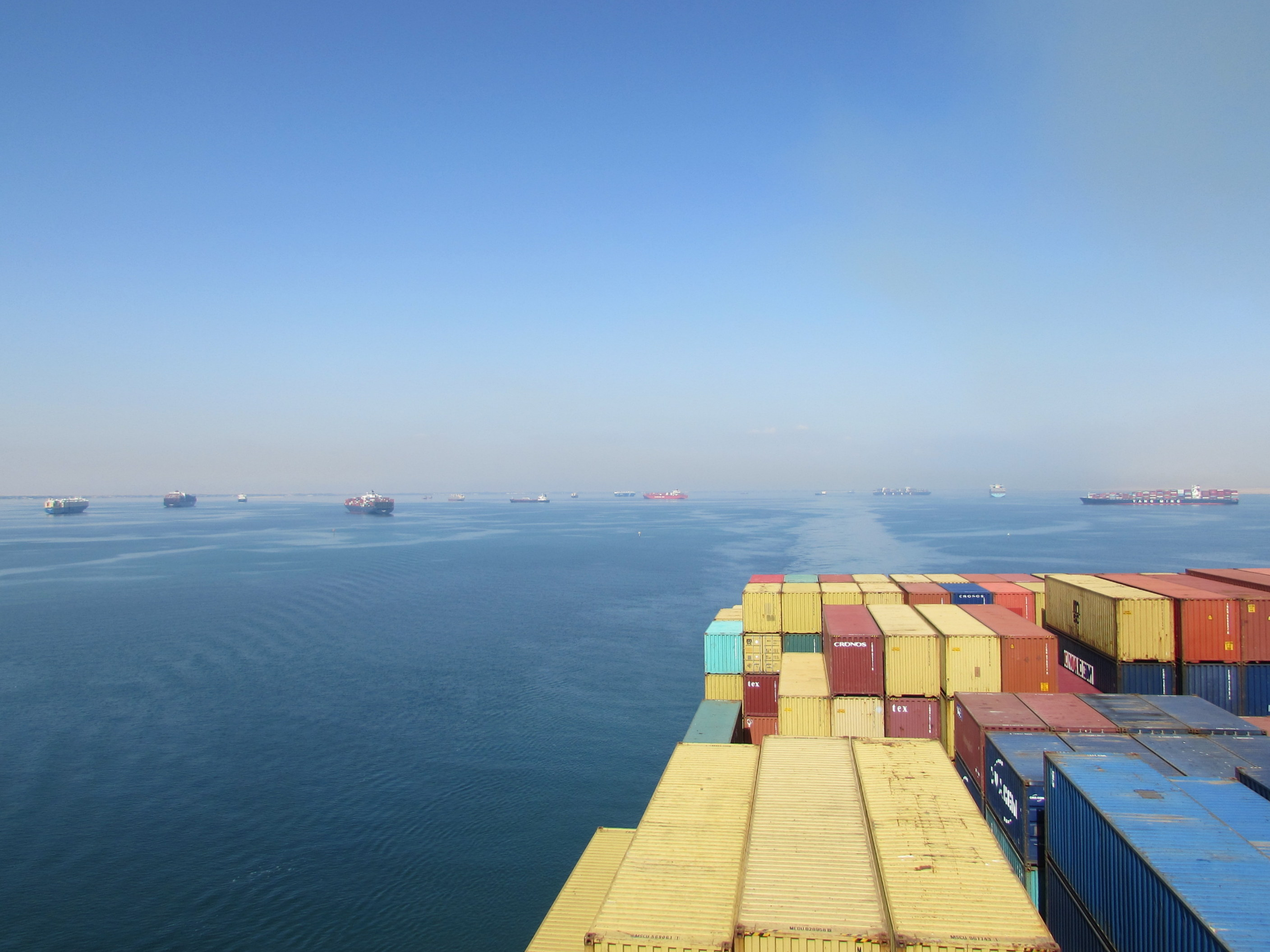
Northbound convoy waits in the Great Bitter Lake as southbound convoy passes, October 2014

=== Convoy sailing ===
Since the canal does not cater to unregulated two-way traffic, all ships transit in convoys on regular times, scheduled on a 24-hour basis. Each day, a single northbound convoy starts at 04:00 EET from Suez. At dual lane sections, the convoy uses the eastern route. Synchronised with this convoy's passage is the southbound convoy. It starts at 03:30 EET from Port Said and so passes the Northbound convoy in the two-lane section.

=== Canal crossings ===
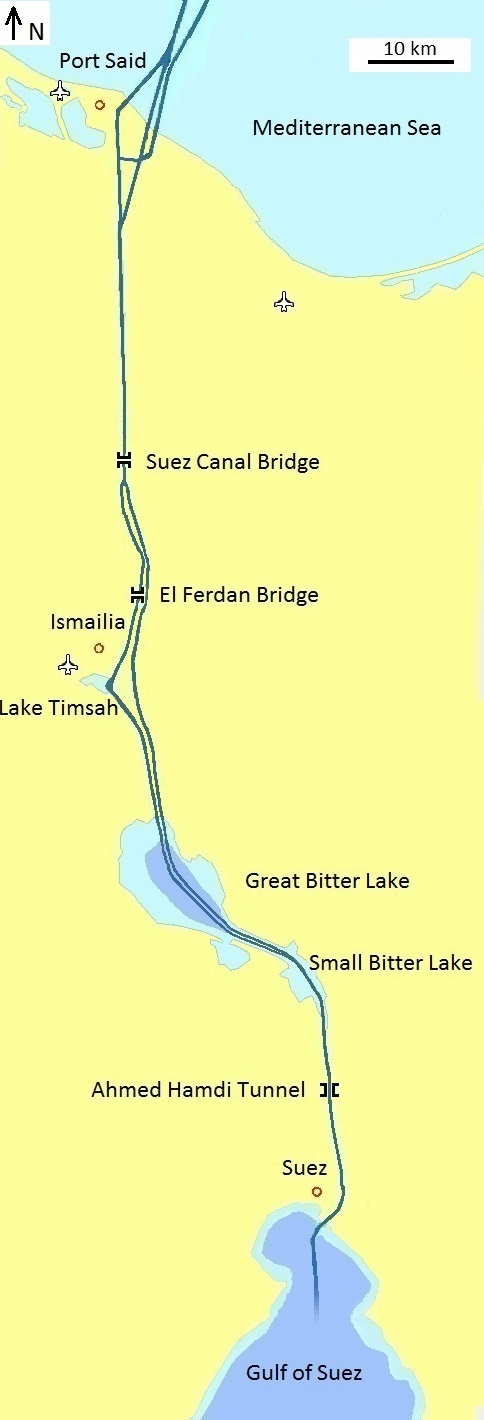
The canal in 2015

From north to south, the crossings are:

- The El Nasr pontoon bridge (31.2285°N 32.3042°E), connecting Port Said to Port Fuad. Opened in 2016, 420 m (1,380 ft) length.
- The Abanoub Gerges pontoon bridge (30.8436°N 32.3168°E), 1.5 km (1 mi) north of the Suez Canal Bridge
- The Suez Canal Bridge (30.828248°N 32.317572°E), also called the Egyptian-Japanese Friendship Bridge, a high-level road bridge at El Qantara. In Arabic, al qantara means "arch". Opened in 2001, it has a 70-metre (230 ft) clearance over the canal and was built with assistance from the Japanese government and by Kajima.
- El Ferdan Railway Bridge (30.657°N 32.334°E) 20 km (12 mi) north of Ismailia (30°35′N 32°16′E) was completed in 2001 and is the longest swing-span bridge in the world, with a span of 340 m (1100 ft). The previous bridge was destroyed in 1967 during the Arab-Israeli conflict. The current bridge is no longer functional due to the expansion of the Suez Canal, as the parallel shipping lane completed in 2015 just east of the bridge lacks a structure spanning it. However, plans surfaced in 2017 to build a new bridge spanning the parallel canal and converting the old single track railway on the Ferdan to a double track, which as of October 2023, were near completion.
- The Ahmed el-Mansy pontoon bridge (30.6054°N 32.3254°E), a pair of pontoons bridging both channels
- The Taha Zaki Abdullah pontoon bridge (30.4729°N 32.3502°E), a pair of pontoons bridging both channels
- Pipelines taking fresh water under the canal to Sinai, about 57 km (35 mi) north of Suez, at 30°27.3′N 32°21.0′E.
- Ahmed Hamdi Tunnel (30°5′9″N 32°34′32″E) south of the Great Bitter Lake (30°20′N 32°23′E) was built in 1983. Because of leakage problems, a new water-tight tunnel was built inside the old one from 1992 to 1995.
- The Ahmed Omar Shabrawy pontoon bridge (30.0453°N 32.5744°E)
- The Suez Canal overhead powerline crossing (29.996°N 32.583°E) was built in 1999.

A railway on the west bank runs parallel to the canal for its entire length.

The five pontoon bridges were opened between 2016 and 2019. They are designed to be movable, and can be completely rotated against the banks of the canal to allow shipping through, or else individual sections can be moved to create a narrower channel.

Six new tunnels for cars and trains are also planned across the canal. Currently the Ahmed Hamdi is the only tunnel connecting Suez to the Sinai.

== Economic impact ==
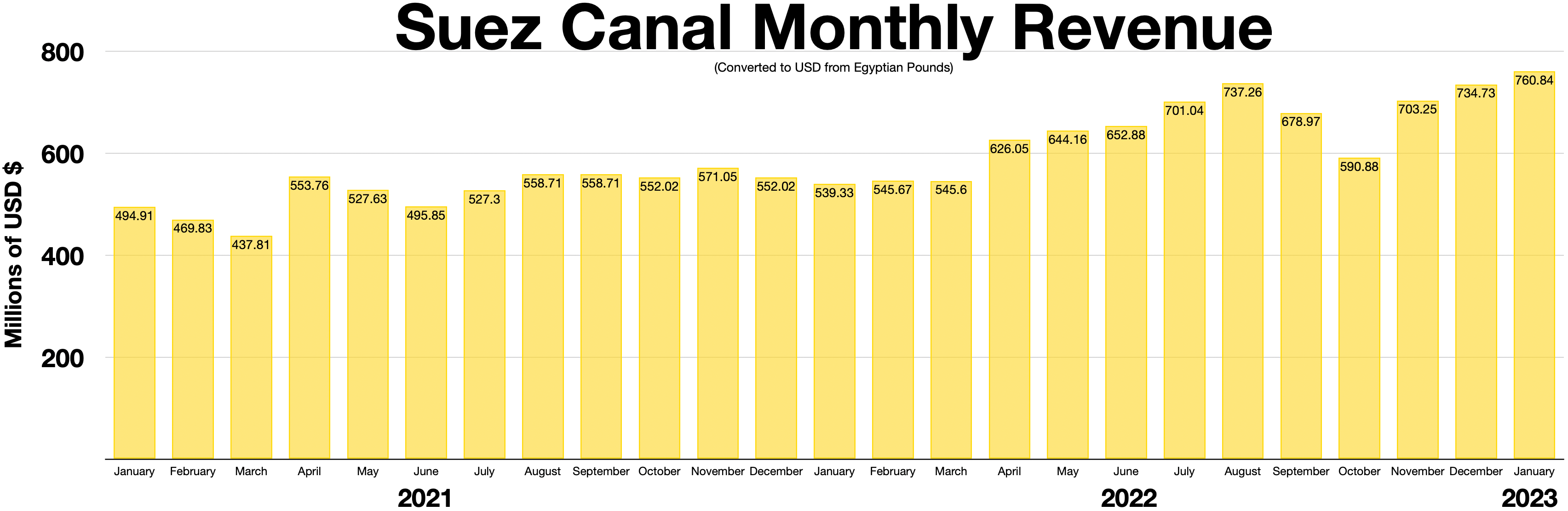
Suez Canal monthly revenue in USD

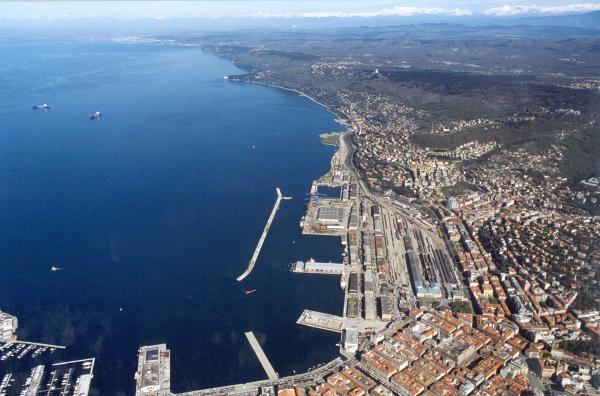
The old port of Trieste, one of the economic hubs in the 19th century

Economically, after its completion, the Suez Canal benefited primarily the sea trading powers of the Mediterranean countries, which now had much faster connections to the Near and Far East than the North and West European sea trading nations such as Great Britain or Germany. The main Habsburg trading port of Trieste with its direct connections to Central Europe experienced a meteoric rise at that time.

The time saved in the 19th century for an assumed steamship trip to Bombay from Brindisi and Trieste was 37 days, from Genoa 32, from Marseille 31, from Bordeaux, Liverpool, London, Amsterdam and Hamburg 24 days. At that time, it was also necessary to consider whether the goods to be transported could bear the costly canal tariff. This led to a rapid growth of Mediterranean ports with their land routes to Central and Eastern Europe. According to today's information from the shipping companies, the route from Singapore to Rotterdam through the Suez Canal will be shortened by 6,000 kilometres (3,700 mi) and thus by nine days compared to the route around Africa. As a result, liner services between Asia and Europe save 44 per cent CO_{2} (carbon dioxide) thanks to this shorter route. The Suez Canal has a correspondingly important role in the connection between East Africa and the Mediterranean region.

In the 20th century, trade through the Suez Canal came to a standstill several times, due to the two world wars and the Suez Canal crisis. Many trade flows were also shifted away from Mediterranean ports towards Northern European terminals, such as Hamburg and Rotterdam. Only after the end of the Cold War, the growth in European economic integration, the consideration of CO_{2} emissions and the Chinese Silk Road Initiative, are Mediterranean ports such as Piraeus and Trieste again at the focus of growth and investment.

The Suez Canal set a new record with annual revenue of $9.4 billion in USD for the fiscal year that ended 30 June 2023. Attacks by Houthi rebels on shipping vessels off the coast of Yemen caused monthly losses of $800 million, according to Egypt's President Sisi.

== Alternative routes ==
Before the canal's opening in 1869, goods were sometimes offloaded from ships and carried overland between the Mediterranean and the Red Sea.

=== Cape Agulhas ===
The main alternative is around Cape Agulhas, the southernmost point of Africa, commonly referred to as the Cape of Good Hope route. This was the only sea route before the canal was constructed, and when the canal was closed. It is still the only route for ships that are too large for the canal. In the early 21st century, the Suez Canal has suffered from diminished traffic due to piracy in Somalia, with many shipping companies choosing to take the long route instead. Between 2008 and 2010, it is estimated that the canal lost 10% of traffic due to the threat of piracy, and another 10% due to the 2008 financial crisis. An oil tanker going from Saudi Arabia to the United States has 4,345 km (2,700 mi) farther to go when taking the route south of Africa rather than the canal.

=== Northern Sea Route ===
A graphical comparison between the Northern Sea Route (blue) and an alternative route through Suez Canal (red)

In recent years, the shrinking Arctic sea ice has made the Northern Sea Route feasible for commercial cargo ships between Europe and East Asia during a six-to-eight-week window in the summer months, shortening the voyage by thousands of kilometres compared to that through the Suez Canal. According to polar climate researchers, as the extent of the Arctic summer ice pack recedes the route will become passable without the help of icebreakers for a greater period each summer.

The Bremen-based Beluga Group claimed in 2009 to be the first Western company to attempt using the Northern Sea Route without assistance from icebreakers, cutting 6,400 kilometres (4,000 mi) off the journey between Ulsan, Korea and Rotterdam, the Netherlands.

=== Cape Horn ===
Sailing ships, such as the windjammers in the heyday of the Great Grain Race between Australia and Europe during the 1930s, often preferred the Cape Horn route when going to Europe, due to prevalent wind directions, even though it is slightly longer from Sydney to Europe this way than past Cape Agulhas.

=== Negev desert railway ===
In February 2012, Israel announced its intention to construct a railway between the Mediterranean and Eilat through the Negev desert to compete with the canal. By 2019, the project had been put on indefinite hold.

=== Iraq–Europe Development Road ===
First envisioned in the 1980s, an ongoing infrastructure project nicknamed the Dry Canal seeks to turn Iraq into an international transit hub. The project includes creating corridors that link the southern coastal province of Basra and the Grand Faw Port and several other provinces of Iraq with Turkey and further extend into Europe. Once finished, it will serve as an alternative route for international freight traffic. It was first introduced in the 1980s, but domestic issues, sanctions and wars hindered its implementation. Recent improvements in security and economic growth have allowed Iraq to revive the project, and since 2023, the country has made significant strides in implementing the project. In 2025, a pilot operation designed to test the feasibility of the project was conducted; a fully inland operation beginning from Poland and traversing through Turkey and Iraq and reaching its destination in the UAE. According to the operator, the journey was completed securely in under a week, significantly less than a multimodal operation via the Red Sea, which would have (under normal circumstances) taken 21 days.

== Environmental impact ==
The opening of the canal created the first salt-water passage between the Mediterranean Sea and the Red Sea. Although the Red Sea is about 1.2 m (4 ft) higher than the eastern Mediterranean, the current between the Mediterranean and the middle of the canal at the Bitter Lakes flows north in winter and south in summer. The current south of the Bitter Lakes is tidal, varying with the tide at Suez. The Bitter Lakes, which were hypersaline natural lakes, blocked the migration of Red Sea species into the Mediterranean for many decades, but as the salinity of the lakes gradually equalised with that of the Red Sea the barrier to migration was removed, and plants and animals from the Red Sea have begun to colonise the eastern Mediterranean.

The Red Sea is generally saltier and less nutrient-rich than the Mediterranean, so that Erythrean species will often do well in the 'milder' eastern Mediterranean environment. To the contrary very few Mediterranean species have been able to settle in the 'harsher' conditions of the Red Sea. The dominant, south to north, migratory passage across the canal is often called Lessepsian migration (after Ferdinand de Lesseps) or "Erythrean invasion". The recent construction by the Egyptian government of a major canal extension – allowing for two-way traffic in the central section of the canal and finally implemented in 2015 – raised concerns from marine biologists, who fear that it will enhance the arrival of Red Sea species in the Mediterranean.

Exotic species from the Indo-Pacific Ocean and introduced into the Mediterranean via the canal since the 1880s have become a significant component of the Mediterranean ecosystem. They already impact its ecology, endangering some local and endemic species. Since the piercing of the canal, over a thousand species from the Red Sea—plankton, seaweeds, invertebrates, fishes—have been recorded in the Mediterranean, and many others will clearly follow. The resulting change in biodiversity is without precedent in human memory and is accelerating: a long-term cross-Basin survey engaged by the Mediterranean Science Commission recently documented that in the first twenty years of this century more exotic fish species from the Indian Ocean had reached the Mediterranean than during the entire 20th century.

Historically, the construction of the canal was preceded by cutting a small fresh-water canal called Sweet Water Canal from the Nile delta along Wadi Tumilat to the future canal, with a southern branch to Suez and a northern branch to Port Said. Completed in 1863, these brought fresh water to a previously arid area, initially for canal construction, and subsequently facilitating growth of agriculture and settlements along the canal. However the Aswan High Dam construction across the Nile, which started operating in 1968, much reduced the inflow of freshwater and cut all natural nutrient-rich silt entering the eastern Mediterranean at the Nile Delta.

== Suez Canal Economic Zone ==
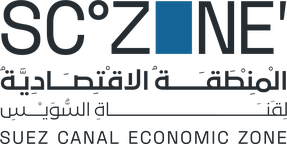
Suez Canal Economic Zone (SCZONE)

The Suez Canal Economic Zone, sometimes shortened to SCZONE, describes the set of locations neighbouring the canal where customs rates have been reduced to zero in order to attract investment. The zone comprises over 461 km^{2} (178 sq mi) within the governorates of Port Said, Ismailia and Suez. Projects in the zone are collectively described as the Suez Canal Area Development Project (SCADP).

The plan focuses on development of East Port Said and the port of Ain Sokhna, and hopes to extend to four more ports at West Port Said, El-Adabiya, Arish and El Tor.

The zone incorporates the four "Qualifying Industrial Zones" at Port Said, Ismailia and Suez, a 1996 American initiative to encourage economic ties between Israel and its neighbours.

== See also ==
- Bab-el-Mandeb — strait on the southern end of the Red Sea
- Canal des Deux Mers
- Container transport
- Construction industry in Egypt
- Corinth Canal
- Indo-Mediterranean
- Istanbul Canal
- Maritime Silk Road
- Mediterranean–Dead Sea Canal
- New Imperialism
- New Suez Canal
- Panama Canal
- Red Sea–Dead Sea Water Conveyance
- Suezmax
- Qantara Sharq
- Yellow Fleet

== Bibliography ==
- Bogaars, George. "The Effect of the Opening of the Suez Canal on the Trade and Development of Singapore." Journal of the Malayan Branch of the Royal Asiatic Society 28.1 (1955): 99–143. online
- Bonin, Hubert. History of the Suez Canal Company 1858–2008 (Librairie Droz, 2010).
- Britannica (2007) "Suez Canal", in: The new Encyclopædia Britannica, 15th ed., 28, Chicago: Encyclopædia Britannica, ISBN 1-59339-292-3
- Bulfin, Ailise. "The Fiction of Gothic Egypt and British Imperial Paranoia: The Curse of the Suez Canal." English Literature in Transition, 1880–1920 54.4 (2011): 411–443. online
- Burchell, S.C. Getting to Know The Suez Canal (1971), for middle schools online
- Carminati, Lucia. Seeking Bread and Fortune in Port Said: Labor Migration and the Making of the Suez Canal, 1859–1906 (University of California Press, 2023) see also review of this book
- Farnie, D.A. East and West of Suez: Suez Canal in History, 1854–1956 (1969), a standard scholarly history; 870 pp
- Fletcher, Max E. "The Suez Canal and world shipping, 1869–1914." Journal of Economic History 18.4 (1958): 556–573.
- Galil, B.S. and Zenetos, A. (2002). "A sea change: exotics in the eastern Mediterranean Sea", in: Leppäkoski, E., Gollasch, S. and Olenin, S. (eds), Invasive aquatic species of Europe : distribution, impacts, and management, Dordrecht; Boston : Kluwer Academic, ISBN 1-4020-0837-6, pp. 325–336
- Garrison, Ervan G. (1999) A history of engineering and technology : artful methods, 2nd ed., Boca Raton, Fla.; London : CRC Press, ISBN 0-8493-9810-X
- Hallberg, Charles W. The Suez Canal: Its History and Diplomatic Importance (1931), a standard scholarly history; 440 pp; online
- Huber, Valeska. "Connecting colonial seas: the 'international colonisation' of Port Said and the Suez Canal during and after the First World War." European Review of History: Revue europeenne d'histoire 19.1 (2012): 141–161. online
- Karabell, Zachary (2003) Parting the Desert: The Creation of the Suez Canal, Knopf, ISBN 978-0-375-40883-0 online
- Obieta, Joseph A. The international status of the Suez canal (Springer Science & Business Media, 2012).
- Pudney, John. Suez; De Lesseps' Canal (Praeger, 1969).
- Rathbone, William (1882). Great Britain and the Suez Canal . London: Chapman and Hall, Limited.
- Sanford, Eva Matthews (1938) The Mediterranean world in ancient times, Ronald series in history, New York : The Ronald Press Company, 618 p.
- Wilson, Arnold T. (1939). The Suez Canal. Its Past, Present, and Future (2nd ed.). London, New York, Toronto: Oxford University Press.
- Wilson, Arnold. "The Suez Canal." International Affairs 18#3, (1939), pp. 380–95. online

=== Historiography and memory ===
- Carminati, Lucia. "Suez: A hollow canal in need of peopling. Currents and stoppages in the historiography, 1859–1956." History Compass 19.5 (2021): 1–14. online
- Curli, Barbara. "Italy and the Suez Canal: Historical and Historiographical Passages from a Euro-Mediterranean Perspective." in Italy and the Suez Canal, from the Mid-nineteenth Century to the Cold War: A Mediterranean History (Springer International Publishing, 2022) pp. 1–26.
- Oster, Uwe (2006) Le fabuleux destin des inventions : le canal de Suez, TV documentary produced by ZDF and directed by Axel Engstfeld (Germany)
- Searight, S. "A dismal but Profitable Ditch: The Suez Canal Then and now" Asian Affairs, (2016) 47, 93–100. https://doi.org/10.1080/03068374.2015.1129870 online]
