= Heroopolite Gulf =

In ancient times, the Heroopolite Gulf was the Gulf of Suez in the vicinity of Heroopolis; there is evidence indicating that the Red Sea and its Gulf of Suez extended as far northward as the Bitter Lakes of Egypt.

Ptolemy II Philadelphus opened a west–east "Suez" canal in Heroopolis (c. 270-269 BC) and constructed a navigable lock, with sluices, between the Heroopolite Gulf and the Red Sea so as to allow the passage of vessels but prevent salt water from the Red Sea from mingling with the fresh water in the canal.

Ancient cities which were at one time situated along the coastline of the Heroopolite Gulf include Arsinoe, Heroopolis and Olbia.
