= Xin Hai Tong 23 =

Chinese cargo vessel

History

Hong Kong
- Name: Xin Hai Tong 23
- Owner: Xiang B12 HK International Ship Lease

General characteristics
- Type: Container ship
- Length: 190 metres

Xin Hai Tong 23 is a Hong-Kong registered bulk carrier that briefly blocked the Suez Canal on May 25, 2023.

== Description ==
The Xin Hai Tong 23 is a 190-metre long container ship that is 32 metres wide.

The vessel, which was built in 2010, is owned by Xiang B12 HK International Ship Lease.

== History ==
After losing power, the vessel blocked the Suez Canal for one hour and 16 minutes on May 25, 2023. The vessel was travelling from Dhuba to Rotterdam at the time of the incident. Three Egyptian tugboats towed the vessel off the canal's banks.

== See also ==
- Ever Given
