= Bahgat =

Bahgat may refer to:

== People with the surname ==
- Ahmad Bahgat (1932–2011), Egyptian writer and journalist
- Gawdat Bahgat (born 1960s), Egyptian-born American political scientist
- Helmy Bahgat Badawi (1904–1957), Egyptian politician
- Hossam Bahgat (born 1978), Egyptian human rights activist and investigative journalist
- Kerolos Bahgat (born 1992), Egyptian writer
- Mohamed Medhat Bahgat (1926–?), Egyptian basketball player
- Soraya Bahgat (born 1983), Finnish-Egyptian women's rights advocate

== People with the forename ==
- Bahgat Osman (1931–2001), Egyptian cartoonist
- Bahgat G. Sammakia, Egyptian-born American mechanical engineer

== Other ==
- Bahgat Group, Egyptian company
