= 2021 Suez Canal obstruction =

Maritime incident caused by grounded vessel

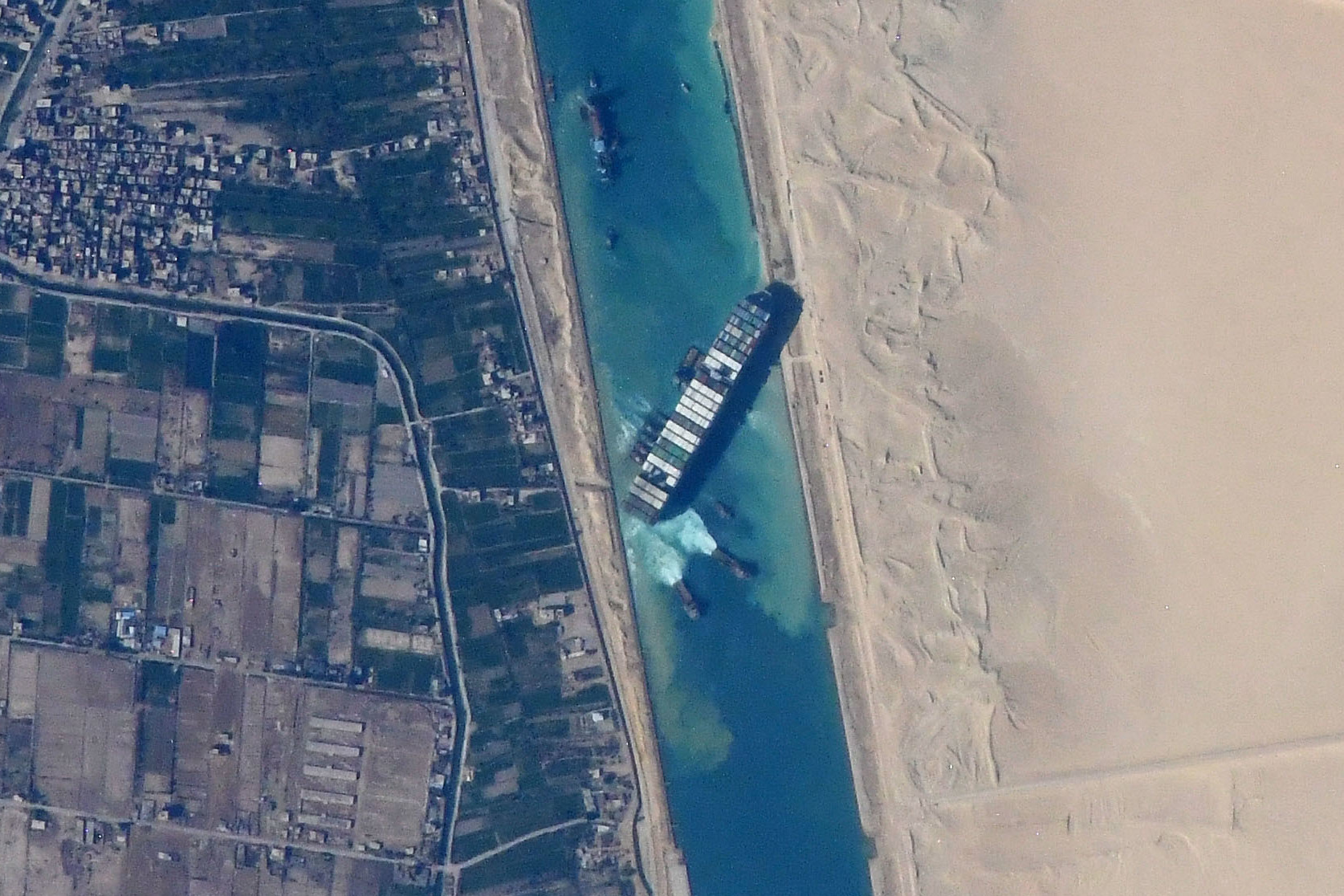
- International Space Station image of Ever Given blocking the canal on 27 March 2021
- Date: 23–29 March 2021
- Time: 07:40 EGY (05:40 UTC)
- Duration: 6 days and 7 hours
- Location: Suez Canal, Suez, Egypt; 30.0175°N 32.5800°E
- Type: Ship grounding
- Cause: Inconclusive
- Deaths: 1 (unidentified)

The Suez Canal was blocked for six days from 23 to 29 March 2021 by the Ever Given, a container ship that had run aground in the canal. The 400-metre-long (1,300 ft), 224,000-ton, 20,000 TEU vessel was buffeted by strong winds on the morning of 23 March, and ended up wedged across the waterway with its bow and stern stuck on opposite canal banks, blocking all traffic until it could be freed. Egyptian authorities said that "technical or human errors" may have also been involved. The obstruction occurred south of the two-channel section of the canal, so other ships could not pass. The Suez Canal Authority (SCA) hired Royal Boskalis through its subsidiary Smit International to manage marine salvage operations. The blockage of one of the world's busiest trade routes slowed trade between Europe, Asia, and the Middle East, tying up goods worth an estimated US$9.6 billion per day. By 28 March, at least 369 ships were queuing to pass through the canal.

On 29 March, Ever Given was partially re-floated and moved by about 80 percent in the correct direction, although the bow remained stuck until the ship was finally freed by fourteen Egyptian, Dutch, and Italian tugs at 15:05 EGY (13:05 UTC). As the ship was towed towards the Great Bitter Lake for technical inspection, the canal was checked for damage and found to be sound. The SCA allowed shipping to resume at 19:00 EGY (17:00 UTC). No injuries were reported during the incident.

The vessel was impounded by the Egyptian government on 13 April when its owner and insurers refused to pay the demanded billion-dollar compensation. In July, a formal settlement of $540 million was reached between the ship owner, the insurers, and the Canal Authority. The ship set sail again on 7 July 2021, stopping for inspections at Port Said before continuing to its original destination, port of Rotterdam. After the incident, the Egyptian government announced that they will widen the narrower parts of the canal.

== Background ==
The Suez Canal, one of the world's most important trading routes, was opened in 1869. By 2021, about fifty ships per day travelled through the canal, representing about 12 percent of total global trade. For much of its length, the canal is not wide enough to allow two ships to pass each other; convoys must take turns transiting these segments of the waterway. An expansion project is underway.

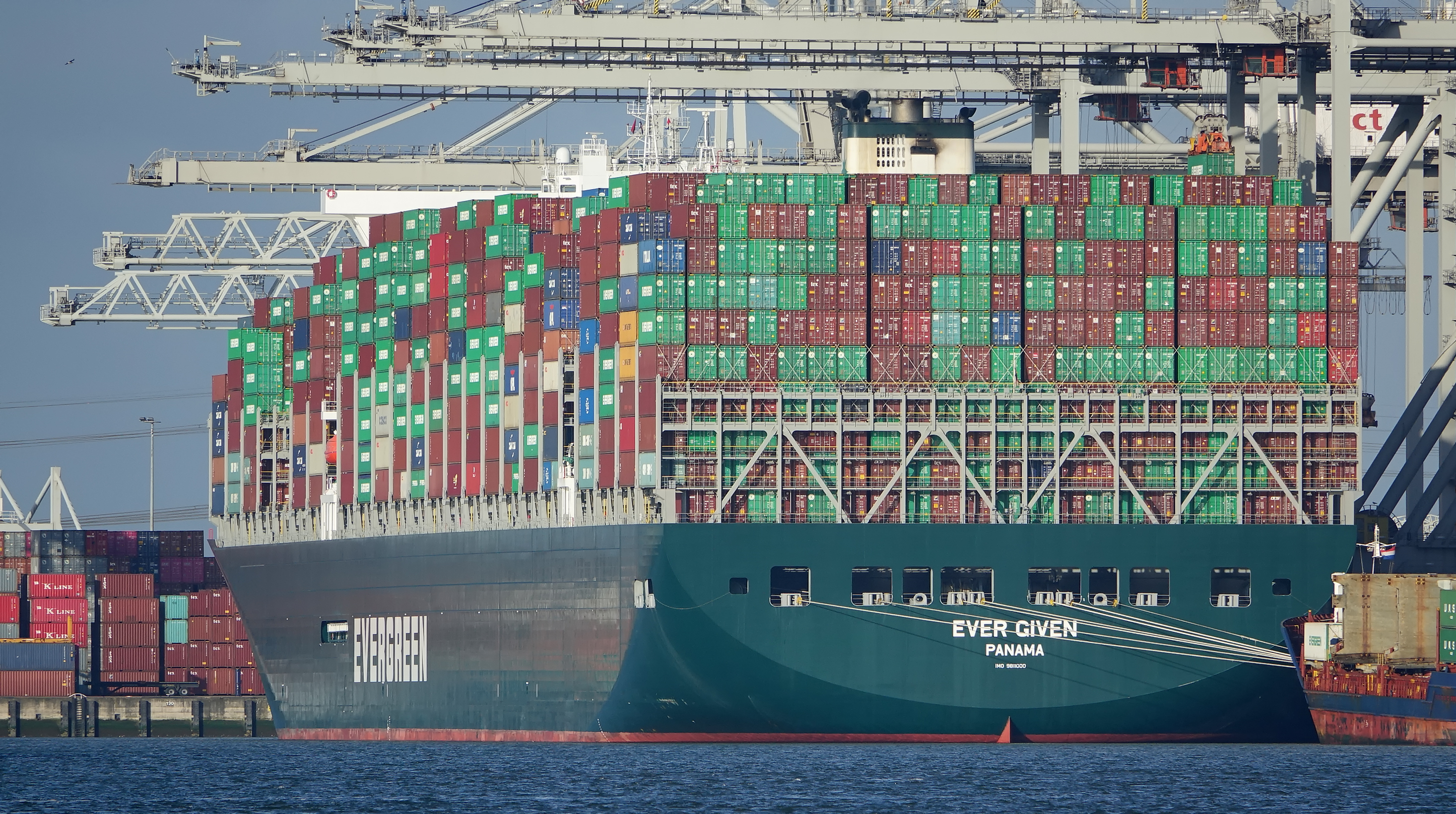
Ever Given in March 2020

Ever Given (IMO 9811000) was laid down on 25 December 2015, launched 9 May 2018, and completed 25 September 2018, replacing an earlier ship of the same name (IMO 8320901). At the time of the incident, she was registered in Panama, owned by the Japanese firm Shoei Kisen Kaisha, leased to the Taiwan-based container shipping company Evergreen Marine for operation, managed by Bernhard Schulte Shipmanagement, and crewed by Indian nationals. The owner Shoei Kisen Kaisha had protection and indemnity (third party) liability coverage for $3.1 billion with mutual UK P&I Club in the Japanese market. In addition, container ships of this size are typically insured for hull and machinery damage of $100 and $140 million.

Prior to the incident, Ever Given had sailed through the canal 22 times. Bill Kavanagh has described sailing through the Suez Canal as "a very complex and high risk operation". Wind gusts will cause the stacked containers to "act like a sail" to blow the heavy ship off course, and its enormous momentum makes it difficult to recover.

The government of Egypt requires ships traversing the canal to be boarded by an Egyptian "Suez crew", including one or more official maritime pilots from Egypt's SCA who command the ship, taking over from the regular crew and the captain. There were two Egyptian SCA pilots on board at the time of the accident.

== Incident ==
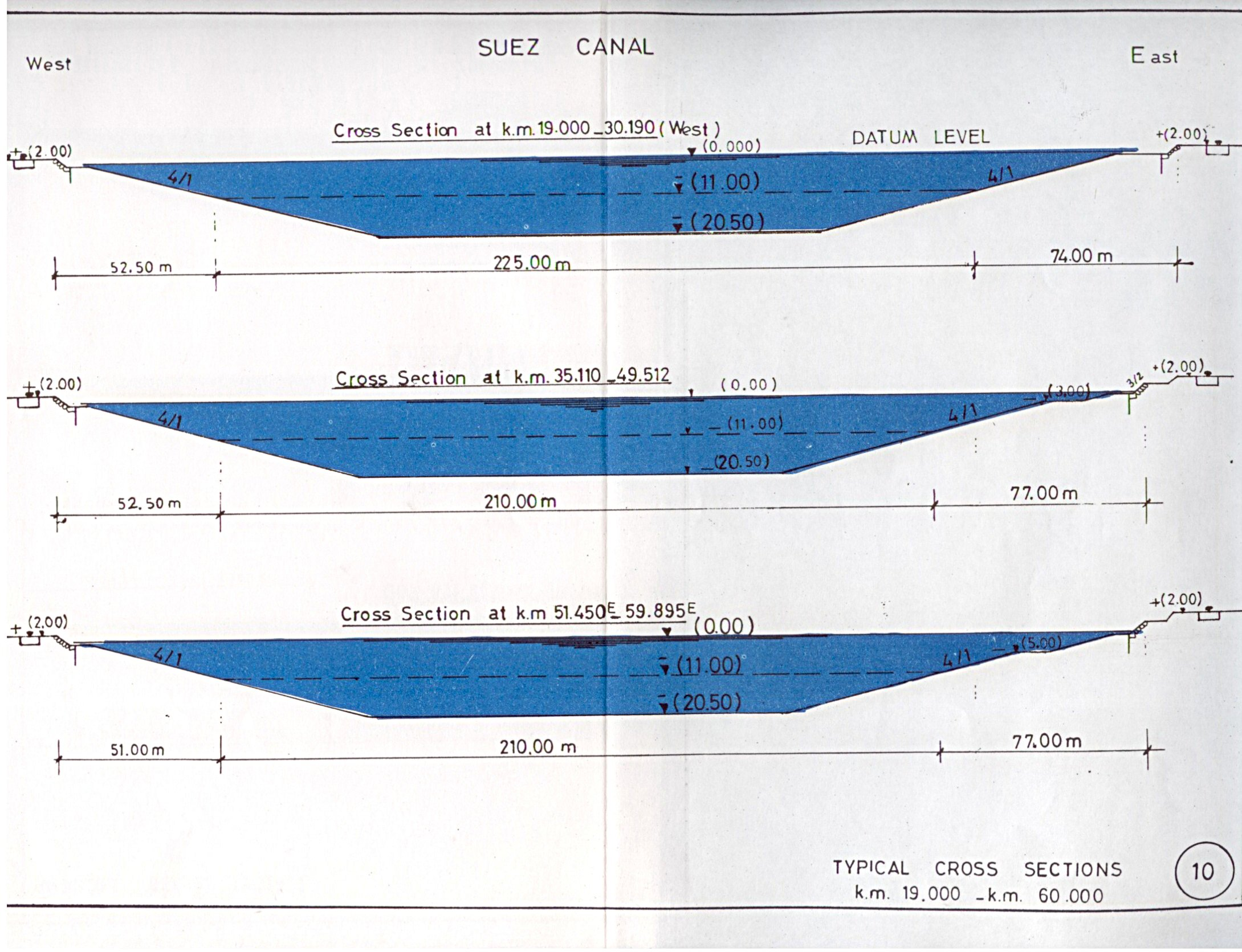
Typical cross-sections of the Suez Canal used for waterway navigation

On 23 March 2021, Ever Given was travelling from Tanjung Pelepas, Malaysia, to the Port of Rotterdam, Netherlands. As it traversed the Suez Canal, it was fifth in a northbound convoy through the single-lane stretch, with fifteen vessels behind it. At 07:40 EGY (05:40 UTC), the ship was caught in a sandstorm. Strong winds exceeding 40 kn (74 km/h; 46 mph) resulted in the "loss of the ability to steer the ship", causing the hull to deviate. The ship ran aground at the 151-kilometre (82 nmi) mark measured from Port Said on the Mediterranean Sea, 10 km (5.4 nmi) from Suez Port on the Gulf of Suez, near the village of Manshiyet Rugola. The ship turned sideways, unable to free itself, blocking the canal on both sides. The crew, consisting entirely of Indian nationals, was accounted for and no injuries were reported.

According to an analysis of data from ship-tracking websites by Evert Lataire, head of Maritime Technology division at the University of Ghent, the bank effect – which may cause the stern of a ship to swing toward the near bank when operating in constricted waterway – may have contributed to the grounding, along with the lateral forces of west-to-east winds pushing sideways against the northbound ship. Since most of the focus of modern ship design is directed towards efficiency and stability at sea, the effects of hydrodynamics in shallow waters, especially in light of the rapidly growing size of ships in the past decade, remain somewhat obscure and in need of further study.

Over 300 vessels at both ends of the canal were obstructed by Ever Given, including five other container ships of similar size. These included 41 bulk carriers and 24 crude oil tankers. The affected vessels represented roughly 16.9 million tonnes (37 billion pounds) of deadweight. Some docked at ports and anchorages in the area, while many remained in place. The Ever Given's sister ship, Ever Greet, was affected by the disruption, as were two Russian Navy vessels: Steregushchiy-class corvette Stoikiy and Altay-class oiler Kola. These two vessels, believed to have been the only military vessels affected by the blockage, were conducting naval exercises in the area at the time. Kola had been involved in a minor collision with bulk carrier Ark Royal earlier that day; the two were anchored roughly 11 km (5.9 nmi) away from each other for the duration of the incident.

== Salvage and refloating ==
On 25 March, the Suez Canal Authority (SCA) suspended navigation through the canal until Ever Given could be refloated. On the same day, Egyptian President Abdel Fattah el-Sisi's advisor on seaports stated that he expected the canal to be cleared in "48–72 hours, maximum". The Suez Canal Authority engaged the Dutch company Royal Boskalis through its subsidiary Smit Salvage to manage marine salvage operations. Peter Berdowski, Chief Executive of Boskalis, stated that such an operation "can take days to weeks". On 26 March, the SCA accepted an offer made by a United States Navy assessment team of dredging experts to assist in efforts to remove the ship.

Boskalis' team of experts collaborated with the Canal Authority, directing a team of Egyptian, Dutch, and Japanese workers. Over a dozen tugboats were brought to tow and push the ship, and suction dredgers to remove sand and silt from under her bow and stern. High-capacity pumps were brought to remove or redistribute the weight of fuel oil and water ballast on the ship. Backup plans contemplated unloading the 18,300 TEU of 15-tonne containers (Note: While the capacity of container ships is usually measured in twenty-foot equivalent units (TEUs), most of the containers on board Ever Given were in fact of the forty-foot variety.) using large floating cranes or even heavy lift helicopters, but this was deemed impractical and hazardous.

As a first step, vessels were moved from behind Ever Given to make room for the refloating operation. Fuel and nine thousand tonnes of ballast water were removed to lighten the ship as an excavator began to dig out the bow. By the following day, the Canal Authority said its dredging operations were about 87 percent complete.

On 27 March, a high tide enabled a small flotilla of tugboats to join the efforts to re-float the ship. Yukito Higaki, president of Shoei Kisen Kaisha, reported: "The ship is not taking water. Once it refloats, it should be able to operate." By 18:00 UTC, the ship had moved north by 17 metres (56 ft). More than 300 ships were delayed near the canal, with others still approaching and some diverted to alternative routes. Delays were expected to persist even after Ever Given was freed, as vessels might face busy ports.

Admiral Osama Rabie, SCA chairman, told a press conference that weather conditions were "not the main reasons" for the ship's grounding, adding that "there may have been technical or human errors", and that all factors would be investigated.

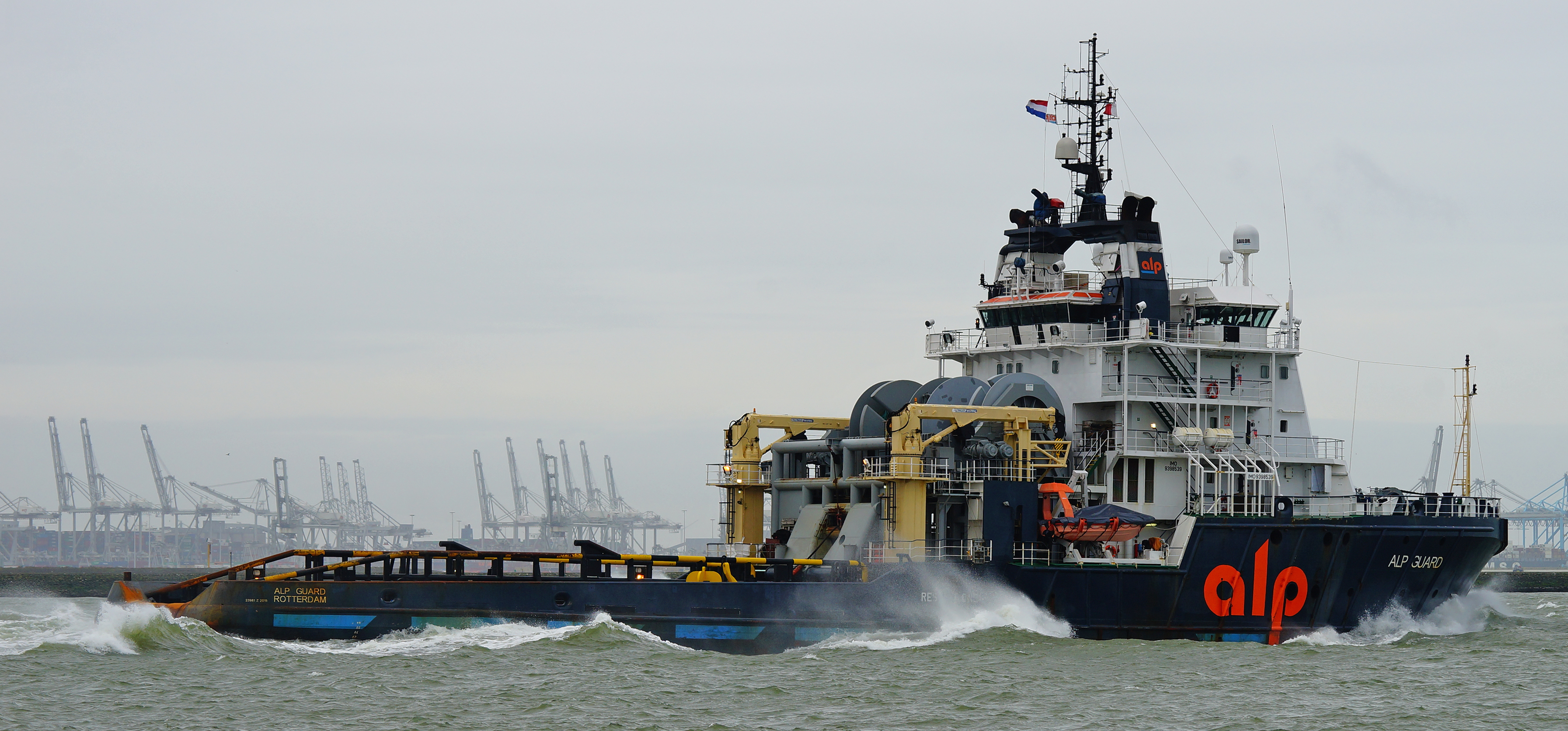
ALP Guard seagoing tug 285 mt cont. bollard pull

On 28 March, efforts to dislodge the ship progressed to allow some movement of the stern and its rudder at high tide. Rabie said that "at any time the ship could slide and move from the spot it is in", and he hoped it would not be necessary to unload containers from the ship, despite strong tides and winds complicating recovery efforts. This came as the Egyptian President, Abdel Fattah el-Sisi, ordered preliminary preparations be made for lightening the ship's cargo. The seagoing tug Alp Guard, with a bollard pull of 285 tonnes, arrived that morning, almost doubling the available towing capacity.

On 29 March, the stern of Ever Given was refloated at 04:30 local time (02:30 UTC), and a second seagoing tug, the Italian Carlo Magno, with a bollard pull of 153 tonnes arrived, giving a further large increase in towing capacity. Ballast was adjusted, and towing timed to make maximum use of the ebbing king tide of a supermoon tidal flow. At 15:05 local time (13:05 UTC), the ship was pulled free.

The vessel was towed to the Great Bitter Lake for inspection. After a search of the bottom and soil of the canal, it was reopened to shipping from 19:00 local time (17:00 UTC). By then more than 400 ships were waiting: approximately 200 in the Red Sea, under 200 in the Mediterranean Sea; and around 50 in the Bitter Lakes.

On 31 March, with the Ever Given at anchor in the Great Bitter Lake along the canal, divers and SCA investigators started inspecting the ship for damage, as well as interrogating the crew to determine the causes of the grounding. The backlog of ships delayed by the blockage was finally cleared by 3 April.

In June 2021, the SCA stated that one person died during the six-day salvage operation.

Events during the several days the canal was blocked highlighted the difficulties of saving larger ships, which requires more time and more equipment. If Ever Given had required intervention of floating cranes to remove some containers (assuming crane ships of sufficient capacity would have been available within any realistic time-frame), the process would have required larger equipment working for longer, and would have been likely to prolong the blockage by "days, even weeks".

== Legal issues and seizure ==
=== Legal compensation claims ===
Through April and May, the ship remained under seizure, pending a settlement for damages between the ship's owners and the Suez Canal Authority. SCA head Osama Rabie demanded a billion-dollar compensation for lost revenue and the cost of the salvage operation, and warned that legal battles could prevent the departure of the ship. Concerns were raised for the crew, who would be effectively detained until the incident was resolved.

Merchant marine operations, always complex, expensive, and risky, are regulated under the centuries-old international Admiralty law. The issue was complicated by the "labyrinthine ownership structure of container ships", issues of jurisdiction, and competing investigation results. While the ship's Japanese owner, Shoei Kisen, indicated a willingness to pay compensation, it might not shoulder the burden alone, and filed a lawsuit against the ship's operator. On 4 April, the owner declared "general average", a principle of maritime law that "the owner of cargo on board a ship should contribute to the cost of rescuing the vessel during a major casualty event". The previous time this was invoked, following the 2018 fire on the Maersk Honam, the adjustor fixed a salvage payment of 54% of the value for cargo owners to recover their property. This could be particularly damaging to owners of uninsured shipments, such as small businesses. The general average process was stalled by the seizure of the ship, as the process requires that "the goods and the ship must successfully reach the destination, otherwise, there is no general average". Further complications were caused by the huge number of cargo interests involved.

=== Seizure ===
On 13 April, the ship was seized by a court in Ismailia after a request by the SCA pending payment of compensations exceeding US$916 million, including $300 million for the salvage and $300 million for "loss of reputation". Marine industry specialists considered this an "outrageous" measure causing unnecessary duress to both the crew and cargo owners. The Indian crew members remained effectively detained on board, although 2 of the 25 were allowed to depart on 15 April due to "urgent personal circumstances". The ship's operator Evergreen was reportedly exploring options to transfer cargo to another ship to fulfill its delivery commitments, but an Egyptian court confirmed that the arrest affected both the ship and its cargo.

A major concern remained for the crew, as it has not been unprecedented for a crew to be stuck for years while claims are resolved. Local seafarer union representatives visited the crew and captain on 18 April, who were eager to resume sailing. Parallels were made with the MV Aman (IMO 9215517), detained in the canal since July 2017 due to safety and regulatory issues and with one crew member obliged to remain on board as legal guardian. (Note: The crew member, the ship's first mate, was finally allowed to leave in late April 2021.) The International Labour Organization noted that this trend of "seafarer abandonment" was on the rise, and there were more than 250 known cases as of April 2021. Three further crew members whose contracts were expiring were allowed to leave on 29 April. Day-to-day operations on board the ship, including routine safety drills and maintenance, were continuing as usual, with the ship's manager saying that "minimum safe manning standards for the vessel will be maintained at all times". According to the International Transport Workers' Federation (ITF), the crew was well cared for, although it stated that such situations highlight the necessity to further protect seafarers' rights, calling the crew "human pawns in a wider game being played over compensation".

The ship's insurer British P&I Club rejected the SCA compensation claim as unjustified and excessive, while the SCA blamed the ship's owner for being unwilling "to pay anything". On 16 April, it was also reported that the ship could be moved from its location on the Great Bitter Lake to Port Said for further inspection: the ship's classification society had already issued a fitness certificate for the move. On 23 April, the insurer lodged an appeal against the detention of the ship, which was denied by an Egyptian judge on 4 May. The ship owner Shoei Kisen Kaisha notified container owners of their liability in any compensation payment under general average. The ship remained in a legal grey area.

On 10 May, the SCA cut its compensation claims down to $600 million. A final settlement of $540 million was subsequently accepted by the SCA. In addition to the money, the SCA would be given a 75-ton tugboat from the ship owner Shoei Kisen Kaisha to replace one that was destroyed during the recovery effort. On 7 July 2021, Egyptian authorities released Ever Given and the ship sailed to Port Said. Inspections were carried out, with the cargo vessel finally departing on 12 July, after a delay of more than 100 days. Ever Given finally reached Rotterdam and Felixstowe with its cargo, after which it was taken out of service for inspection and maintenance, sailing through the canal again on 20 August en route to Qingdao for repairs, and returning to regular service in mid-November 2021.

== Economic impact ==
The incident exposed a need to investigate issues of supply chain resilience and disruption to just-in-time manufacturing already facing shortages from COVID-19 pandemic impacts. The "complete disconnect of ship size development from developments in the actual economy" (OECD report, 2015), and the corresponding limitations of existing infrastructure to handle them – a process evident in the Suez, where expansion work on the northern end of the canal has been ongoing – led to the incident being described by Michael Safi in The Guardian as a "worst-case scenario that many saw coming".

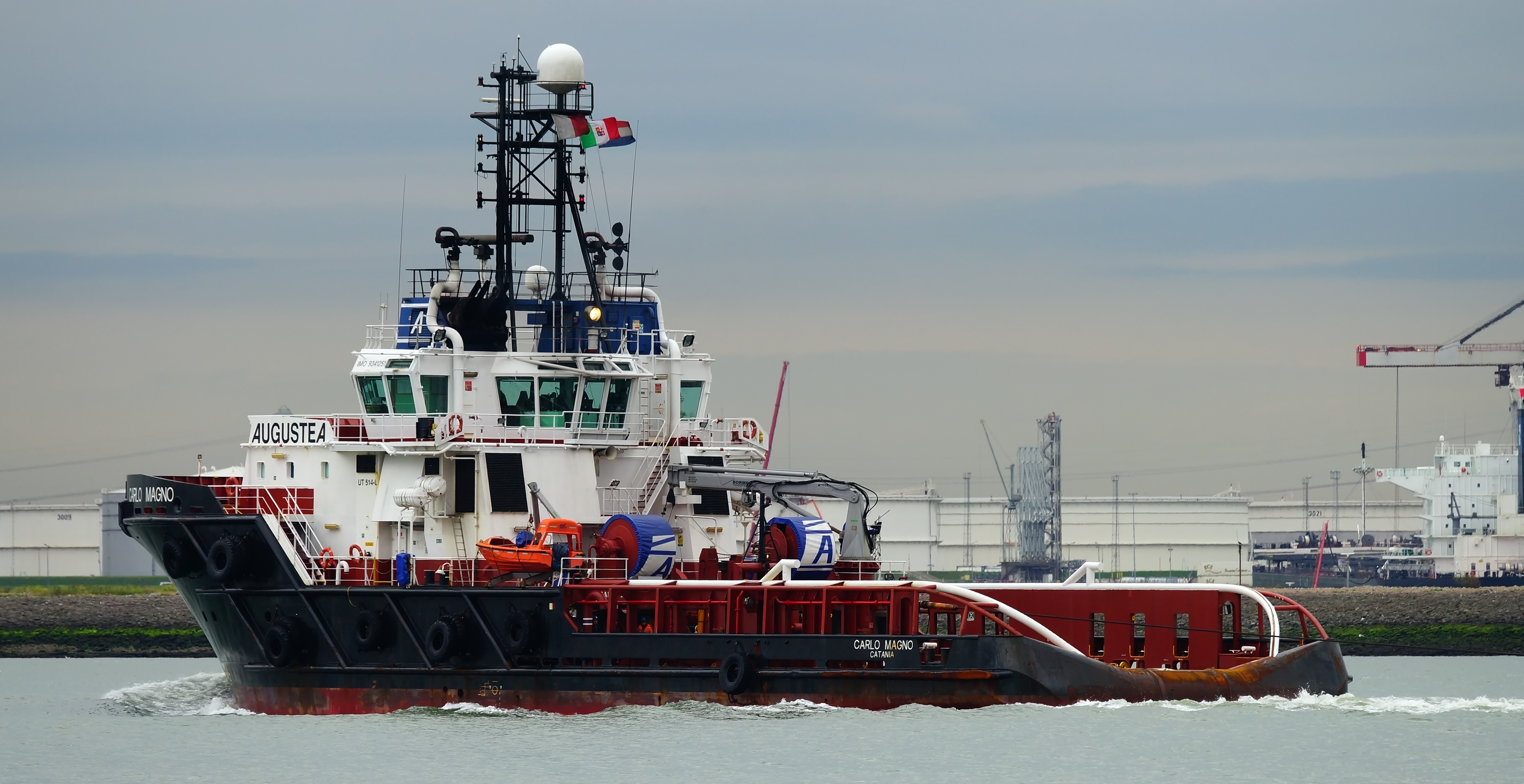
Carlo Magno seagoing tug 153 mt cont. bollard pull

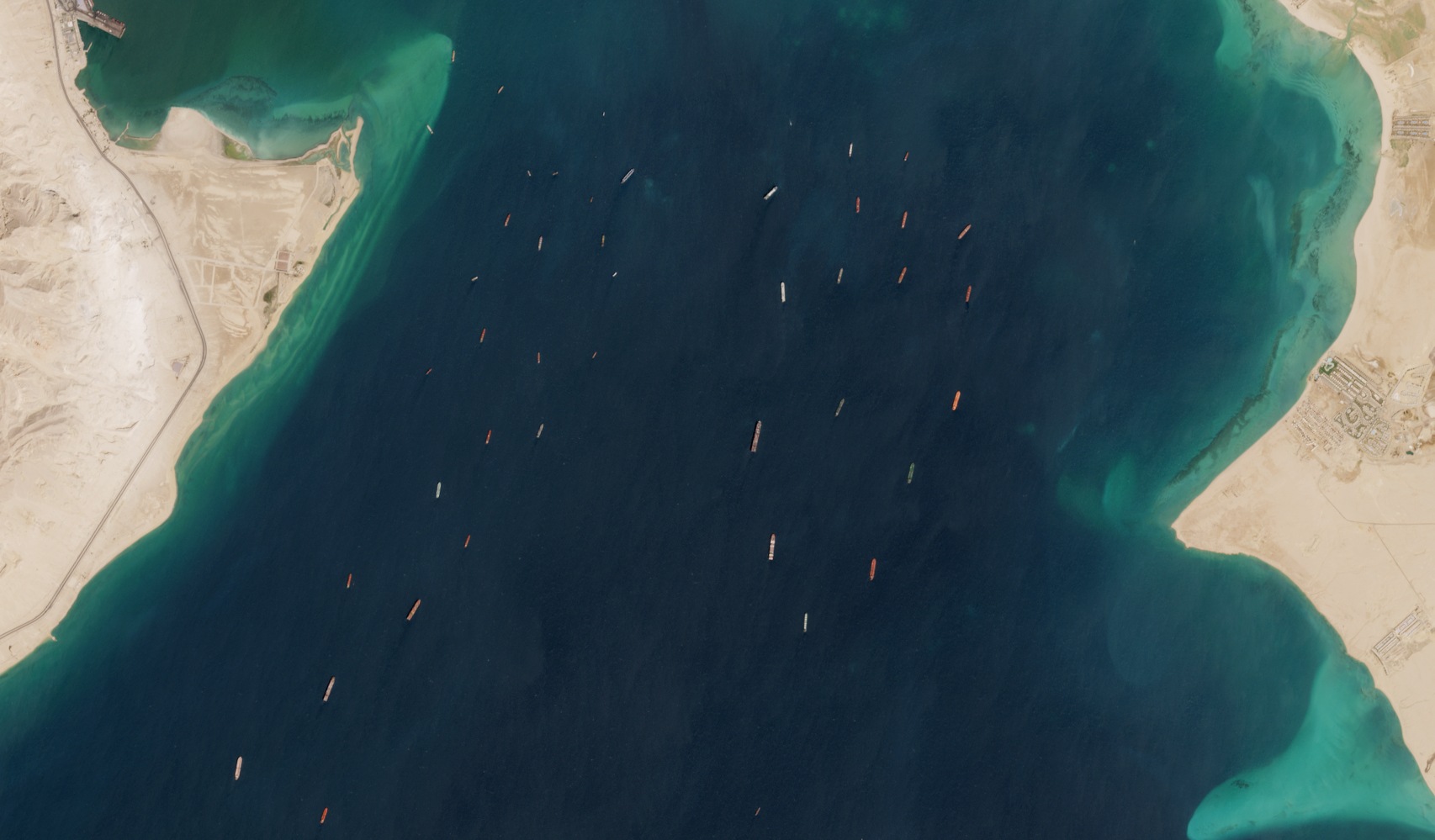

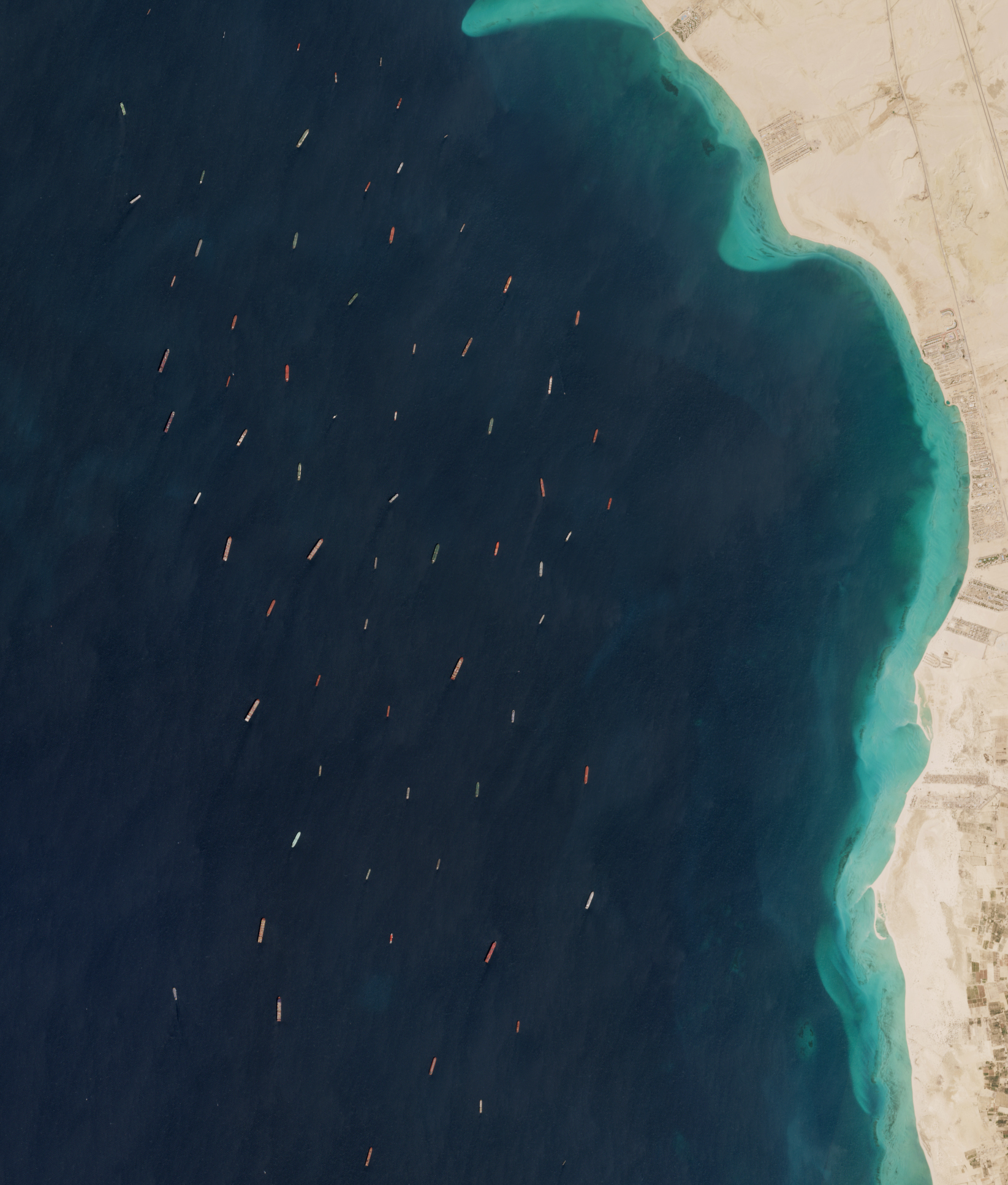
These two satellite images show parts of the ship traffic jam in the canal caused by the Ever Given's obstruction, 29 March 2021

=== Rise in prices ===
Maritime and logistics experts warned that the incident would likely result in shipping delays of everyday items for customers around the world. Maritime historian Sal Mercogliano told the Associated Press: "Every day the canal is closed... container ships and tankers are not delivering food, fuel and manufactured goods to Europe and goods are not being exported from Europe to the Far East." Lloyd's List estimated during the blockage the value of the goods delayed each hour at US$400 million, and that every day it takes to clear the obstruction would disrupt an additional US$9 billion worth of goods. Rabie estimated that Egypt lost $12–14 million per day due to the closure. The SCA calculated it lost approximately US$15 million per day in transit fees. Despite the blockage, overall revenue for the first six months of 2021 was up by 8.8% to US$3 billion when compared with the same period the previous year.

Michael Lynch, president of Strategic Energy and Economic Research, attributed a rise in oil prices to "people buying in after recent declines in oil prices, with the Suez closing the trigger factor". James Williams, energy economist at WTRG Economics, said that in light of existing stocks "a few days of slowdown in [oil] delivery is not critical to the market". On the contrary, oil prices had plummeted after the Suez Canal became unblocked on 29 March 2021, as a result of delayed supply of oil from other cargo ships.

=== Knock-on delays ===
The event delayed goods, which impacted industries with existing shortages, such as with semiconductors, thereby influencing markets already at risk of collapsing. To mitigate shortages of goods in the long term, future shipments could be ordered earlier than normal until the difference has been made up. However, a consultant at another firm noted that even a short-term disruption at the Suez Canal would have a domino effect for several months along the supply chain, an effect already apparent in the weeks following the incident. This kind of disruption is not unique to the incident: the historical trend for shipping rates to rise after interruptions in the supply chain is well documented, and analysts such as Ioannis Theotokas of the University of Piraeus noted that the crisis "led to a lot of losses for freight owners and charterers", and that a prolonged closure could have had impacts similar to the 1967 Arab-Israeli War. Some freight forwarders noted that demand for alternative means of transportation was expected to rise within the next few weeks on Europe to Asia routes, as a consequence of shippers seeking to avoid the disruption and uncertainty caused by the blockage of the canal. Following the resolution of the incident, forwarders in India noted difficulties with securing shipments to Europe or Africa, with many prior bookings cancelled and increased freight rates hitting small and medium-sized exporters particularly harshly. In England and across Europe, supply chain disruption from the canal incident, coupled with an already increased interest in gardening due to COVID-19 lockdowns, led to a shortage of garden gnomes.

Knock-on effects were equally noticeable in several European ports: despite ports anticipating delays and using the week-long lull of the Ever Given blockage to prepare, many had difficulties handling the sudden spike in traffic. Shipping lines often discharged containers wherever possible, to be able to return to ports in Asia where several weeks of cargo were available at inflated rates, often prioritising the back-loading of empty containers and leaving urgent deliveries on the quay. Importers were advised of many cases where cargo was discharged, but at a port other than the expected destination, and that there were no schedules for further transport of said cargo, creating a "perfect storm" with no time nor capacity to spare for the delayed shipments. Congestion at Antwerp and Rotterdam was also delaying hinterland barge operations. The quick turn-around of ships in Europe was expected to have an overall positive impact on carriers' abilities to recover their schedules, with disruption expected to be cleared up by early June, more than two months after Ever Given had been freed.

=== Alternative routes ===
The default alternative route for maritime traffic between Asia and Europe is to go around Africa via the Cape of Good Hope, a trip which can add up to two weeks to journey time, with this alternative having been taken by some ships. Russia used the incident to promote its Arctic shipping routes as a shorter alternative to carrying goods around Africa.

Concerns about piracy, due to the unprecedented concentration of valuable shipping in such a small area, prompted shipping companies to make inquiries, at the time of the incident, to the Bahrain–based United States Fifth Fleet about security.

The incident highlighted the fragility of the global supply chain by causing tangible damage to businesses across the globe. Rising political tensions raise fears that ill-intentioned actors could similarly disrupt a tightly interconnected global economy by weaponising its chokepoints in the future, despite the prohibition of waterway blockades under the 1888 Constantinople Convention, with devastating effects for world trade.

=== Livestock ===
Concern was raised about livestock transported through the route, with 130,000 sheep being transported to Romania alone; Gabi Paun of Animals International stated "Every hour counts for the sheep and the fatality rate will only grow ... even if the law was respected and the ships were carrying 25% more food ... it would nonetheless have been finished by now". A previous 2020 report by the European Commission discovered many ships used for transporting animals were not fit for that purpose, and that oversight was lacking aboard ships of several member states, including Romania, France and Spain. Loading of livestock ships for export was temporarily suspended by the Romanian and Spanish authorities until the canal cleared.

== In popular culture ==
In 2022 BBC Two showed a 59-minute documentary episode on the incident Disaster Investigation: Why Ships Crash by Windfall Films Ltd for the BBC.

Various internet memes about the incident have been published, alongside numerous jokes. "Ever Given Everywhere", a web app that allows users to place Ever Given anywhere in the world also went viral. Jokes and memes have been posted by users on mobile-platform TikTok depicting their personal interpretations of the incident. Individual suggestions for fixing the incident in a joking manner were also spread on Twitter, alongside comments over the relevance of some users' feeling that their personal issues corresponded to the ship being stuck. Mods were created for Microsoft Flight Simulator showing the ship grounded in the canal. On the day that the Ever Given was unblocked, Google celebrated the event by adding in an Easter egg where searching "Suez Canal" or "Ever Given" would display an animation of boats moving along the sidebar. Some commentators made humorous references to the 1982 book How to Avoid Huge Ships.

An April Fools' story published by The Guardian, claiming plans to build a second canal in Egypt, also gained traction in Turkish media, before it was marked as a fool at noon by The Guardian (as is common for such humorous fabrications).

False rumours were also spread blaming the grounding on Marwa Elselehdar, the first Egyptian female ship captain, apparently based on a doctored Arab News publication. The female officer in question was actually first mate on board the Aida IV, which was hundreds of miles away in Alexandria at the time of the incident.

The Suez Canal Authority museum dedicated one of its galleries to the obstruction.

In Fall Out Boy's 2023 cover of "We Didn't Start the Fire", the incident is referenced at the end of the second verse, as "Ever Given, Suez!"

In 2022, the American television show What We Do in the Shadows referenced the obstruction in its season four episode "Reunited". In the episode, vampire Nandor is stuck in a shipping container on the Ever Given.

== See also ==
- 1974 Suez Canal Clearance Operation, a US-led operation to clear the canal of naval mines and wrecked ships after its closure in the Six-Day War
- Closure of the Suez Canal (1956–1957)
- Closure of the Suez Canal (1967–1975)
- High-speed railway to Eilat, a proposed railway in Israel that might act as a backup in case of another obstruction
- Yellow Fleet, a group of fifteen ships trapped in the canal from 1967 to 1975 as a result of the Six-Day War
- Francis Scott Key Bridge collapse
