= First Naguib Cabinet =

Egyptian cabinet (1952–1953)

The cabinet of Mohamed Naguib was the last cabinet of the Kingdom of Egypt and the first cabinet of the Republic of Egypt. It governed the country under the nominal rule of King Fuad II from 7 September 1952, when the Aly Maher government was dismissed by the Revolutionary Command Council, to 18 June 1953, when a republic was declared. Subsequently, it governed until 25 February 1954, with Naguib also serving as president. It was succeeded by the first Nasser Cabinet.

== List of ministers ==
First Cabinet of Mohamed Naguib (7 September 1952 - 25 February 1954)
Office	Minister	Start of term	End of term
Prime Minister	Mohamed Naguib	7 September 1952	25 February 1954
Deputy Prime Minister	Sulayman Hafez	7 September 1952	18 June 1953
	Gamal Abdel Nasser	18 June 1953	25 February 1954
Minister of War	Mohamed Naguib	7 September 1952	18 June 1953
	Abdel Latif Boghdadi	8 June 1953	25 February 1954
Minister of the Interior	Sulayman Hafez	7 September 1952	18 June 1953
	Gamal Abdel Nasser	18 June 1953	25 February 1954
Minister of Foreign Affairs	Ahmed Mohammed Farrag Tayeh	7 September 1952	8 December 1952
	Mahmoud Fawzi	8 December 1952	25 February 1954
Minister of Justice	Ahmed Housni	7 September 1952	25 February 1954
Minister of Finance	Abdel Galil el-Emary	7 September 1952	25 February 1954
Minister of National Guidance	Fathi Radwan	17 November 1952	8 December 1953
	Mohammed Fuad Galal	8 December 1953	18 June 1953
	Salah Salem	18 June 1953	25 February 1954
Minister of Sudanese Affairs	Salah Salem	18 June 1953	25 February 1954
Minister of Education	Ismail al-Qabbani	7 September 1952	
Minister of Commerce and Industry	Mohammed Sabry	7 September 1952	8 December 1952
	Helmy Bahgat Badawi	8 December 1952	25 February 1954
Minister of Agriculture	Abdelaziz Abdullah Salem	7 September 1952	8 December 1952
	Abdul Razak Sidki	8 December 1952	25 February 1954
Minister of Public Health	Nureddin Tarraf	7 September 1952	25 February 1954
Minister of Communications	Hussein Abou Zeid	7 September 1952	18 June 1953
Minister of Municipal and Rural Affairs	Abdelaziz Aly	7 September 1952	
Minister of Public Works	Mourad Fahmy	7 September 1952	18 June 1953
Minister of Social Affairs	Mohammed Fuad Galal	7 September 1952	8 December 1952
	Abbaz Ammar	8 December 1952	
Minister of Supplies	Farid Antoun	7 September 1952	8 December 1952
	Mohammed Sabri Mansour	8 December 1952	16 June 1953
	Helmy Bahgat Badawi	16 June 1953	
Minister of Waqfs	Ahmed Hassan Bakoury	7 September 1952	
Minister of State without Portfolio	Fathi Radwan	7 September 1952	17 November 1952
		8 December 1952	
