= Suez Canal Area Development Project =

Egyptian megaproject

- Location: Suez Canal region

Specifications
- Status: Completed
- Navigation authority: Suez Canal Corridor Development Project Authority

History
- Original owner: Egyptian Government
- Principal engineer: Dar Al-Handasah
- Construction began: 5 August 2014

The Suez Canal Corridor Area Project (Arabic: مشروع تطوير محور قناة السويس) was a megaproject in Egypt that was launched on 5 August 2014 by President Abdel Fattah el-Sisi and was completed in 2015. The project aimed to increase the role of the Suez Canal region in international trade and to develop the canal cities of Suez, Ismailia, and Port Said.

The project involved the construction of a new city, Ismailia, along with an industrial zone and fish farms, aimed at promoting the development of the tech industry. Additionally, seven new tunnels were built between Sinai, Ismailia, and Port Said, and improvements were made to five existing ports. The project also included the creation of new centers for logistics and ship services, and the digging of a new canal parallel to the Suez Canal. The purpose of the new canal was to increase capacity by allowing ships to sail in both directions simultaneously.

Egyptian President Abdel Fattah el-Sisi announced that the New Suez Canal project would operate within a year (instead of the original plan of three years). The project's authority projected revenues of the canal to increase from 5 billion dollars to 12.5 billion dollars annually. The new canal channel and the seven (7) tunnels were under construction simultaneously. Construction of the rest of the projects (which included building the city, industrial zone, "technology valley", and fish farms) began in February 2015.

== History ==
The Suez Canal Corridor Developing Project dates back to the 1970s when former Egyptian Minister of Housing, Hassaballah El Kafrawy proposed the project to President Anwar al Sadat. Due to various problems, the project failed to start. He proposed the project again to President Hosni Mubarak in the 1990s, but to no avail. Hassaballah El Kafrawy sought to turn the canal corridor into an international logistics region rather than just a passageway for ships.

In 2008, the former Minister of Transportation, Mohamed Mansour again proposed the project. However, the Egyptian government again did not initiate the project.

In 2012, the Muslim Brotherhood introduced a development project for the Suez Canal region during the presidential elections. In 2013, Prime Minister Hesham Qandil announced that the government would begin planning for the project.

== Projects ==
=== New Suez Canal ===
New Suez Canal
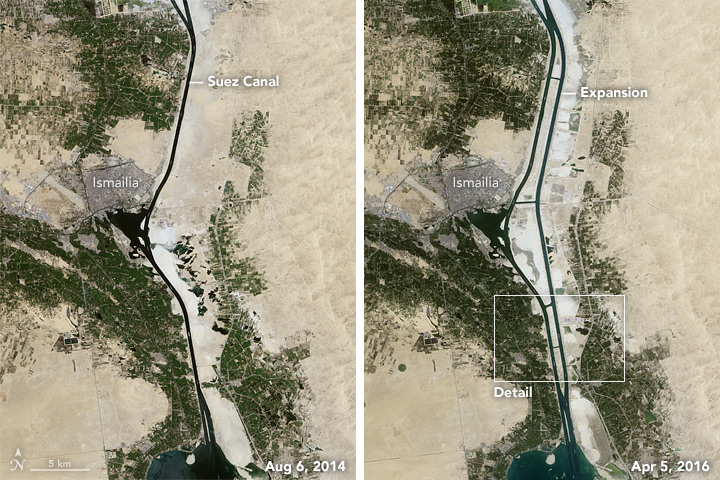
- Old and New Suez Canal

Specifications
- Length: 35 km (22 miles)
- Locks: None
- Status: Open
- Navigation authority: Suez Canal Authority

History
- Original owner: Suez Canal Authority
- Principal engineer: Egyptian Armed Forces (EAAF)
- Other engineers: The Arab Contractors Orascom Construction Industries 84 other companies
- Construction began: 5 August 2014
- Date of first use: 6 August 2015
- Date completed: 9 December 2016

Geography
- Branch of: Suez Canal (Length 193.30 km)

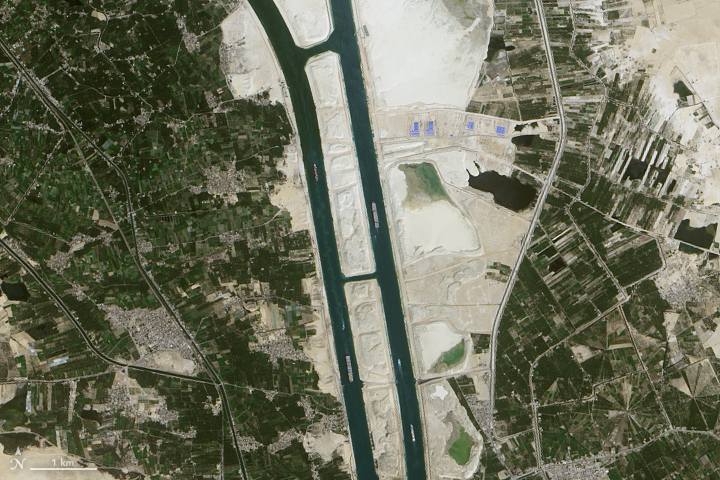
New Suez Canal close up

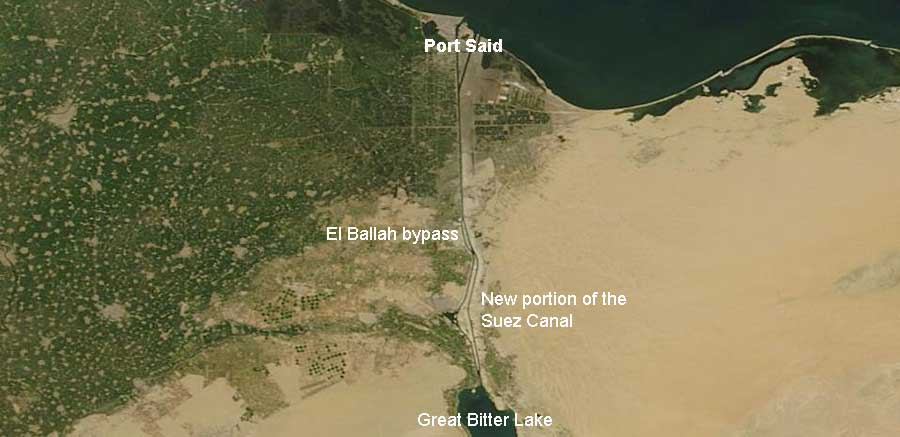
New Suez Canal aerial view

The New Suez Canal (Egyptian Arabic: قناة السويس الجديدة Kanāt El Sewēs El Gedīda) is an artificial waterway project in Egypt which created a second shipping lane along part of the Suez Canal, and deepened and widened other stretches. The project was inaugurated by the Chairman of the Suez Canal Authority Mohab Mamish in the presence of Egyptian President Abdel Fattah el-Sisi on 5 August 2014. The new canal opened one year later in a ceremony attended by several international dignitaries including the then French President François Hollande.

The New Suez Canal is expected to expand trade along the fastest shipping route between Europe and Asia. The new canal allows ships to sail in both directions at the same time. This decreases transit time from 18 to 11 hours for most ships. The expansion is expected to double the capacity of the Suez Canal from 49 to 97 ships a day.

The New Suez Canal is 72 km (45 mi) long, including 35 km (22 mi) of dry digging, and 37 km (23 mi) of "expansion and deep digging" to provide a second shipping lane in the existing 164-kilometre-long (102 mi) canal, allowing for separated passing of ships in opposite directions. It also includes the deepening and expansion of a 37-kilometre-long (23 mi) section of the existing canal. The construction, which was scheduled to take three years, was instead ordered by the President to be completed in a year. The chairman of the Suez Canal Authority announced that the revenues from the Suez Canal (after the completion of the New Suez Canal) will jump from 5 billion dollars to 12.5 billion dollars annually. The Egyptian government said that these revenues will be used to transform the cities along the Canal (Ismaïlia, Suez, and Port Said) into international trading centers. The government has also said that many new projects in the Suez province are being studied as a result of enlarging the Suez Canal capacity, such as building a new industrial zone, fish farms, and the completion of the Valley of Technology (wadi al thechnologia).

The project cost around 30 billion Egyptian pounds (approximately 4.2 billion dollars) and no foreign investors were allowed to invest in the project, but rather Egyptians were urged to participate in funding the project through bank certificates of deposit initially yielding 12%, later raised to 15.5%. The Egyptian Armed Forces participated in the project by helping in digging and designing the canal.

The enlarged capacity allows ships to sail in both directions at the same time over much of the canal's length. Beforehand, much of the canal was only one shipping lane wide, with limited wider basins for passing. This is expected to decrease waiting time from 11 hours to 3 hours for most ships, and to increase the capacity of the Suez Canal from 49 to 97 ships a day.

==== Progress ====
Technical difficulties initially arose, such as the flooding of the new canal through seepage from the existing canal. Nevertheless, work on the New Suez Canal was completed in July 2015. The channel was officially inaugurated with a ceremony attended by foreign leaders and featuring military flypasts on 6 August 2015, in accordance with the budgets laid out for the project.

Point	Coordinates
Northern End	30.718282°N 32.345982°E
Southern End	30.441385°N 32.355423°E

==== Benefits, costs, and risks ====
Egyptian officials, especially the chairman of the Suez Canal Authority, Vice-Admiral Mohab Mamish, stated that the $8.2 billion project, which expands capacity to 97 ships per day, will more than double annual revenues to some $13.5 billion by 2023. That, however, would require yearly growth of 10%. A recent forecast from the IMF suggests that in the decade up to 2016 the annual rate of growth for global merchandise trade will have averaged 3.4%.

About 18 scientists writing in the academic journal Biological Invasions in 2014 expressed concern about the project impacting the biodiversity and the ecosystem services of the Mediterranean Sea. They called on Egypt to assess the environmental effects that the canal expansion could cause, a request echoed by the executive secretary of the Convention on Biological Diversity. Over 1,000 invasive species have entered the Mediterranean Sea through the Suez Canal since its original construction in the mid-19th century, with human activities becoming a leading cause of the decline of the sea's biodiversity, according to the European Commission's Joint Research Centre.

Initially, the project was to be financed through a stock market IPO, allowing partial private ownership of the project. However, the government quickly changed its financing strategy, relying on interest-bearing investment certificates that do not confer any ownership rights to investors. The certificates were issued by the Suez Canal Authority with an interest rate of 12%.

==== Revenues ====
The government blocked access to the official revenues reports for three months after the opening. It then published two reports for August and September, which showed consecutive decreases in the total Suez Canal revenues by 10% or $150 million.

=== Seven new tunnels ===
In 2014, the former chairman of the Suez Canal Authority, Mohab Mamish, announced that seven new tunnels will be dug to connect the Sinai Peninsula to the Egyptian homeland. Three tunnels will be dug in Port Said (two for cars and one for railways) and four will be dug in Ismaïlia (two for cars, one for railways, and one for other special uses).

The tunnels will cost 4.2 billion dollars (approximately about 30 billion Egyptian pounds). The first three tunnels will cost 18 billion Egyptian pounds and Arab Contractors and Orascom are the builders for this project.

=== Floating bridge ===
The Al-Nasr floating bridge to enable easy travel between Port Said and Port Fouad was built successfully and inaugurated in late 2016. The bridge extends from opposite banks, with the help of tugboats that push both parts until they connect to form a bridge that can be traversed by cars. It is 420 metres (1,380 ft) long. This was an important step towards the efficient movement of equipment and manpower.

=== Technology Valley ===
The technology valley is an ongoing project that was paused for 17 years and now the government announced plans to continue the project. The project's location lies on the eastern part of Ismaïlia city and consists of four stages: the first stage covers 3,021 acres (1,223 ha), the second stage covers 4,082 acres (1,652 ha), the third stage covers 4,837 acres (1,957 ha), and the fourth stage covers 4,160 acres (1,680 ha). However, when the project started it completed only 108 acres and then was put on hold.

The completed technology valley will be the first step in starting Egypt's electronics industry for manufacturing technological devices.

=== Industrial Zone ===
The industrial zone project will cover 910 acres of land northwest of the Gulf of Suez. The first stage of the project covers 132 acres and it is done for 20 million Egyptian pounds. The second stage is 132 acres and it is not yet done. Currently, 23 factories are operating and 56 are still under construction. Upon finishing the project it will provide 9386 work opportunities.

The chairman of the Suez Canal authority also said that shipyards and services will be built along the Suez Canal corridor which includes: catering and services center for ships, a ship manufacturing and repair center, a center for manufacturing and repairing containers, and logistic redistribution centers.

=== New Ismailia City ===
This project will create "New Ismailia City", which will cover 16,500 acres of land. This new city will be created to accommodate approximately 500,000 Egyptians to relieve the pressure from the crowded towns of Cairo and the delta cities. The location of this city is designed to accommodate the workers of the nearby Wadi Al-thechnologia (Technology Valley) which will be built in the following years.

=== Fish Farming ===
Under the National Project for Fish Farming, new fish farms were built on the eastern side of the Suez Canal. The project includes twenty-three tanks that cover 120 square km with a depth of 3-5m. It covers the area from southern Tafrea to the Gulf of Suez. This project is designed to produce high-quality fish for food.

=== Russian Industrial Zone ===
During a state visit to Russia in 2014, President Sisi said that he had agreed with his Russian counterpart President Vladimir Putin to establish a Russian industrial zone in the new project. In May 2018, Egypt and Russia signed a 50-year agreement to construct the new industrial zone.

== Developing Existing Ports ==
=== West Port - Port Said West ===
West Port lies on the northern entrance of the Suez Canal and is considered one of the most important ports in Egypt because of its location on the entrance of the Suez Canal.

The port covers an area of 2.9 square km (the land area is 1.2 square km and the remaining 1.7 square km is water area). The port contains 37 docks which include docks for passengers, yachts, and general goods. The port is divided into stations and each station contains several docks with its working area (that includes repairing centers, equipment center, and stores). The maximum capacity of the port is 12 million tons yearly.

=== East Port - Port Said East ===
East Port lies on the northwestern entrance of the Suez Canal and is an important link between the East and Europe. The port was built in 2004 to serve international trading and act as a transit center between the continents.

The port borders the Mediterranean Sea from the north, the industrial zone from the south, the salty lakes from the east, and the Suez Canal branch from the west. The port covers an area of 35 square km.

The port authority plans to build docks that will reach 12 km long and an industrial zone south of the port covering 78 square km. Three stages are remaining to fully complete and improve the port:

- Stage one is creating 8 stations with docks 8 km long
- Stage two is creating 15 stations with docks 16 km long
- Stage three is creating 21 stations with docks 25 km long

=== Ain-Sokhna Port ===
Ain-Sokhna Port lies at the southern entrance of the Suez Canal.

The port's total size is 24,919,337.85 square m:

- 3,400,000 square m is the water area
- 21,519,337 square m is the land area
- 1,000,000 square m is the Customs center
- The largest dock size is 7 km long and 5.5 km wide

In 2008, DP World, an Emirati company bought the port and announced the plan to build a new 1.3 km dock to work with more than 1 million containers yearly. It also said that a general goods center will be built.

The port serves the oil and gas fields in the region. It exports products from the petrochemicals and refining factories in the Ain-Sokhna region. It also exports the products of a ceramic factory, an ammonia factory, and a sugar factory.

=== Arish Port ===
Arish Port lies on the Mediterranean Sea on the northern coast of Arish city. In 1996 the port was transformed from a fishing port into an international trade port.

The port contains a dock that is 242m long that can serve huge ships. There is another dock which is 122m long that serves smaller ships. The port also includes covered storage areas that cover 2 square km and non-covered storage areas which cover more than 2.7 square kilometres (1.0 sq mi). On 5 June 2014 the port was no longer controlled by the Port Said port authority, the Ministry of Defence took control of it due to its sensitive location. The port contains a lighthouse that can be seen from up to 18 miles (29 km). The main importance of the port is that it exports Sinai products to the Mediterranean countries.

New projects include:

- Build a 2 km dock which will include a containers station and a general goods station
- Build new storage areas
- Build a dock for yachts
- Build new logistic centers

=== El-Adabiya Port ===
El-Adabiya Port lies on the western side of the Suez Canal, about 17 km from Suez City. The Red Sea Ports Authority in Egypt controls the port.

El-Adabiya Port consists of 9 docks which reach 1840m long and 42–27 feet (12.8–8.2 m) deep. the water area is about 158 square km (which is also shared with the Suez Canal port and Petroleum Dock port) and the land area is 0.8 square km. The maximum carrying capacity of the port reaches 6.7 million tons yearly.

In 2014, the Suez Canal Corridor Project Authority announced that El-Adabiya Port will be improved after the completion of the new Suez Canal to serve more ships.

== See also ==
- Construction industry in Egypt
- Istanbul Canal

== Notes ==
Some of this article is from Rose al-Yūsuf magazine.
