= MV Tecam Sea =

History
- Name: Tecam Sea
- Owner: Sea Quality
- Port of registry: Nassau, Bahamas
- Builder: Hitachi Zosen, Innoshima, Japan
- Launched: 1 February 1984
- Completed: 1984
- Identification: IMO number: 8308824; Callsign: DYTT
- Fate: Scrapped 12 June 2012

General characteristics
- Tonnage: 17,056 gt
- Length: 178.21 m
- Draught: Forward: 9.3 m; Aft: 9.4 m
- Propulsion: One Sulzer diesel, 6RTA58, 8474 kW
- Crew: 21

The Motor Vessel Tecam Sea is a bulk carrier built in 1984. The ship was built by Hitachi Zosen shipyard in Innoshima, Japan, and purchased by Sea Quality, a shipping company based in Athens, Greece. The ship was involved in a collision with the M/V Federal Fuji in the port of Sorel, Quebec on 27 April 2000. The squat effect phenomenon is believed to be a factor in the collision.

The Tecam Sea, under Panamanian ownership, was involved in illegal oil-waste dumping off the Canadian coast on 8 Sept 2002, resulting in eight serious pollution charges. Due to improper handling of the case by authorities, the case was dismissed and charges were dropped.
