= Arab Academy for Science, Technology and Maritime Transport =

Private universisty in Alexandria and Cairo, Egypt

- الأكاديمية العربية للعلوم والتكنولوجيا والنقل البحري
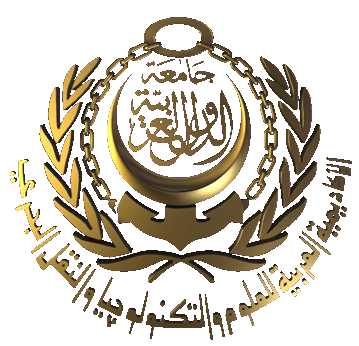
- AASTMT Logo
- Type: Diplomatic Organization
- Established: 1972
- Affiliations: UNIMED, IMO, Arab League
- Location: EG; 31.3099°N 30.0653°E
- Language: English
- Campuses: El Alamein, Sharjah, Alexandria, Cairo, Smart Village, Port Said, Aswan, Latakia
- Colors: Navy Blue
- Website: aast.edu

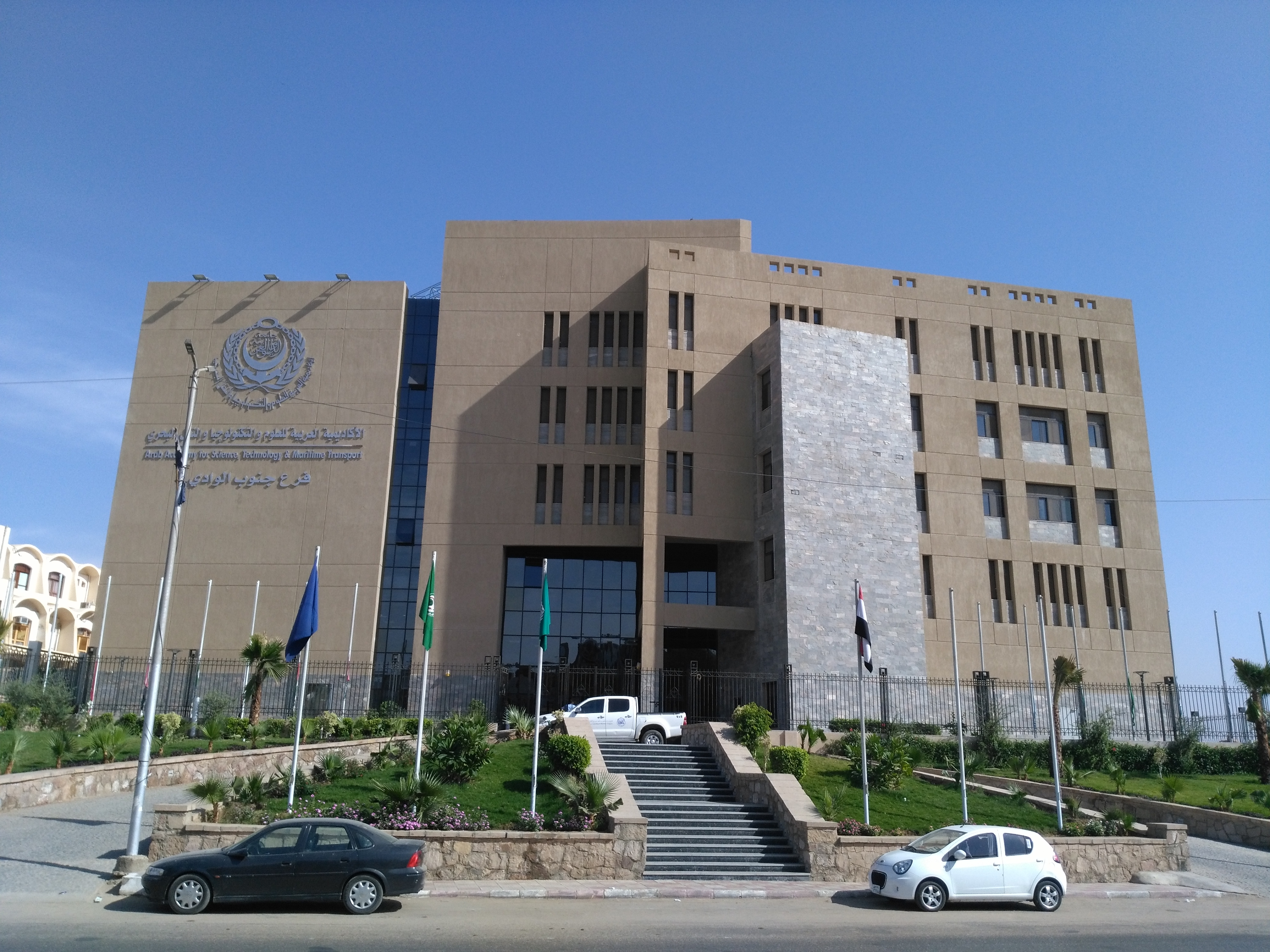
Arab Academy for Science, Technology & Maritime Transport

The Arab Academy for Science, Technology & Maritime Transport (AASTMT) or (AAST) (Arabic: الأكاديمية العربية للعلوم والتكنولوجيا والنقل البحري) is a regional university operated by the Arab League, which runs programs in marine transportation, business, and engineering. Most of its campuses are in Egypt. AASTMT started as a notion in the Arab League Transport Committee's meetings on 11 March 1970. The academy's inception was in 1972 in the city of Alexandria, Egypt. Later on, it expanded into Cairo.

== The Arab Academy for Science and Technology ==
AASTMT's name has become the Arab Academy for Science and Technology: "A university specialized in maritime transport and many other disciplines" and its certificates have been made equivalent to those granted by Egyptian universities.

== The Arab Academy for Science, Technology and Maritime Transport (AASTMT) ==
Over five years (from 1991 to 1996), the educational and maritime training services were funded by the Egyptian Ministry of Transport. Consequently, in 1992, the AASTMT was granted the training ship, "Aida 4", as a donation from the Japanese government.

In 1994 the AASTMT was awarded the simulator (completed in two phases) by the USA administration. Cooperation with the American counterpart continued to found an advanced technology center. Scholarships have exceeded 120,000 for students from 58 countries.

The World Bank has chosen the AASTMT from four international organizations representing the Norwegian Swedish Group, the Hungarian Group and the Danish Group to develop maritime education in Bangladesh by a limited tender.

In October 1996 modified its title from: "The Arab Academy for Science and Technology: A university specialized in maritime transport." to "The Arab Academy for Science, Technology and Maritime Transport" (AASTMT).

== Certificates ==
The AASTMT has obtained the approval of the Egyptian Supreme Council of Universities for considering the holders of the High Seas Second Officer eligible for affiliation with any Egyptian University or any four-year higher education entity which a student can join after high school.

University rankings

Global – Overall
- QS World: 1001-1200 (2026)

The AASTMT has flexibility in the process of transferring marine officers from vocational studies to that which allows them to obtain the bachelor's degree in Marine Navigation Technology. This is due to the application of the American Credit Hours System. In order to show the importance of this achievement, the holder of the High Seas Captain certificate, when sent to the United Kingdom to obtain the bachelor's degree, had to start his studies over regardless of his previous studies. However, due to the flexibility of the current system the AASTMT applies, it opened the door for its officers to obtain the bachelor's degree as well as the eligibility certificate in four years.

== Services and student activities ==
Dormitory, hostel, and restaurant services are available. The girls' hostel may house up to 100 girls.

In addition to tours and athletic activities, the Cultural Activities Department organizes seminars and talks. The annual Parents Day is organized by students.

Marwa Elselehdar, a graduate of the Department of Maritime Transport and Technology, is Egypt's first female sea captain. She works on the Egyptian government's training ship, the Aida IV (IMO: 9018775).

== Community service programmes and continuous education ==
AASTMT offers educational programmes to serve the community of Alexandria.

The programmes start-over every three months, and run all year round. They are carried out at the AASTMT headquarters in Miami, Sidi Bishr and downtown. The programmes are offered according to an evening schedule. The courses are sometimes designed for groups of employees in a company or organizations. The estimated number of those benefiting from these programmes throughout the year, ranges from 15,000 to 20,000 Alexandrians. There are summer courses for the education of children which benefit around 5,000 children.

== Colleges ==
- Maritime Transport & Technology
- College of Archaeology and Cultural Heritage
- College of Engineering & Technology
- College of Management & Technology
- College of Computing & Information Technology
- College of International Transport & Logistics
- College of Language & Communication
- College of Fisheries Technology & Aquaculture
- College of Pharmacy
- College of Law
- College of Dental Medicine
- College of Artificial Intelligence
- College of Medicine
- Graduate School of Business

These colleges can be in Arabic, English or French languages.

== Institutes ==
- Maritime Safety Institute Alexandria.
- Productivity & Quality Institute Alexandria.
- Technical & Vocational Institute Alexandria.
- Institute of International Transport & Logistics Alexandria & Cairo.
- Port training Institute Alexandria & Port Said.
- Institute for Language Studies Alexandria & Cairo.
- Investment & Finance Institute Alexandria.
- Arab Institute for Trade & Commodities Exchange Alexandria.
- Maritime Upgrading Studies Institute Alexandria.

== Centers ==
- International Examination Center Alexandria.
- Academy Publishing Center
- Strategic Marketing & Entrepreneurship Center
- Industry Service Center Alexandria.
- Marine Hotel Center Alexandria.
- Information and Documentation Center Alexandria.
- Multimedia Center Alexandria.
- Regional informatics Center Alexandria.
- Computer Services Center Alexandria.
- Computer Networks & Data Center Alexandria.
- Research & Consultation Center Alexandria & Portsaid.
- Business Development Center Alexandria.
- Regional Center for Disaster Risk reduction Alexandria.
- Arab Center for Transport Study Alexandria.
- Arab Center for Media Alexandria.
- Maritime Certificates Renewal
- International Maritime Transport Forum
- Agreements and International Cooperations Center

== Deaneries ==
- International Education Programs Deanery Alexandria.
- Community Service and Continuing Education Alexandria.
- Deanery of Postgraduate Studies Alexandria.
- Deanery of Student Affairs Alexandria.
- Deanery of Sports Alexandria.

== Complexes ==
- Integrated Simulators Complex Alexandria & Portsaid.
- International Maritime Organization Compound Alexandria.

== Campuses ==
- Alexandria (Main HeadQuarter).
- Dokki.
- Heliopolis.
- Port Said.
- South Valley
- Smart Village
- El Alamein

Abroad:

- Lattakia

== See also ==
- Colleges and Universities in Alexandria
- Education in Egypt
- List of universities in Egypt
