= Marwa Elselehdar =

Egyptian ship captain

- Born: 1990s Egypt
- Alma mater: Arab Academy for Science; Cardiff Metropolitan University
- Occupation: Sea captain

Marwa Elselehdar (sometimes written El-Selehdar; Arabic: مروة السلحدار) is the first Egyptian female ship captain. She graduated from the Arab Academy for Science, Technology & Maritime Transport in 2013, the first female graduate of the Department of Maritime Transport and Technology, and as of April 2021 has a rank of first mate on the Aida IV.

== Life ==
She was born in Egypt in 1991 or 1992 (age 33–34), and has a brother. Both she and her brother enrolled at the Arab Academy for Science, Technology & Maritime Transport (AASTMT), she in the International Transport and Logistics Department and he in the Department of Maritime Transport and Technology, which only accepted men at the time. She later applied to DMTT anyway, and after a legal review by Hosni Mubarak she was allowed to join, becoming the only woman amongst 1200 students. She faced sexism throughout her studies, but graduated in 2013, and later rose to the rank of First Mate.

She became Egypt's first female ship captain when she captained the first vessel through the expanded Suez Canal in 2015, the MV Aida IV; she was the youngest and first Egyptian female captain to do so. She was honoured by Abdel Fattah el-Sisi in 2017 during Egypt's Women's Day celebrations. She will take her final exam to attain the rank of captain in May 2021.

She also has a Masters in Business Administration from Cardiff Metropolitan University.

== Ever Given rumours ==
When the Ever Given caused a blockage of the Suez Canal in 2021, social media propagated rumours about her being the captain and responsible for the incident. However the rumors were incorrect, since at the time of the incident she was first mate of the Aida IV, which was hundreds of miles away in Alexandria. Aida IV is an Egyptian maritime safety authority vessel which runs supply missions to a Red Sea lighthouse and for training cadets at AASTMT.
