= Bank effect =

Tendency of the stern of a ship making way to swing toward the near bank

The influence of speed and distance to bank on bank effects.

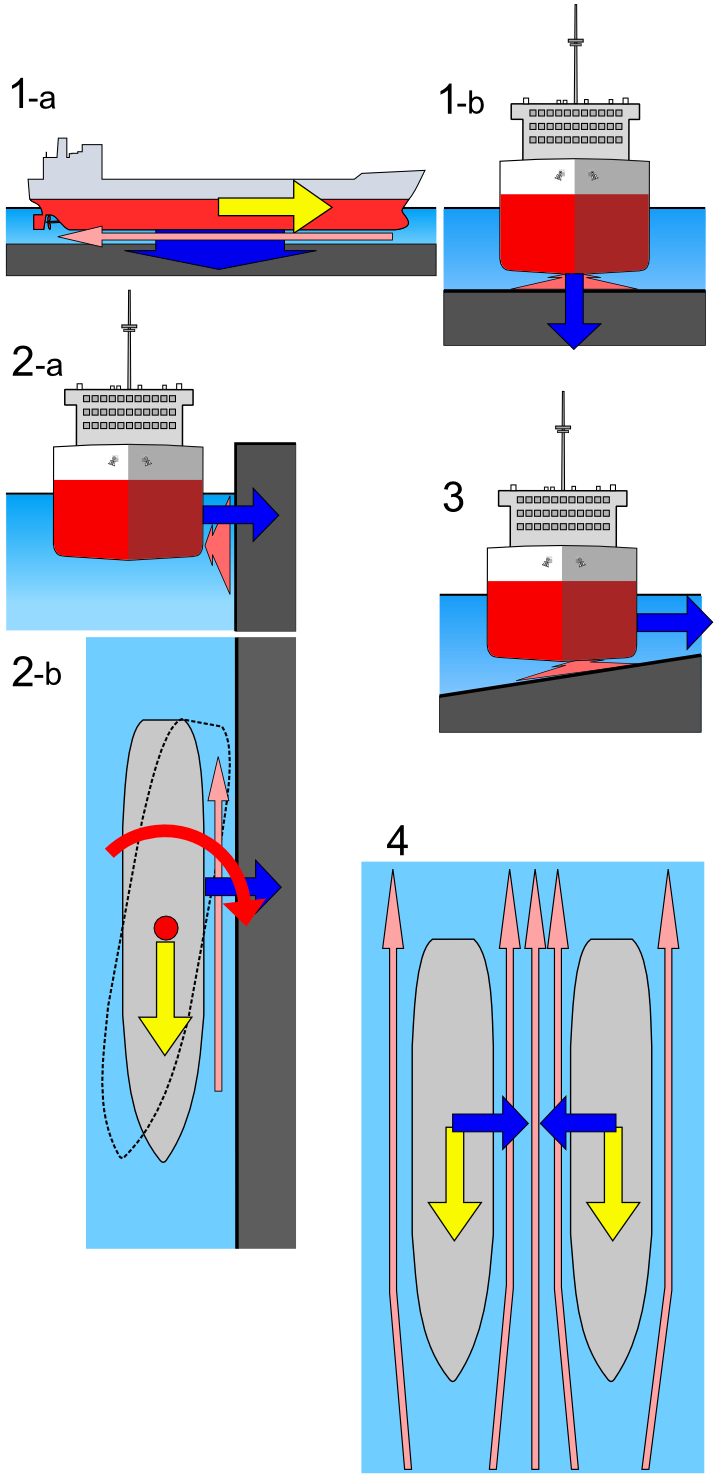
Impact of restricted waterways: 1-a, 1-b: Shallow water 2-a, 2-b: Side wall: 3. Inclined seafloor; 4. Ship approach

The bank effect (channel effect, bank suction, bank cushion, stern suction, ship-bank interaction) is the tendency of the stern of a ship to swing toward the near bank when operating in a river or constricted waterway.

== Phenomenon ==
The asymmetric flow around a ship induced by the vicinity of banks causes pressure differences (Bernoulli's principle) between port and the starboard sides. As a result, a lateral force will act on the ship, mostly directed towards the closest bank, as well as a yawing moment pushing her bow towards the centre of the waterway. The squat effect increases due to the decreased blockage.

This phenomenon depends on many parameters, such as bank shape, water depth, ship-bank distance, ship properties, ship speed and propeller action. A reliable estimation of bank effects is important for determining the limiting conditions in which a ship can safely navigate a waterway.

== Examples ==
It was cited as a possible cause of the 2021 Suez Canal obstruction by the cargo ship Ever Given.

== See also ==
- Coandă effect – Tendency of a fluid jet to stay attached to a surface of any form
- Bernoulli's principle – Principle relating to fluid dynamics
- Continuity equation – Equation describing the transport of some quantity
- Squat effect – Effect of reduced pressure under a hull making way, causing a downward displacement
