= Squat effect =

Effect of reduced pressure under a hull making way, causing a downward displacement

The squat effect is the hydrodynamic phenomenon by which a vessel moving through shallow water creates an area of reduced pressure that causes the ship to increase its draft (alternatively decrease the underkeel clearance of the vessel in marine terms) and thereby be closer to the seabed than would otherwise be expected. This phenomenon is caused by the water flow which accelerates as it passes between the hull and the seabed in confined waters, the increase in water velocity causing a resultant reduction in pressure. Squat effect from a combination of vertical sinkage and a change of trim may cause the vessel to dip towards the stern or towards the bow. This is understood to be a function of the Block coefficient of the vessel concerned, finer lined vessels Cb <0.7 squatting by the stern and vessels with a Cb >0.7 squatting by the head or bow.

Squat effect is approximately proportional to the square of the speed of the ship. Thus, by reducing speed by half, the squat effect is reduced by a factor of four. Squat effect is usually felt more when the depth/draft ratio is less than four or when sailing close to a bank. It can lead to unexpected groundings and handling difficulties. There are indications of squat which mariners and ship pilots should be aware of such as vibration, poor helm response, shearing off course, change of trim and a change in wash.

Squat effect is included by navigators in under keel clearance calculations.

== Marine incidents ==
It was a cause of the 7 August 1992 grounding of the Queen Elizabeth 2 (QE2) off Cuttyhunk Island, near Martha's Vineyard. The liner's speed at the time was 24 knots (12 m/s) and the draft was 32 feet (9.8 m). The rock upon which the vessel grounded was an uncharted shoal later determined to be 34.5 feet (10.5 m), which should have given her room to spare, were it not for the "squat effect." U.S. National Transportation Safety Board investigators found that the QE2's officers significantly underestimated the amount the increase in speed would increase the ship's squat. The officers allowed for 2 feet (0.61 m) of squat in their calculations, but the NTSB concluded that squat at that speed and depth would have been between 4.5 and 8 feet (1.4 and 2.4 m).

Squat is also mentioned as a factor in the collision of the bulk carriers Tecam Sea and Federal Fuji in the port of Sorel, Quebec, in April 2000.

The third largest cruise ship in the world, MS Oasis of the Seas, used this effect to obtain an extra margin of clearance between the vessel and the Great Belt bridge, Denmark, 1 November 2009, on a voyage from the shipyard in Turku, Finland to Florida, USA. The new cruise liner passed under the bridge at 20 knots (37 km/h) in the shallow channel, giving the ship extra clearance due to a 30 cm squat.
