= MV Federal Fuji =

Japanese bulk carrier

History
- Name: Federal Fuji
- Owner: Viken Lakers
- Port of registry: Nassau, Bahamas
- Builder: Nippon Kokan Shimizu, Japan
- Completed: 1986
- Identification: IMO number: 8321931

General characteristics
- Tonnage: 17,814 gt 29,531 dwt
- Length: 182.8 m
- Draught: Forward: 10.08 m; Aft: 10.09 m
- Propulsion: One Sulzer diesel, 6RTA58, 6988 kW
- Crew: 22

The Motor Vessel Federal Fuji is a bulk carrier built in 1986, by Nippon Kokan in Shimizu, Japan. The ship was built for Viken Lakers, based in Bergen, Norway. The Federal Fuji was involved in a collision with the M/V Tecam Sea in the port of Sorel, Quebec on 27 April 2000. The squat effect phenomenon is believed to be a factor in the collision.

Between 1993 and 1994, Federal Fuji was caught illegally dumping oil off the Canadian coast. The ship was flying a German flag at the time, and her owners were fined $25,000.
