= Mohab Mamish =

Egyptian admiral

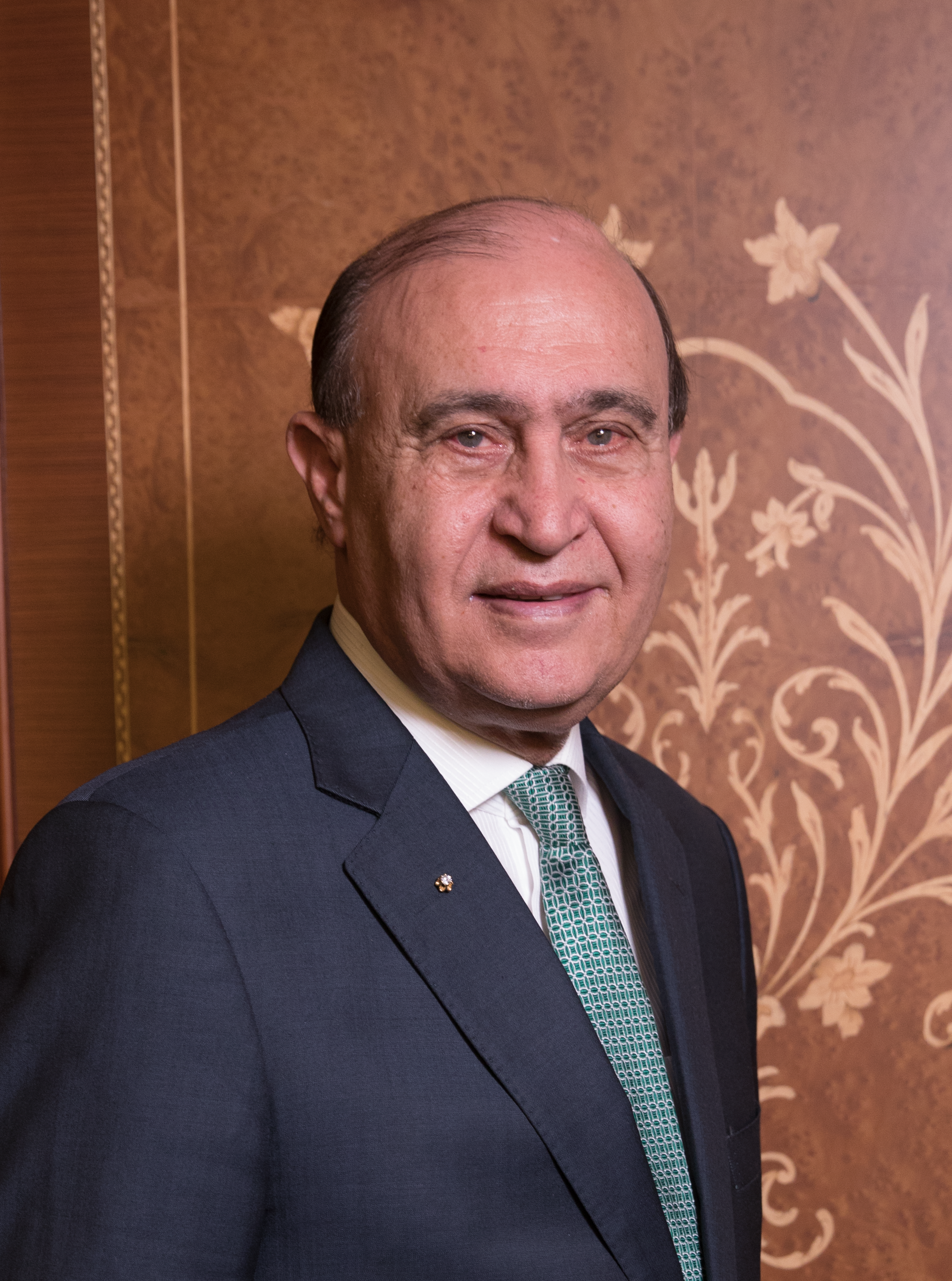

6th Chairman of the Suez Canal Authority
- In office 12 August 2012 – 16 August 2019
- Deputy: Osama Rabie
- Preceded by: Osama Rabie

Personal details
- Born: August 6, 1948 (age 77) Alexandria, Egypt
- Children: Fatma; Amira

Military service
- Allegiance: Egypt
- Branch/service: Egyptian Navy
- Years of service: 1969–2012
- Rank: Admiral
- Commands: Commander-in-Chief of the Egyptian Navy (2007–2012)
- Battles/wars: Yom Kippur War

Vice Admiral Mohab Mamish (Arabic: مهاب مميش; born 6 August 1948) was the chairman of the Suez Canal Authority. He was the Commander of the Egyptian Navy from 27 September 2007 until August 2012. He was also a member of the Supreme Council of the Armed Forces which de facto governed Egypt after the Egyptian Revolution of 2011.

== Biography ==
Mamish graduated from the Egyptian Naval Academy in 1969. He served as an anti-submarine specialist in the 1973 War. He received a fellowship from the Nasser Military Academy in 1977. He has received additional military training in the United Kingdom (1980), the United States of America (1983, 1992, 1995, 1998, 2004), the United Arab Emirates (1987–1989), China (1992), Greece (1999), and France (2002).

He has received many medals, including the medal of long and Meritorious Service, of Longevity, of Duty, of the 6th of October, of the Egyptian Navy, of the 20th Anniversary of the July Revolution, of the 25th of April, of October Warriors, of Superior Service, 23 July 50th Anniversary, and the Silver Jubilee of Sinai Liberation.

He is married, with two daughters.
