= Osama Rabie =

Egyptian admiral and transport executive

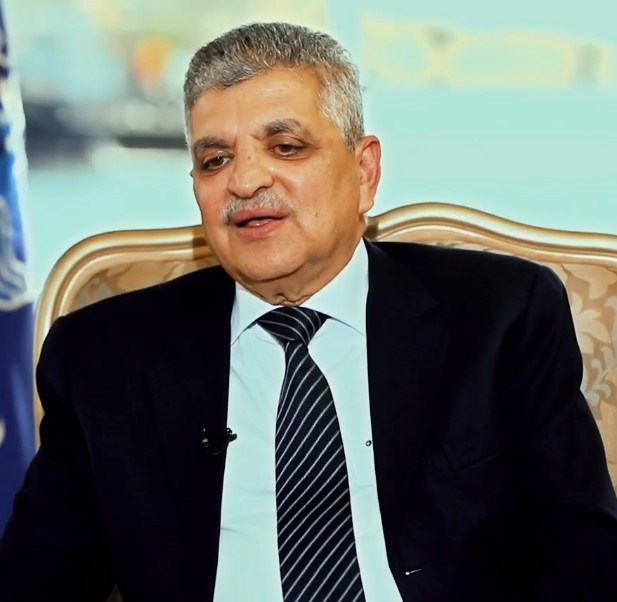

7th Chairman of the Suez Canal Authority
- Incumbent
- Assumed office 17 August 2019
- Deputy: Ashraf Ibrahim Atwa
- Preceded by: Mohab Mamish

Personal details
- Born: Osama Mounier Mohamed Rabie; 15 June 1955 (age 71) Zefta, Gharbia, Egypt

Lieutenant General (Vice Admiral) Osama Mounier Mohamed Rabie is an Egyptian national who is the chairman and managing director of the Suez Canal Authority.

== Biography ==
Rabie was born in 1955. He studied at the Egyptian Naval Academy and graduated in 1977.

His former positions include Commander of the Minesweeper Group, Chief of Staff of the Mine Action Brigade and Commander of the Marine Arts Pavilion at the Egyptian Naval Academy.

In April 2005, he assumed command of the Egyptian Navy. He served as head of the Navy until December 2016 when he became vice president of the Suez Canal Authority.

On August 17, 2019, he succeeded Mohab Mamish as Chairman of the Suez Canal Authority. In 2021, following the grounding of the Ever Given Rabie announced that the Egyptian authorities would seek financial compensation due to the impact and delays caused by the ship grounding and ordered the seizure of the ship until an agreement was reached. Following a later US$550 million settlement, Rabie had said the agreement was amicable but that the incident, resulting from human error, would not be allowed to happen again.

In June 2022, he received a large diplomatic delegation of ambassadors from 30 different States. In August 2022, he met with representatives of Maersk and the Port of Rotterdam and signed a bilateral agreement on areas of common interest.

In August 2023, his tenure as chairman was extended.

In February 2025, he said that the Red Sea crisis had not diminished the importance of the Suez Canal and that shipping numbers had improved from the worst point of the crisis.

== Honours ==
In 2020, he received the SEATRADE Outstanding Achievement Award.
