= Kerolos Bahgat =

Egyptian writer

- Born: 1992 (age 33–34); Egypt
- Education: Bachelor's degree in Medicine and Surgery
- Alma mater: Ain Shams University
- Occupations: Writer, assistant surgeon
- Writing career
- Language: Arabic
- Genres: Psychology, philosophy, satire, irony

Kerolos Bahgat (born 1992) is an Egyptian writer and assistant surgeon at El-Demerdash hospital. He is well known for his satirical style of writing in the field of psychology, as portrayed in his book The Thought Experiment for Mama's Boy, among many others. His works were published by a number of publishing firms including Dar Toya For Publishing and Distributing and The Book Home Bookstore.

== Personal life ==
Bahgat has not always been passionate about writing. Rather, he enjoyed acting, and played a number of roles throughout his university years before deciding to stop to better focus on his education. Upon graduating, Bahgat had to find the means to ease up the physical and psychological pressures resulting from his profession as an assistant surgeon, and, hence, decided to pursue writing. Unlike his audience, Bahgat believes that writing and medicine complement one another, for writing allows him to better understand the human soul, as well as brings him peace of mind.

== Education ==
Bahgat enrolled in Ain Shams University Faculty of Medicine, where he obtained his bachelor's degree in medicine and surgery.

== Career ==
At the start of the Egyptian revolution in 2011, Bahgat found inspiration in the surrounding events and adopted a critical eye when writing about the behavioral patterns of the Egyptian citizens, as well as his own. However, seeing that his content was not purposeful, he shifted to more scientific topics. He published an article titled "The Concept of Frowning in Russian Literature," which did not gain much recognition despite the efforts devoted to composing the piece. Bahgat then decided to observe the writing styles of different writers in the field of psychology, and took notes of the comments given by their audience. He was able to conclude that readers are more inclined to engage with writings composed in urban slang, because it is easier to understand. Therefore, Bahgat laid out his writings in ironic, humorous slang, and posted his work on his social media accounts, namely Facebook, which slowly built up to his fame.

As a result of the pain he experienced throughout his life, Bahgat decided to specialize in the field of psychology. In attempts to analyze his symptoms and, consequently, change the societal perception of psychiatric patients, he delved deep into psychological concepts and theories, and worked on interpreting human emotions. However, regardless of his passion in the field of psychology, Bahgat explains, in an interview with Sherif Madkour, anchor for Kalam Khafif radio and TV program, that he chose not to specialize in the field of psychiatry on a vocational level, for it is difficult to discern human psychology and diagnose the symptoms of a mental illness accurately.

Owing to his activity on his social media accounts, some of Bahgat's followers reached out to him about their problems in attempt to better understand its different aspects and arrive at solutions. Likewise, Bahgat followed the same rhythm when composing his books, including his first book, The Thought Experiment for Mama's Boy. In addition, Bahgat specialized in the field of philosophy.

From among the many scientific forums that Bahgat attended was the annual Egyptian Science Week organized by the American University in Cairo, whose goal is to help facilitate the comprehension of sciences. In the forum, Bahgat gave a speech accounting his experience with folk psychology.

Bahgat talks about publishing more of his own works in the future, but fears that the stress resulting from his career might impede him from achieving so.

== His views ==
Bahgat believes that writing, like any form of art, bestows the writer with the opportunity to freely express himself, or herself, and the recipient, be it a reader or a fellow writer, are ought to tolerate the views and opinions of the author. While the more acceptable ideas in the society prevail, others become trends and fade away with time. However, once he submitted his latest book for publication, Bahgat was attacked for naming the book Islam is the Solution. He was hesitant to change the title because he believed he was giving up his freedom of speech. Contrary to that the title implies, Bahgat highlights in his book the freedom to practice any action as long as the practitioner is knowledgeable enough about the rights from wrongs, and that Bahgat came about with this title to serve the purpose of irony. However, seeing that the content of the book was the most crucial factor, Bahgat had to change the title to The Forbidden Experience for Mama's Boy. He also learned that, as a writer himself, he is obligated to respect the regulations imposed by the higher authorities, seeing that they are more aware of the dangers posed by the title of the book on particular groups within the society.

He encourages people to read, and warns against books, especially scientific ones, that seem to be rich in content, but, in fact, resemble that of myths. Likewise, to be knowledgeable enough in the fields of psychology and philosophy, Bahgat resolved to reading and conducting researches before attempting to write. He created a reservoir of simplified scientific concepts which he can use for his writings. Bahgat found inspiration in the works of many psychologists, including such as Sigmund Freud and, his daughter, Anna Freud. He used Oedipus complex, coined by Freud, to explain the duality in actions that occur when an individual practices his faith, namely Islam. He demonstrates that the duality arises as result of a clash between an individual's pedagogical principles and his Instinctive behavioral patterns. To elaborate, Bahgat refers to the duality that Egyptian men experience when choosing their companion. Naturally, an Egyptian man admires a social woman until she becomes his wife. He feels that his manhood is under threat as a result of his wife's success in establishing social relationships. Thus, he is unable to achieve compatibility between the principles on which he was raised, which calls for choosing a conservative wife, devoted only to him, and his instincts that appreciates a woman in her social context. Consequently, Bahgat deduces that such duality impedes the proper practice of religion. In an attempt to fighting his, or her, lusts, an individual resorts to superficial practices that are usually represented in the form of religious rites. This leads him, or her, to think of himself, or herself, as pious. In reality, however, pious individuals are those who adhere to properly constructing their essence away from superficial behaviors. Bahgat presents these social and philosophical ideas in a simplified manner, and, hence, narrates it in colloquial Egyptian dialect.

Bahgat found in his ironic style of writing and the title of his books a way of marketing his own works. Despite the numerous claims made against his sarcastic book titles, namely those titles with the phrase "mama’s boy," Bahgat insisted on not changing them because it is that that makes the book memorable, even if readers were not purchase it. He came about with the phrase "mama’s boy" when he was sitting one day with one of his friends, complaining to him about his worldly troubles, to which his friend responded saying "quit being a mama’s boy and toughen up!" Bahgat explains that the phrase "mama’s boy" is not considered an offense in itself, but gained its negative collocation as a result of the society's perception towards hot-headed, depressed individuals.

Bahgat is disappointed with the level of ignorance in Egypt, which is owed to two main reasons. Firstly, medical graduates of Egyptian universities differ from those in foreign countries in terms of their qualifications to work. Contrary to those in foreign countries, surgical graduates in Egypt are allowed to work in teaching hospitals and treat patients, regardless of their age, educational level and professional experience. This may result in a high risk of committing errors. Therefore, Bahgat calls for the need for vocational training and psychological rehabilitation, most importantly, for all surgical graduates, so that they are able to successfully acknowledge their patient's emotional wellbeing. Secondly, Egyptian citizens are irregular when it comes to conducting medical checkups. Bahgat recalls an incident when he asked for radiographic images from one of his patients, who, instead, sent him personal photos of herself.

== Works ==
- The Thought Experiment for Mama's Boy (original title: Al-Tagruba Al-Fikriyah l-Rooh Umm-uh), Dar Toya For Publishing and Distributing, Cairo, 2016. In 2013, Bahgat drafted his first copy of the book. However, it was not until three years later that he managed to publish the final copy, which was delayed as a result of the ongoing mockery by publishing houses and readers regarding the title and content of the book. The publication of the book was owed to his discussion of different psychological subjects on a number of social media websites, and his followers later composing his social media posts into a book. Unlike complicated psychology books, the book provides an overview of simplified, superficial psychological concepts by analyzing articles extracted from scientific websites, and translated by Bahgat, and illustrates such concepts by giving examples from real-life events. Few of the topics discussed include the Cinderella complex and frog psychology. The book was rated good in terms of its simple style of writing and the variety of topics discussed.
- Egg Man (original title: Beidah Man), Dar Toya For Publishing and Distributing, Cairo, 2017.
- The Indifferent (original title: Al-La Muktareth), Dar Toya For Publishing and Distributing, Cairo, 2018.
- Sex Partner (original title: Al-Rafeeq Siko Siko), Dar Toya For Publishing and Distributing, Cairo, 2018. This book boldly brings to light topics, such as love and sex, to which society turns a blind eye. It enlightens one on how to understand and identify his, or her, feelings, and separate between their emotions. After initially naming the book Do not Expect Anything from Love, Bahgat changes it to Sex Partner to cover more topics beyond those limited to love.
- The Forbidden Experience for Mama's Boy (original title: Al-Tagruba Al-Mahdurah l-Rooh Umm-uh), Dar Toya For Publishing and Distributing, Cairo, 2020. Bahgat, who is of Christian faith, was heavily criticized for initially naming the book Islam is the Solution. While some people speculated that Bahgat's intention was to compose a parody religion book, others hoped that it was a narration of his journey as a Muslim convert. Regardless of such speculations, through the title of the book, Bahgat was referring to a group of individuals who strongly advocate a certain idea, and use force against those who oppose them intellectually. The phrase Islam is the Solution was originally a slogan used among banned religious and political parties. As a result of the instability plaguing Egypt, and the citizens’ combat against different types of terrorism, the state administration requested Bahgat to change the title of his book. Through his new title, Bahgat eliminate the process of forbidding ideas, rather work on addressing them.
