= Ahmad Bahgat =

Egyptian writer and journalist

- Born: 15 November 1932; Cairo, Egypt
- Died: 11 December 2011 (aged 79)
- Title: Novelist, journalist

Ahmed Shafiq Bahgat (Arabic: أحمد شفيق بهجت) was an Egyptian writer and journalist, born in Cairo on 15 November 1932 and died on 11 December 2011. He had a bachelor's degree in law from Cairo University.

== Career ==
Bahgat held the following positions during his career

- Journalist in Akhbar al-Youm newspaper (1955)
- Journalist in Sabah al-Khair magazine (1957)
- Journalist at al-Ahram newspaper (1958)
- Chairman and Chief Editor of the Radio and Television magazine (1976)
- Deputy lead editor for technical affairs at al-Ahram magazine since 1982

== Public opinion ==
In 1982, Dar al-Shorouk organized a ceremony for the 77th birthday of the writer. Among the attendees was the chairman of the board of directors at Dar al-Shorouk, who pointed out in his speech that Dar al-Shorouk had printed out 32 versions of Ahmed Bahgat's book The Prophets of God. The Egyptian Newspaper Dar al-Shorouk had also quoted the novelist Alaa’ al-Aswany saying that he found for himself a role-model in the writings and the character of the writer, Ahmed Bahgat.

Al-Aswany also added that Ahmed Bahgat's column in the newspaper, The Box of the World has raised many generations. Ahmed Bahgat had the ability to present his extremely detailed ideas in very few lines. Furthermore, al-Aswany talked about Ahmed Bahgat's short story collection, A Second of Love which he said he could talk for hours about each and every story in it, in addition to his book Animal Stories in the Quran in which the writer was not satisfied with mentioning the stories as they are, and he added his own artistic touch to them.

Meanwhile, the writer Bilal Fadl expressed his regret towards his friendship with the director Khaled Ahmad Bahgat who he befriended to get through to his father Ahmad Bahgat. Bilal Fadl felt indebted to the writer Ahmad Bahgat who played a significant role in his childhood. Bilal Fadl was born in a household that only consumed religious books that was often accompanied with his father scolding him. He only started feeling differently about religious books when he was handed Ahmad Bahgat's book, The Prophet's of God. Only then did he learn that a religious person can still be simple and understand while delivering religious knowledge. Bilal Fadl added that Ahmad Bahgat's book, The Diary of a Fasting Person was a book that he could not stop going back to. Egyptian writer and analyst Mohamed Hassanain Haykal considered Ahmad Bahgat to be a unique journalist, and he chose him to cover the visit of President Gamal Abdel Nasser to al-Ahram. In a reply to Ahmad Bahgat said that every good thing he wrote was inspired by Haykal, including his book The Diary of a Fasting person and his newspaper column, The Box of The World in which he wrote daily and which was getting published in al-Ahram Egyptian newspaper.

== Radio ==
Ahmad Bahgat was the producer of the famous radio program Two Words Only which was presented by Fouad al-Mohandis. His radio program continued to be presented for 30 years on the public radio program, From Cairo. The purposed of the show was to critique the negative aspects of society and to shed light on important issues.

== Literary works ==
- A Husband's Dairy (original title: Mothakerat Zawj)
- The Diary of a Fasting Person (original title: Mothakerat Sai’im)
- The Prophets of God (original title: Anbiya’ Allah)
- The Best Stories (original title: Ahsan al-Qisas)
- The Path to Allah (original title: al-Tareeq ela Allah)
- Yousuf’s Shirt (original title: Qamees Yousuf)
- Allah in the Islamic Faith (original title: Allah fe al-Aqida al-Islamiya)
- The Sufi’s Sailor of Love (original title: Bahar al-Hob ‘end al-Soufiya)
- The Stories of Animals in the Quran (original title: Qisas al-Haywan fe al-Quran)
- (we are) Fasting… and God Knows best (original title: Sa’imoun wa Allah A’lam)
- A Dialogue Between a Naïve Child and an Educated Cat. (original title: Hewar Bayn Tefl Sathaj wa Qet Muthaqaf)
- Tuthmosis 400 with a hyphen (original title: Tahtamos 400 be Sharta)
- A Second of Love (original title: Thaniya Waheda men al-Hob)
- Observations on the Purity of the Universe (original title: Ta’amulat fe Othobat al-Kawn)
- Saleh’s Camel (original title: Naqat Saleh)
- Abraha’s Elephant (original title: Feel Abraha)
- Yunus’ whale (original title: Hut Yunus)
- Suleiman's Hoopoe (original title: Hodhod Sulaiman)
- Kind Talut and the River (original title: al-Malik Talut was al-Nahr)
- A Traveller's Observations (original title: Ta’amulat Musafer)
- The Tale of Adam's Two Sons and the Crow (original title: Naba’ Bani Adam wa al-Ghurab)

== Death ==
Ahmad Bahgat died on 11 December 2011, after a long struggle with illness.
