= Suez Canal Authority =

Egyptian government agency that owns, operates, and maintains the Suez Canal

- Abbreviation: SCA
- Predecessor: Suez Canal Company
- Formation: July 26, 1956; 70 years ago
- Type: Governmental agency
- Purpose: Managing the Suez Canal
- Headquarters: Ismailia, Egypt
- Coordinates: 30°35′18″N 32°16′57″E
- Chairman: Osama Mounier Rabie
- Deputy Chairman: Ashraf Ibrahim Atwa
- Website: www.suezcanal.gov.eg

Suez Canal Authority (SCA; Arabic: هيئة قناة السويس) is an Egyptian state-owned authority which owns, operates and maintains the Suez Canal. Founded in 1956, following the nationalization of the canal and the Suez Canal Company by the Egyptian government, the Authority is responsible for managing, exploiting, maintaining, and improving the Suez Canal. It is also exclusively responsible for issuing regulations related to navigation in the Suez Canal and other regulations necessary for the proper functioning of the facility.

The Suez Canal Authority has a board of directors whose chairman and members are appointed, dismissed, and have their salaries and bonuses determined by a decree issued by the President of Egypt. The Authority levies fees for navigation and transit through the canal, as well as fees for pilotage, towing, mooring, and other related services, in accordance with applicable laws and regulations.

The Authority has an independent budget, prepared according to the rules governing commercial enterprises. The fiscal year begins on July 1st and ends on June 30th of each year.

== Establishment and organization ==
SCA is an independent authority having legal personality. It was established by the nationalization act signed on 26 July 1956 by the Egyptian president Gamal Abdel Nasser. The act at the same time nationalized the Suez Canal Company and transferred all its assets and employees to the SCA established by this act.

The head office is located in Ismailia. In Port Said the administration building of the earlier Suez Canal Company is used. Its board of directors comprises 14 persons, including the chairman and managing director.

== Assets, duties and responsibilities ==
SCA owns the Suez Canal and all areas, buildings and equipment pertaining thereto. It issues the Rules of Navigation, specifies the tolls for the use of the canal and collects them. The tolls are expressed in XDR and collected in USD, GBP, EUR and other currencies. In 2008, the toll revenue was 5.381 billion USD for the passage of 21,415 vessels, resulting in an average toll of 251, 314.5 USD per vessel.

SCA is responsible for the operation and maintenance of the Suez Canal, for the safety of the traffic and for all other matters relating thereto. According to the nationalisation act, SCA is bound by the 1888 Convention of Constantinople, which grants the right of free access and use of the canal at equal conditions to all ships, commercial ships and ships of war, in times of peace or of war, even to ships of belligerent parties.

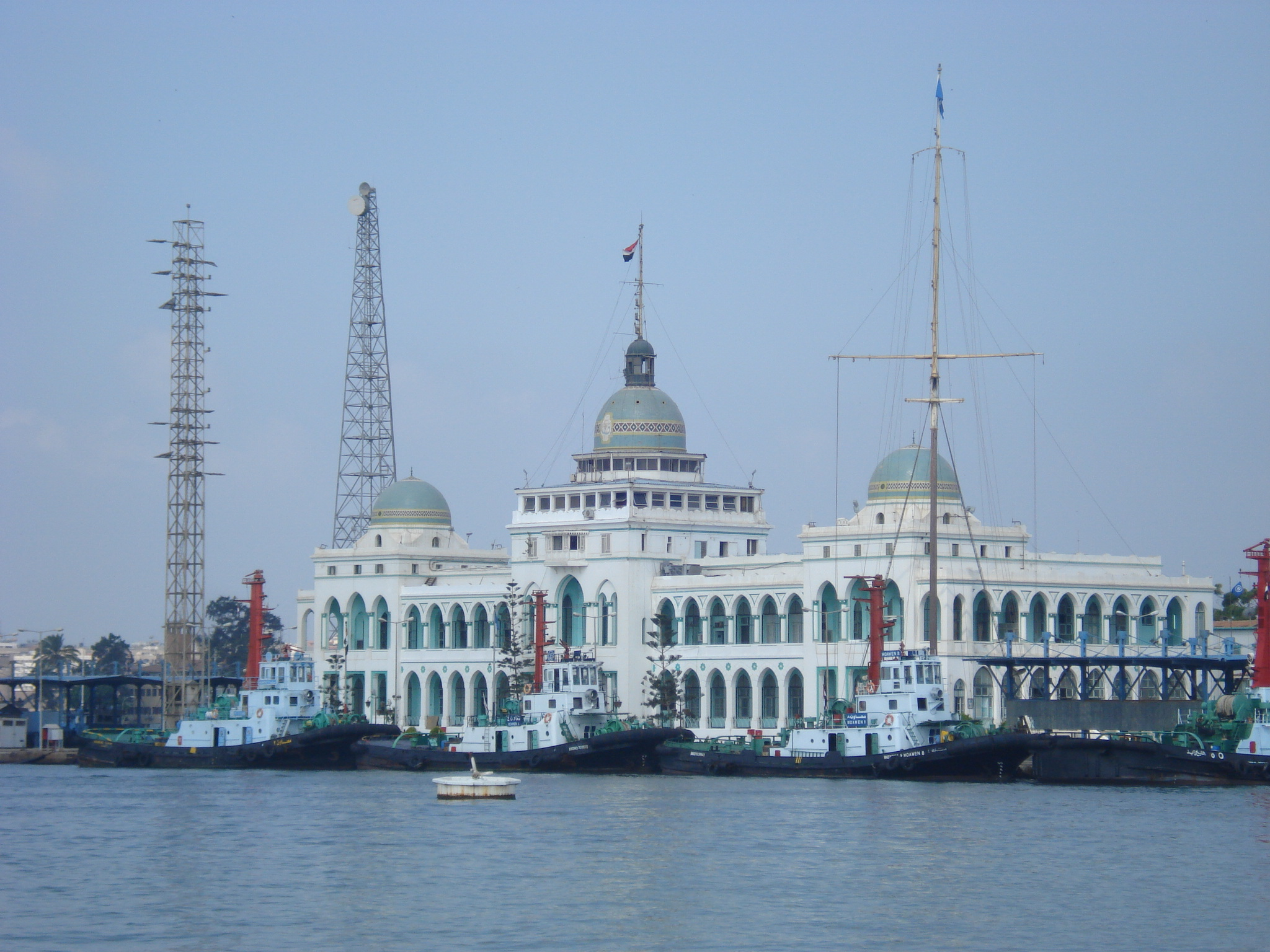
Administration building in Port Said

SCA is responsible for the computerized traffic management supported by radar, for the 14 pilot stations and their pilots. Since 1996, SCA operates the Maritime Training and Simulation Center for its pilots. SCA operates some 60 ships and boats, such as tugs, dredgers, cranes, and smaller boats.

Its facilities include 114 ferry connections with 36 ferry boats; the Ahmed Hamdi road tunnel; the Nile Shipyard; the roads alongside the canal; a silk production in a farm at Serabium using treated sanitary waste water for irrigation; water plants in the canal cities; 12,000 housing units; a hospital in Ismailia and emergency hospitals at both ends of the canal; and four schools and various sports and recreational centers.

== Revenues ==
In 2020, 5.61 billion USD revenue was collected, with 18,829 ships and a total net tonnage of 1.17 billion passing through the canal. Daily revenues are $15 million USD or €13 million.

In January 2022, SCA announced revenues of 6.3 billion USD for 2021 - the highest in the canal's history. This was an increase of 12.8% over 2020. 20,649 vessels transited the Suez Canal in 2021 – an increase of 10% over 2020.

In 2022, annual revenue stood at $8 billion in transit fees.

The Suez Canal set a new record with annual revenue of $9.4 billion in USD for the fiscal year that ended on 30 June 2023.

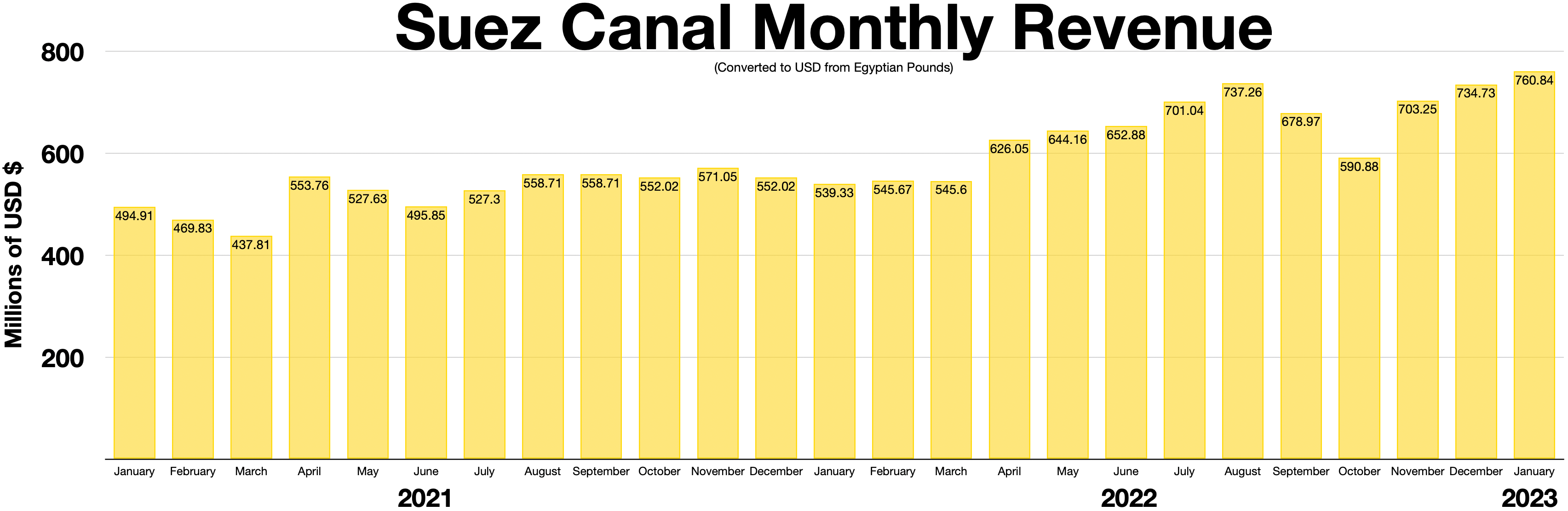
Suez Canal monthly revenue, 2021 to 2023 In USD

== Chairmen ==
- Helmy Bahgat Badawi (26 July 1956 – 4 March 1957)
- Mahmoud Younis (10 July 1957 – 10 October 1965)
- Mashhour Ahmed Mashhour (14 October 1965 – 31 December 1983)
- Mohamed Ezzat Adel (1 January 1984 – December 1995)
- Ahmed Ali Fadel (22 January 1996 – August 2012)
- Mohab Mamish (August 2012 – August 2019)
- Osama Rabie (August 2019 – present)

== See also ==
- Panama Canal Authority
- Persian Gulf Strait Authority
