= Helmy Bahgat Badawi =

Egyptian arbitrator

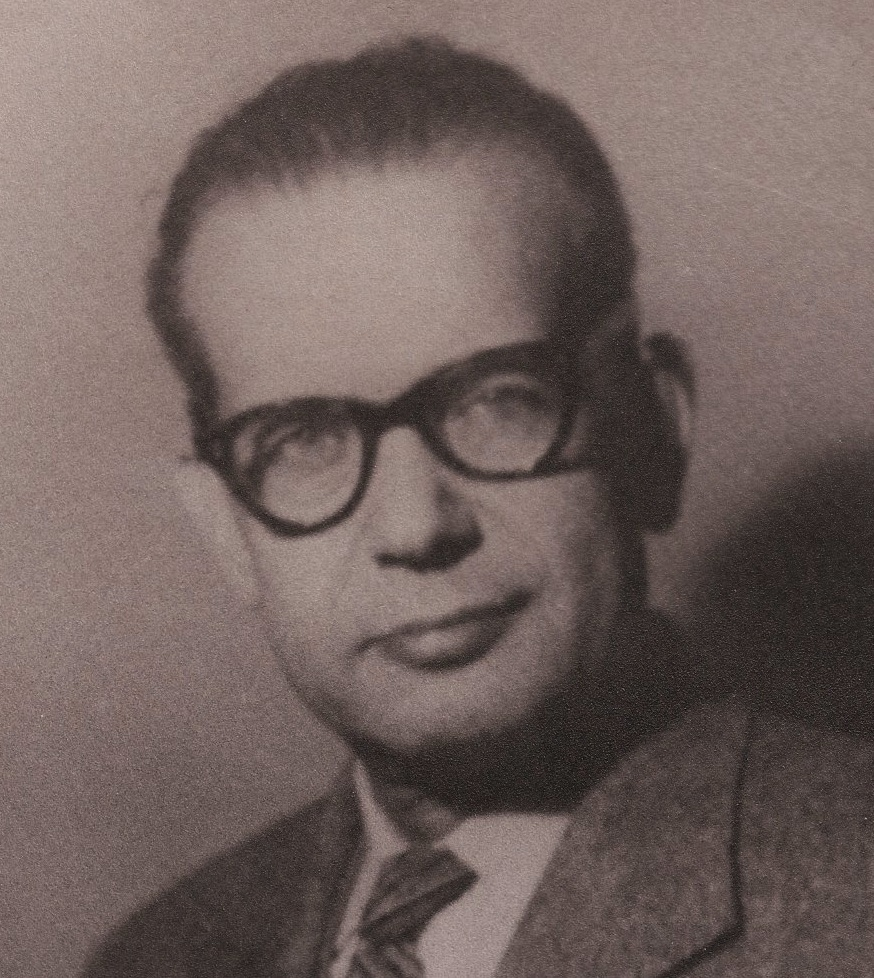
- Dr. Helmy Bahgat Badawi
- Born: November 13, 1904; Alexandria, Egypt
- Died: March 4, 1957 (aged 52); Cairo, Egypt
- Occupation: Chairman of the Suez Canal Authority of Egypt,

Helmy Bahgat Badawi (13 November 1904 - 4 March 1957) was an international arbitrator and a civil law authority who also served as the Minister of Commerce and Industry in Egypt and later as the chairman of the Suez Canal Authority, both in the 1950s.

== Academic career ==
In 1925, Helmy Bahgat Badawi obtained his Law License degree from the Egyptian University in Cairo, Egypt, and in the following year he joined the Paris-Sorbonne University where he commenced his research work in the field of Commercial law. His doctorate thesis titled La responsabilité du commettant (The responsibility of the Principal (in a manufacture/independent representative relationship)) earned him his Doctorate degree in 1929 from the same university. Upon his return to Egypt, he was appointed Professor of Civil Law at Cairo University, Egypt, where he served for several years.

== Post-academic career ==
In the mid-1930s Dr. Badawi was appointed Judge in the Egyptian Court on Issues of Government leading to a subsequent term as Judge at the Egyptian Mixed Tribunals Court. In the early part of the 1940s Dr. Badawi became involved in the banking arena where he held managerial positions at the Credit Foncier Franco-Egyptien. From the mid-1940s until the time he was appointed Chief of the Suez Canal Authority, Dr. Badawi held several key Egyptian government positions, including: Chief Counselor and Negotiator at numerous International conferences in San Francisco, New York, Paris and Geneva, Minister of Commerce and Industry in the Mohamed Naguib Government from 1952 to 1954, and head of the Egyptian delegation to the UN general assembly in 1953 and 1956. In 1955 he also served as an international arbitrator on the tanker dispute between Saudi Arabia and the Arabian American Oil Company (Aramco).

== Suez Canal Authority career ==
Dr. Badawi was the chief architect of Egypt's nationalization of the Suez Canal Company. From 1954 until the nationalization of the old Suez Canal Company, he served as a member of the Board of Directors of that company. On 26 July 1956, following the nationalization of the old Suez Canal Company, Dr. Badawi was appointed by Gamal Abdel Nasser as the first Chairman of the newly formed Suez Canal Authority where he served until his death on 4 March 1957.
