= Abdul Ghani =

Abdul Ghani (Arabic: عبد الغني), Abdel Ghani, Abdul Gani, Abdelgani, Abdelghani, Abdulgani, Abdulghani, or Abd Ghani is a masculine given name and surname of Arabic origin. It is built from the Arabic words Abd, al- and Ghani. The name means "servant of the All-sufficient", Al-Ghaniyy being one of the names of God in the Qur'an, which give rise to the Muslim theophoric names. The letter a of the al- is unstressed, and can be transliterated by almost any vowel, often by u. The last element may appear as Gani, Ghany or in other ways, with the whole name subject to variable spacing and hyphenation. There is also the West African variant Abdul Ganiyu. Notable people with the name include:

== Given name ==
=== Abdel Ghani ===
- Abdel Ghani al-Kikli (1967–2025), Libyan commander
- Abdel Ghani Loukil (born 1973), Algerian handball player

=== Abdul Gani ===
- Abdul Gani (Cox's Bazar politician) (1926–2018), Bangladeshi politician
- Abdul Gani (Meherpur politician), Bangladeshi politician
- Abdul Gani (officer) (1915–1957), Bengali military officer
- Abdul Gani Bhat (1935–2025), Indian poet and political activist
- Abdul Ganie Mohamed (born 1937), South African politician
- Abdul Gani Patail (born 1955), Malaysian lawyer
- Abdul Gani Vakil (born 1952), Indian politician

=== Abdul Ghani ===
- Abdul Ghani (Indian politician) (born 1950), Indian politician
- Abdul Ghani (JUI-F politician) (died 2011), Pakistani religious and political leader
- Abdul Ghani (Khyber Pakhtunkhwa politician), Pakistani politician
- Abdul Ghani Ahmad (born 1970), Malaysian politician
- Abdul-Ghani al-Asadi (born 1951), Iraqi military officer
- Abdul Ghani Azhari (1922–2023), Indian Islamic scholar
- Abdul Ghani Abdul Aziz (born 1944), Malaysian military officer
- Abdul Ghani Baradar (born 1963), co-founder and political leader of the Afghan Taliban
- Abdul Ghani Butt (born 1939), Pakistani weightlifter
- Abdul Ghani Dar (1907–1989), Indian politician and author
- Abdul Ghani Faiq, Afghan Taliban politician
- Abdul Ghani Ghani, Afghan politician
- Abdul Ghani Gilong (1932–2021), Malaysian politician
- Abdul Ghani Hamid (1933–2014), Singaporean writer, poet, and artist
- Abdul Ghani Hazari (1921–1976), Bangladeshi poet and journalist
- Abdul Ghani bin Ishak, Malaysian politician
- Abdul-Ghani Al-Karmi (1906–1974), Palestinian politician
- Abdul Ghani Kasuba (1951–2025), Indonesian politician
- Abdul Ghani Khan (1914–1996), Pakistani philosopher, poet, and politician
- Abdul Ghani Kohli (born 1943), Indian politician
- Abdul Ghani Lone (1932–2002), Indian lawyer and politician
- Abdul Ghani Malik (footballer) (born 1972), Malaysian footballer
- Abdul Ghani Malik (politician), Indian politician
- Abdul Ghani Minhat (1935–2012), Malaysian footballer
- Abdul Ghani Othman (born 1946), politician in Johor, Malaysia
- Abdul Ghani Rahman (born 1985), Malaysian footballer
- Abdul Ghani Samsudin (born 1946), Malaysian politician
- Abdul Ghani Saheb Saudagar (1843–1897), Nawab of Kholapur, Maharashtra, India
- Abdul-Ghani Shahad (born 1968), Iraqi footballer
- Abdul Ghani Talpur, Pakistani politician
- Abdul Ghani Mohamed Yassin (born 1960), Malaysian politician

=== Abdelgani ===
- Abdelgani Abdel Fattah (1920–??), Egyptian long-distance runner

=== Abdelghani ===
- Abdelghani Akbi (born 1933), Algerian politician
- Abdelghani Bousta (1949–1998), Moroccan politician
- Abdelghani Demmou (born 1989), Algerian football player
- Abdelghani Gtaib, Moroccan paralympic athlete
- Abdelghani Hamel (born 1955), Algerian politician and military figure
- Abdelghani Ibrahim (1878–1962), Egyptian poet
- Abdelghani El Mansouri (1942–2026), Moroccan footballer
- Abdelghani Mouaoui (born 1989), Moroccan footballer
- Abdelghani Mzoudi (born 1972), Moroccan accused in Germany of terrorism
- Abdelghani Zitouni (1932–2010), Algerian footballer

=== Abdulgani ===
- Abdulgani Dahiwala (1908–1987), Indian poet
- Abdulgani Salapuddin (born 1952), Filipino politician

=== Abdulghani ===
- Abdulghani Halalu (1947–2017), Pakistani politician
- Abdulghani Muneer (born 1992), Qatari footballer

== Surname ==
=== Abd Ghani ===
- Abdulrahman Abd Ghani, Somali politician

=== Abdel Ghani ===
- Ahmed Abdel-Ghani (born 1981), Egyptian footballer
- Alaa Abdel-Ghany (born 1979), Egyptian footballer
- Magdi Abdelghani (born 1959), Egyptian footballer

=== Abdul Ghani ===
- Abdul Aziz Abdul Ghani (1939–2011), Yemeni politician
- Amran Abdul Ghani (born 1973), Malaysian politician
- Khwaja Abdul Ghani (1813–1896), Nawab of Dhaka
- Safwan Abdul-Ghani (born 1983), Iraqi footballer

=== Abdelghani ===
- Mohamed Ben Ahmed Abdelghani (1927–1996), Algerian politician

=== Abdulghani ===
- Mohamed Abdulghani, Ethiopian economist and politician

== Nicknames ==
- Abdul Ghani Afghan, former Guantanamo detainee (ISN 934). See List of Afghan detainees at Guantanamo Bay /Abdul Ghani
- Abdul Ghani (Guantanamo detainee 943), Afghan, former Guantanamo detainee (ISN 943). See List of Afghan detainees at Guantanamo Bay /Abdul Ghani

== See also ==
- Abdul Ganiyu
