= 1923–24 Egyptian parliamentary election =

- 27 September 1923 (first stage); 12 January 1924 (second stage)
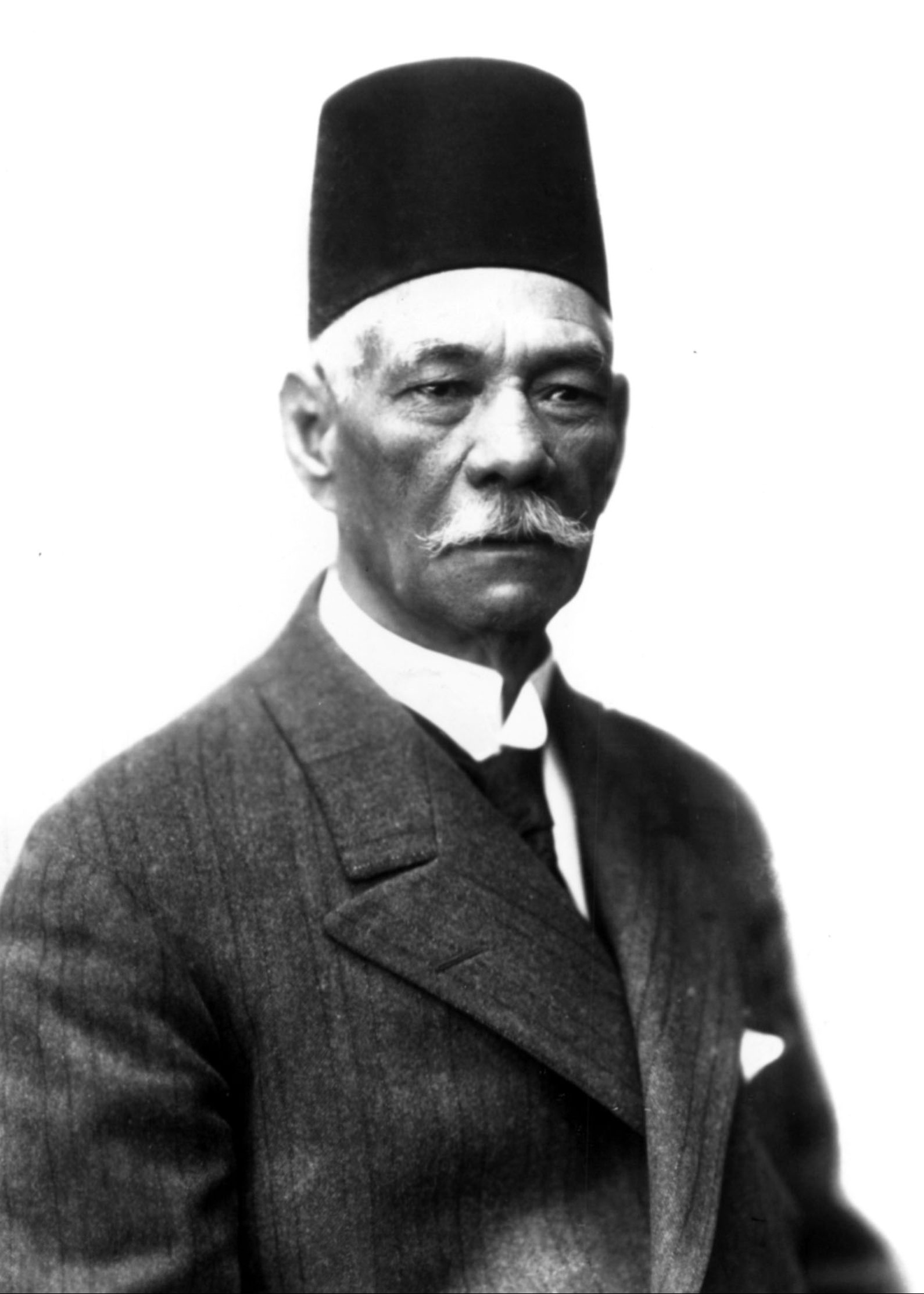

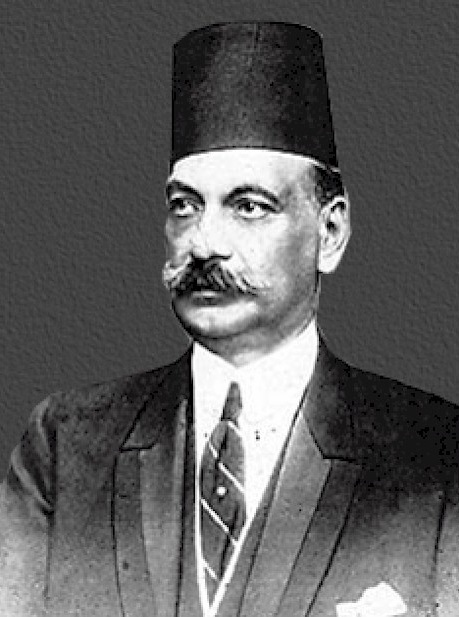

	First party	Second party	Third party
Leader	Saad Zaghloul	Adly Yakan Pasha	Muhammad Hafiz Ramadan Pasha
Party	Wafd	Liberal Constitutional	National
Seats won	179	20	7
Percentage	49.41%	24.72%	7.56%
Prime Minister before election
Yahya Ibrahim Pasha
Independent
Subsequent Prime Minister
Saad Zaghloul
Wafd Party

Parliamentary elections were held in two stages in Egypt in 1923 and 1924, the first since nominal independence from the United Kingdom in 1922. The result was a victory for the Wafd Party, which won 179 of the 211 seats.

== Background ==
The British government unilaterally recognised Egypt's independence on 28 February 1922. The Kingdom of Egypt was established two weeks later. On 21 April 1923 a new liberal constitution was promulgated. A royal decree was published on 6 September, which ordered the holding of the first elections under the new constitution. Nationalist leader Saad Zaghloul, who had been exiled to Aden, Seychelles and Gibraltar, returned to Egypt on 1 September to take part in the campaign. Zaghloul and his partisans ran a campaign that exposed the problems of the newly established constitutional order. He was especially critical of the electoral laws, which he viewed as incompatible with democracy since they made eligibility of candidacy conditional on income. The Students Executive Committee of Zaghloul's Wafd Party played a crucial role in the campaign.

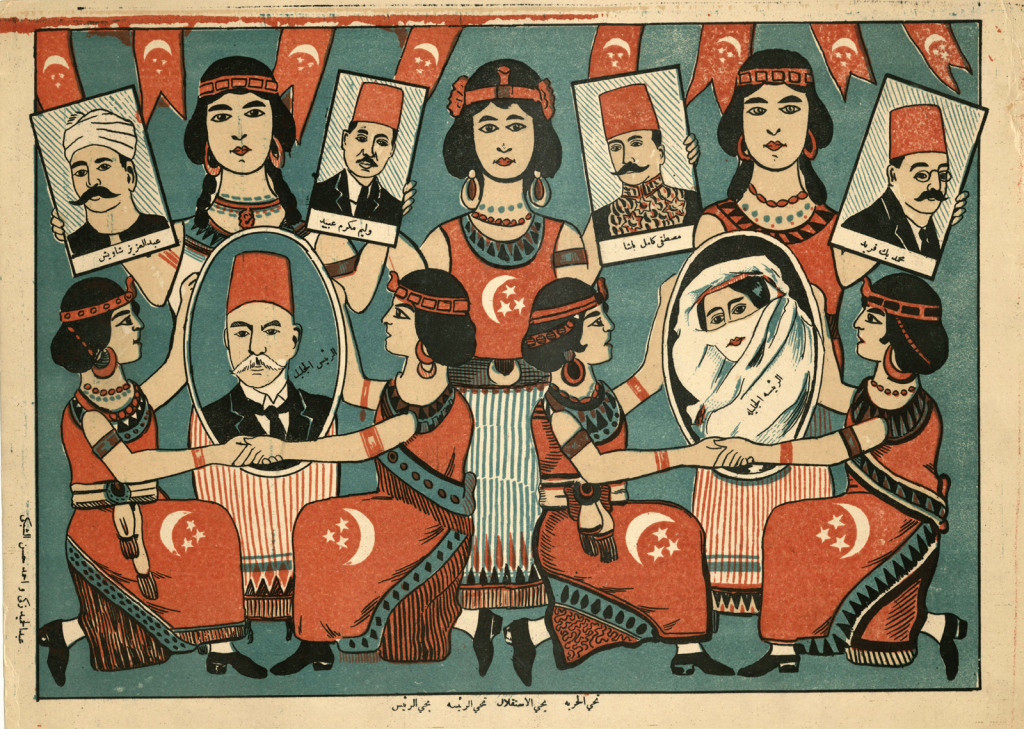
Political cartoon in Cairo Punch supporting Sa'ad Zaghloul and Safiya Zaghloul during the 1923 elections. In the background from left to right are the Egyptian politicians ʻAbd al-ʻAzīz Jāwīsh, Makram Ebied, Mustafa Kamil and Muhammad Farid.

== Electoral system ==
The election was held over two stages. In the first stage on 27 September 1923, 38,000 delegates were elected by the general population, where each delegate represented 30 votes. These were announced on 3 October. In the second stage on 12 January 1924 the delegates elected members of the new parliament. For the Senate, two-fifths of the seats were appointed by the King, while the remainder were elected.

== Results ==
Zaghloul's Wafd Party, which had run for all Chamber of Deputies seats, won a landslide victory, winning 179 of the 211 seats. However, it fared less well in the Senate because it was harder to find qualified candidates to run for its constituencies. It won 66 Senate seats. Wafdist voters included the medium and small landowners, urban professionals, merchants and industrialists, shopkeepers, workers and peasants.

Members of Egypt's Coptic Christian minority received 10% of the seats. This was higher than the Copts' share of Egypt's population, which stood at six percent according to the 1917 census. The social origin of the Copts who had been elected was very similar to that of the Muslims: mostly wealthy landowners, but also a small number of middle-class professionals, mostly lawyers as well as a few doctors. Two-thirds of the districts that elected Copts were in Upper Egypt, and one-third in Lower Egypt. The Wafd was the only party that managed to get Coptic candidates elected in the Nile Delta region of Lower Egypt, where Copts were not very numerous. It felt vindicated by these results, which were a clear sign of the party's strength and a testament to its commitment to secularism and national unity.

Party	Votes	%	Seats
Wafd Party	33,354	49.41	179
Liberal Constitutional Party	16,690	24.72	20
National Party	5,103	7.56	7
Independents	12,357	18.31	5
Total	67,504	100.00	211
Total votes	67,504	–	
Registered voters/turnout	69,689	96.86	
Source: Khatib, pp. 486–487

== Aftermath ==
The Wafd Party's resounding victory meant that King Fuad I had no choice but to ask Zaghloul to form a new government. He did so on 27 January, and Zaghloul was named Prime Minister of Egypt. The Wafd felt it had a mandate to conclude a treaty with the United Kingdom that would assure Egypt complete independence. As prime minister, Zaghloul carefully selected a cross-section of Egyptian society for his cabinet, which he called the "People's Ministry". On 15 March 1924 King Fuad opened the first constitutional parliament amid national rejoicing. The Wafdist government did not last long, however.

On 19 November 1924 Lee Stack, the British governor general of Sudan and commander of the Egyptian Army, was assassinated in Cairo. The assassination was one of a series of killings of British officials that had begun in 1920. Viscount Allenby, the British High Commissioner to Egypt, considered Stack an old and trusted friend. He was thus determined to avenge the crime and in the process humiliate the Wafd and destroy its credibility in Egypt. Allenby demanded that Egypt apologize, prosecute the assailants, pay a £500,000 indemnity, withdraw all troops from Sudan, consent to an unlimited increase of irrigation in Sudan and end all opposition to the capitulations (Britain's demand of the right to protect foreign interests in the country). Zaghloul wanted to resign rather than accept the ultimatum, but Allenby presented it to him before Zaghloul could offer his resignation to the king. Zaghloul and his cabinet decided to accept the first four terms but to reject the last two. On 24 November, after ordering the Ministry of Finance to pay the indemnity, Zaghloul resigned. Parliament was dissolved on 24 December 1924. He died three years later.

== See also ==
- Egypt's Liberal Experiment
