= Muhammad Loutfi Goumah =

Egyptian author and barrister

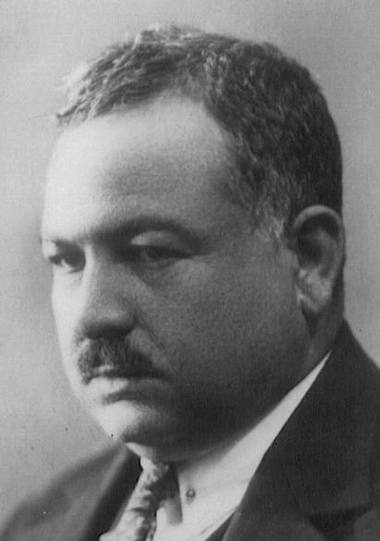
- Muhammad Loutfi Goumah
- Born: 18 January 1886; Alexandria, Khedivate of Egypt
- Died: 15 June 1953 (aged 67); Egypt
- Occupations: Author, essayist, barrister
- Known for: Literary criticism, political activist, Islamic Philosophy
- Spouse: Nafeesa Muhammad Fahmy Al-Ebrashy
- Children: 10 children

Muhammad Loutfi Goumah (Arabic: محمد لطفي جمعة muħammæd lūtfi ǧomʿa; also spelled Mohammed Lotfy Gomaa or Muhammed Lotfy Jouma') (January 18, 1886 Alexandria − June 15, 1953 Cairo), was an Egyptian essayist, author, and barrister. He studied law and became one of Egypt's most famous lawyers and public speakers. He was a member of the prestigious Arab Academy of Damascus, he spoke Arabic, English, French and Italian, he also had a profound knowledge of Hieroglyphic and Latin.

== Early life and education ==
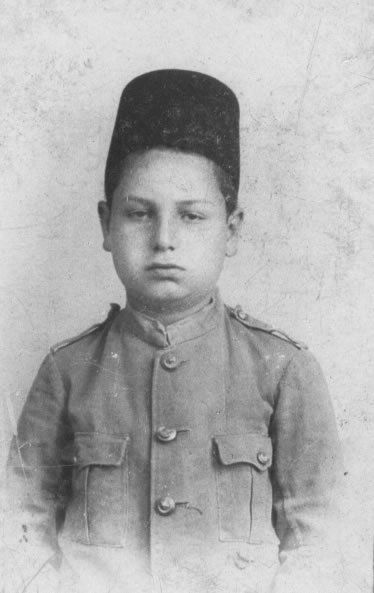
Loutfi Goumah age 9

Goumah was born in Alexandria, the second biggest city in Egypt, then under the British occupation. His father was the honorable sayed Goumah Aboul-Kheir, a descendant of Muhammad, his mother Khadeeja Mahmoud Al-Sonbaty, an Egyptian lady of Egyptian, Turkish and French ancestry. His mother couldn't breast-feed, and he was breastfed by Molouk Eid, the mother of the famous Arab music composer Sayed Darwish. His family moved to the city of Tanta, where he joined the Coptic school. He completed his secondary education at the Prince's School in 1903; his mother died the same year. After this, he traveled to Beirut and joined the American College in Beirut to study philosophy. He returned to Egypt and worked as a school teacher at the Helwan primary school, until late 1907, when he acquired his baccalaureate. He joined the Khedival Law School in 1908 to earn a degree in law, but was expelled after a speech he made on the 40-day death memorial of Egyptian nationalist Mustafa Kamil. He moved to France and joined the law school at Lyon University, studying law under the famous French scholar Eduoard Lambert. After acquiring his doctorate in late 1912, Goumah returned to Egypt and started his career as a lawyer.

== Teaching ==
Loutfi Goumah taught through two periods of his life. The first period was at the Helwan primary school (late 1904–late 1907); among his students were Abdulrahman Azzam and Abdulrahman Al-Sawy, dean of the Faculty of Engineering at Cairo University. The second period was in 1917, when he taught criminal law at Cairo University.

== Influence ==
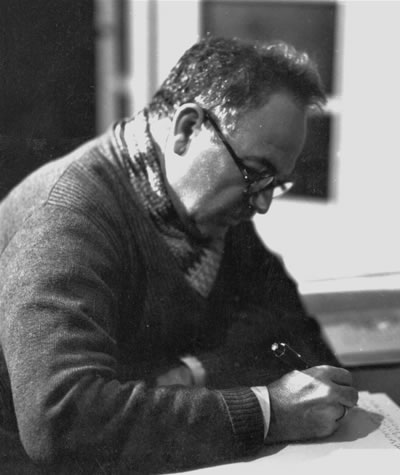
Loutfi Goumah

Goumah began to write articles against the British occupation of Egypt in early 1905 through the newspaper al-Zaher. However, he was removed from writing after writing a speech during the celebration of the coronation of the khedive Abbas II of Egypt, in which he explained the détente policy between England and France and blamed the khedive for supporting the British occupation. He went off to join Mustafa Kamil Pasha as an editor for Al Liwa, along with Charles Rudy and William Maloney.

After joining Al Liwa, Goumah wrote in various periodicals and newspapers, accumulating thousands of articles. He wrote extensively in al-Ahram, al-Balagh, al-Zaher, al-Balagh weekly, al-Bayan, al-Moqtabas. His articles covered many aspects of the Egyptian life during that era, ranging from economics, international politics and political philosophy to literature, literary criticism and Sufism.

Goumah raised in his articles subjects that were addressed in Egypt and other Arab countries decades after his death. He called for free education at Al-Balagh in May 1930, nearly two decades before Taha Hussein, the Egyptian minister of education, began to implement it. In 1933, through his novel Aida (published through Al-Balagh), he criticized Egyptian personal status laws for giving only men the right for divorce, the same law Goumah refused to adopt when getting married by offering his wife equal rights regarding divorce. It was only in 2001 when Egyptian personal status law accommodated khul', a method by which women may divorce in compliance with Islamic sharia. He criticized polygamy in "al-Rabetah al-Arabeyya" in 1938, calling for strict regulations to control it.

In Goumah's opinion, his interpretation of Islamic scripture did not contradict with his views regarding his firm support to the feminist ideologies, nor did it contradict with his dedicated interest in metaphysics, sufism and spiritualism, subjects that are still looked upon with skepticism among orthodox Muslim scholars. According to Anwar al-Gendy, Goumah represents the soul of the moderate school with a clear affiliation and belief in the orient, Islam and Egypt.

== Political activity ==
=== Nationalism ===
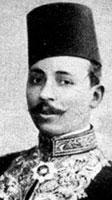
Mustafa Kamil

In 1906 and during a vacation in Lausanne, Switzerland, Goumah was introduced to Mustafa Kamil and Mohammad Farid the founders of the Egyptian National Party and famous Egyptian patriots. Kamil and Farid were touring Europe head hunting for editors for the "Egyptian Standard", their new newspaper. Goumah was intrigued by the charisma of Mustafa Kamil and joined the Egyptian National party having believed in Mustafa kamil's cause.

=== Congress of the Jeunesse Egyptienne, Geneva, 1909 ===
During his university years in France, Goumah continued his political activities by forming student groups, writing speeches and corresponding with different political figures in Europe, who were known for their support and sympathy for the Egyptian cause against the British occupation. He participated in three conferences held in Geneva, Brussels and Paris in 1909, 1910, 1911 respectively.

=== Wilfrid Scawen Blunt ===
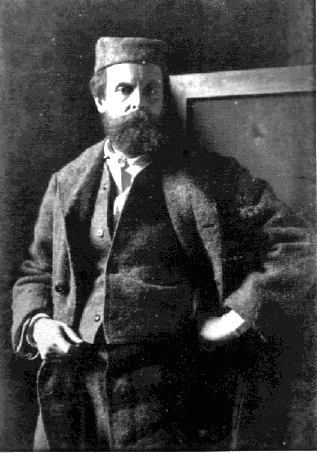
Wilfrid Scawen Blunt

One of the figures Goumah corresponded with during his residence in Europe was the English Poet Wilfrid Scawen Blunt, who was known for his support to the Egyptian cause and for his support to Ahmed Orabi the Egyptian Nationalist who revolted against the Khedive Tewfik. Blunt was also a friend of famous Egyptian Grand Mufti Muhammad Abduh of which Goumah was a disciple. Abduh used to say that Blunt is "just a noble Englishman who is loyal to Egypt, the Arabs, Islam and Humanity". Goumah travelled to Britain to consult with Blunt on political issues in August 1909 and spent the night at his estate "Newbuildings". He also received a copy of a speech to be read on Blunt's behalf for the Congress in Geneva. Goumah kept the relationship with Blunt until Blunt's death in 1922. The West Sussex Record Office has records for 203 letters between Goumah and Blunt.

=== Addressing Keir Hardie ===
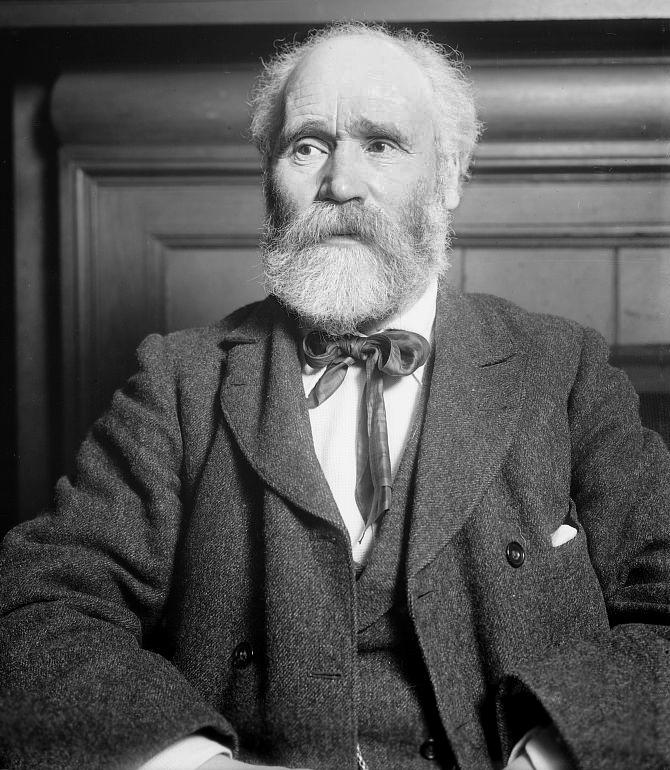
Keir Hardie

Today is a great day! Keir Hardie made his long awaited speech in a huge crowd, he blamed Egypt and praised Cromer and the occupation forces, he mentioned the agricultural and irrigation projects done by the British occupation in Egypt. We were extremely disappointed, members of the parliament were shocked and everybody clapped and cheered. I immediately asked to speak but Mohammad Fahmy refused, So I asked him to allow me to thank Hardie, and as I stood there among the people who were stunned by Kier Hardie's speech, I responded to his allegations word for word.

— Muhammad Loutfi Goumah, The memoirs of Muhammad Loutfi Goumah, Part 1, Page 198

It was only Goumah's courageous speech that turned the table against these.

— Wilfred Scawen Blunt, My Diaries; Being A Personal Narrative Of Events, 1888-1914 Volume II P.279

=== Tom Kettle ===
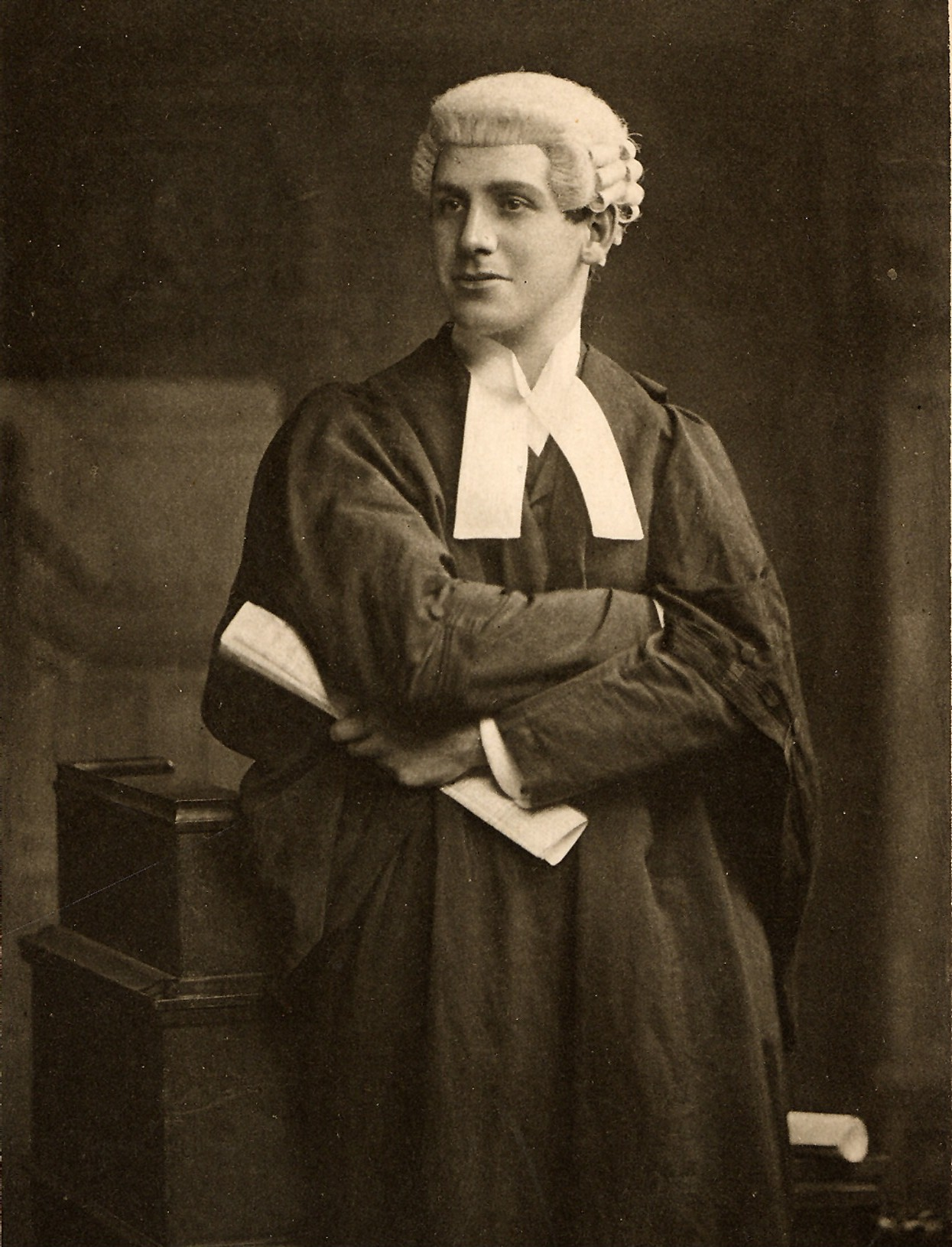
Tom Kettle

Tom Kettle the Irish journalist, barrister and MP in the House of Commons of the United Kingdom of Great Britain and Ireland, Recorded in his book The Day's Burden, Studies, Literary and Political -1910, p. 112 this incident:

Just as every picture has its centre of repose, so every assembly has its centre of tension. At Geneva this central point was found when M. Loutfi Goumah leaped to his feet to reply to some things that Mr. Keir Hardie had said, and to other things which he had not said. " Mr, Hardie has spoken of helping us to achieve ' some effective form of self-government.' We do not want ' some effective form of self-government,' Egypt demands a free constitution, flowing to her not from the British Parliament but from her own monarch, the Khedive. Mr. Hardie promises to ask questions in the House of Commons. What sort of questions ? He will ask whether Cairo has a good drainage system, and whether the water is drinkable in Alexandria. But we want fundamental questions about fundamental matters. We want him to ask what is to be the date of the evacuation". My duty is not to appraise, but merely to chronicle facts, and without discussing the strange interpretation which exhibited Mr. Hardie as a Conservative, I have only to say that as M. Goumah proceeded with his speech, the tides of passion rose higher and higher in the Congress, and that he resumed his chair amid a tumult of cheers. Crimson tarbouches bobbed their way to the platform, and groups of students flung themselves on the orator, embracing him, and kissing his hands. " The Mazzini of Egypt ! " shouted somebody beside me in the crowd".

— Thomas Kettle, The Day's Burden, Studies, Literary and Political -1910, p. 112,113,114

=== The Egyptian National Conference, Brussels, 1910 ===
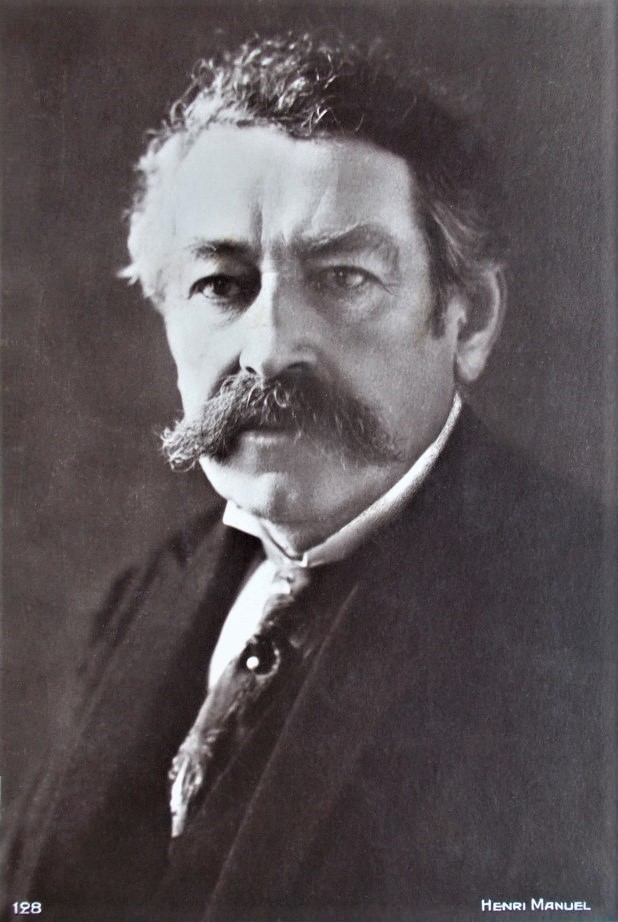
Aristide Briand

In 1910, Aristide Briand, then the Prime Minister and Minister of Interior of France, summoned Goumah, Mohammad Farid and Hamed El-Alayli (an Egyptian Nationalist studying at Oxford) to his office and informed them that the French Authorities were reluctant to host the Egyptian National Conference on French soil; he suggested Switzerland or Luxembourg as valid alternatives. Both Goumah and Farid expressed their disappointment; they also complained about being followed by British secret service agents in France, a complaint that was denied by Briand, claiming that "they imagine seeing the Brits everywhere".

The Egyptian National Conference was held in Brussels on 22 September 1910 and a book was issued recording its event:
"Œuvres du congrès national égyptien tenu a Bruxelles le 22, 23 et 24 septembre, Bruges, 1911".

=== Indians in Exile ===
During his years in France, Goumah got in contact with many Indian patriots in exile, some were members of the India House, others were from the Paris Indian Society. Among them were Vinayak Damodar Savarkar, Virendranath Chattopadhyaya, Har Dayal, Shyamji Krishnavarma and Bhikaiji Cama, who were known for sympathizing with the Egyptian cause. Goumah tried to resolve the conflict between Madam Cama and Krishnavarma

=== Meeting Gandhi ===
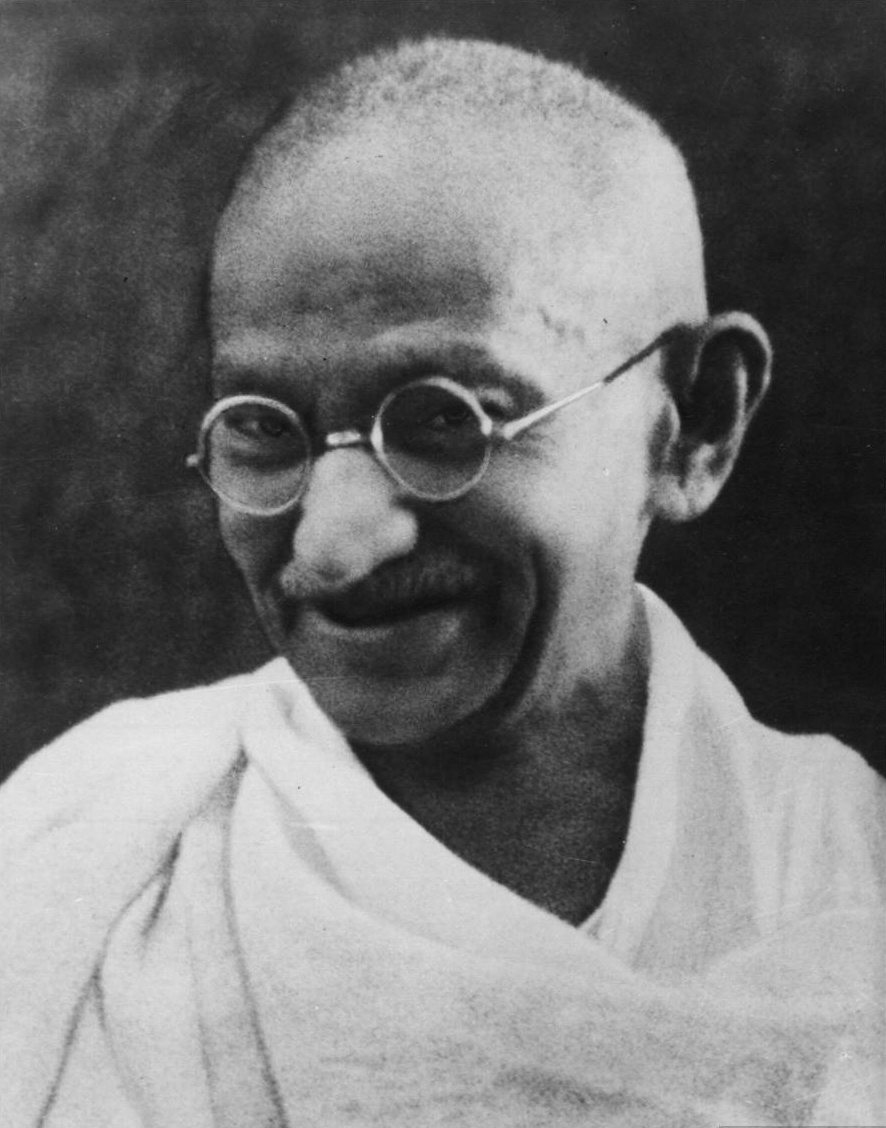
Gandhi

On 7 September 1931 Goumah boarded the SS Rajputana in Port Said to meet with Mahatma Gandhi, the meeting lasted for eight hours.

You(Egypt) resemble India in your struggle against the principles of the British Empire, but the feet of the English in our country is firmer, deeper and their page is darker, so you should be guided by us in Egypt as we are enlightened by you in India, our leaders often stressed at the ideals of the union between Muslims and Copts in Egypt and called our nation of Hindus and Muslims to such a union.

— Muhammad Loutfi Goumah, The memoirs of Muhammad Loutfi Goumah, Part 1, Page 554

== Legal career ==
=== The Amin Ossman Case ===
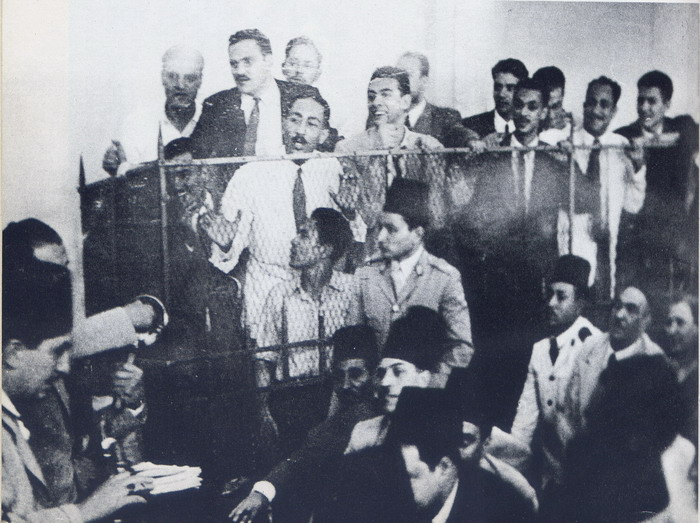
The "Amin Ossman" Trial

In 1912, having returned from France, Goumah passed the Bar Examination that was focused entirely on his knowledge of Islamic Shari'a and Islamic Inheritance jurisprudence and in 1915 he was appointed as a lawyer in front of the Egyptian appeals court. Goumah has been appointed as the defence lawyer for some of the most famous cases known to the Egyptian society at the time, including: the Lee Stack murder case, the bombs case and the Amin Ossman murder case, in which he represented Ahmed Wassim Khaled and Muhammed Anwar al-Sadat.

Goumah mentioned in his memoirs the trial of Anwar al-Sadat - then an army officer - and others, in the murder case of Egypt's minister of finance Amin Ossman, the defendants which Goumah referred to as the "boys" refused to get into a cage that was designed not to allow any physical contact with them:

I headed towards the chief of security - a colonel – and told him: "I warn you colonel from using force to make – those young men – get inside the cage". He said: "I was ordered to do so, but I won't. Yet, the chief justice refuses to get into the court room, until they are inside the cage". So the "boys" asked me to talk to the chief justice and explain their point of view, an' I accepted. The colonel then stopped me and said:" do you have a copy of The Nights of the Confused Soul ليالي الروح الحائر, I have read it when I was in high school, and didn't forget it. I am fifty five years old now". I smiled and told him:" but it didn't prevent you from serving the police?". He replied: "earning a living sir .... I am a rebel but I'm obedient!"

— Muhammad Loutfi Goumah, The memoirs of Muhammad Loutfi Goumah, Part 1, Page 372

== Islamic philosophy and Sufism ==
During his high school years at the khedive's school, Goumah studied Arabic literature, metaphysics and Philosophy under sheikh Tantawy Gohary the famous Islamic scholar and Egypt's Nobel prize nominee, and the author of "The Jewels in Interpreting the Holy Quraan", Gohary introduced him to Islamic Philosophy and Spiritualism. he then corresponded with sheikh Muhammed Abduh the Grand Mufti of Egypt and eventually became one of his disciples. Two of Goumah's letters to the grand mufti at the age of 18, were published in Rashid Rida's book on Muhammad Adbuh, with Rashid commenting on one of them:

...his search - at this young age - was at the highest levels of philosophy with respect to religion.

— The history of Imam Muhammad Abduh - P. 791-796, Muhammad Rashid Rida

Both Gohary and Abduh were icons of enlightenment, and they both became pillars of Goumah's intellectual structure. He wrote many articles and books discussing, debating, defining and recording the lives of famous Islamic philosophers and Sufis'. His book "History of Islamic Philosophers in the East and West" is considered one of the finest references written on the subject to date.

=== al-Shehab Arr'aassed ===
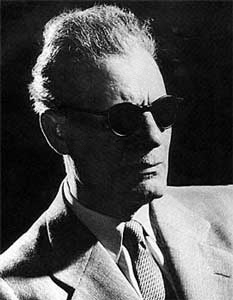
Taha Hussein

In June 1926, A group of Al-Azhar scholars visited Goumah in his office asking him to sue Taha Hussein for writing his controversial book Pre-Islamic poetry, Goumah - who has not read the book - ordered a copy, and after reading what Taha Hussein has written and the philosophical argument he adopted in his book, Goumah refused to sue Hussein, but rather decided to write a book that defies Hussien's philosophical approach. The book whose name was derived for a quranic verse in surat Al-Jinn that may literally mean "The monitoring Comet Arabic الشهاب الراصد Pronounced Alshehab Arr'aassed" became Goumah's most famous work.

(وَأَنَّا كُنَّا نَقْعُدُ مِنْهَا مَقَاعِدَ لِلسَّمْعِ فَمَنْ يَسْتَمِعْ الآنَ يَجِدْ لَهُ شِهَأباً رَصَداً (9
'We used, indeed, to sit there in (hidden) stations, to (steal) a hearing; but any who listen now will find a flaming fire(monitoring comet) watching him in ambush.(9)

— سورة الجن - surat Al-Jinn, The Quran

In "Pre-Islamic poetry" Hussien claimed using Descartes Methodic doubt process to analyse pre-Islamic scripture: Poetry and prose, he concluded that most if not All what was claimed to be pre-Islamic is in fact written after Islam for political and tribal reasons.

Goumah based his argument on a technical philosophical approach, he debated the flows in the derivations concluded by Hussein on pure academic grounds by re-explaining the methods of Descartes, he then supported his argument with historical, linguistic and social facts. The tides against Hussein's book grew higher and higher and eventually Hussein removed the four sections of his book that were taken against him and renamed the book "Pre-Islamic Literature".

=== Louis Massignon and al-Hallaj ===
Having written a few articles in al-Rabetah al-Arabeyyah magazine in 1937 about al-Hallaj, Goumah was called on by Louis Massignon the famous French orientalist at Goumah house in Heliopolis to discuss Al-Hallaj, their meetings and correspondences continued until Goumah's death in 1953. Massignon was particularly interested in a book Goumah was writing about al-Hallaj, yet died without finishing it.

== Death ==
Goumah Died suffering from the complications of a cerebral infarction on 15 June 1953.

== His Memoires ==
Goumah started recording his diaries in 1909, it suffered periods of discontinuity that may sometimes reach several months after which, he would resume writing. He has written a long introduction that covers the period from his birth to the date he started writing the memoires):

To whom am I writing these memoires? to God and to myself. I don't think anyone knows about them or expects them to exist, they are written quickly and under severe pressure, my head is like a boiling cauldron, and my heart will almost explode, from what I see and hear in this saddening country. Those who find my memoirs, whether my children or strangers may rearrange and publish them after my death, and if God gave me a longer life, I will, because it gives a picture - even if incomplete - of the day, era and life in Egypt during this war, I am convinced that every effort in Egypt is useless, and its masters seek their own interest and abide neither to God nor to conscience.

— Muhammad Loutfi Goumah, Memoires of Muhammad Loutfi Goumah - Part 1, P.41

=== Augusta Filippovna Damansky ===
Goumah's memoirs were printed in 2000 in two books, the first was published under the title: "Muhammad Loutfi Goumah - Witness to an Era" (Part I - II), the second -released in 1999- reveals Goumah's love story with Russian author and essayist Augusta Damansky, under the title "Memoirs of Youth - the anniversary of March 19," in which complete sections of his diaries; in addition to a set of letters sent by Augusta to Loutfi Goumah were included. In his memoires, Goumah reveals the story of an emotional Platonic relationship that lasted for nearly four years with Augusta, they toured throughout Europe together and he recorded the evolution of their relationship in a chapter in his diaries called the "March 19 anniversary" (the date of their first meeting). He Dedicated his translation of The Prince by Machiavelli to her, he wrote a play called "The woman's heart" about her, and used a pseudonym (Auguste Filippov), clearly derived from her name to write some articles in the weekly magazine "The Arab Association" in 1930, and in 1939 he published some of her letters addressed to him claiming they were addressed to a poet named (Popov Ludowski), a name Augusta addressed him with in her letters.

=== Controversy about the Memoires ===
When published, the memoires raised controversy among critics, some of whom praised it for the amount of detail it included about the political, literary and cultural aspects of life in Egypt (1909–1948), others directed a scathing criticism to the views Goumah displayed therein, they criticised its subjective style and its obvious pessimism and bitterness with which Goumah referred to some literary and political figures of his time. It was also criticized for being subjected to heavy editing, prohibiting certain periods from publication (1918–1921), and its poor arrangement (adding articles and studies outside the context of the memoirs).

Also, the memoires were criticised for extracting parts of it to be published in separate books like Goumah's relationship with Augusta (Memoirs of Youth - the anniversary of March 19) or Goumah's relationship with the French orientalist Louis Massignon, which is published in a book titled: (Tunisia in the writings of Loutfi Goumah - by Rabeh Loutfi Goumah).

== His unpublished work ==
A number of scholars went through the manuscripts of Goumah's unpublished work, led by his son Rabeh, who filed, arranged, collected and printed many of them. Goumah's unpublished manuscripts were mostly in the form of notebooks or papers. Dr. Ahmad Hussein al-Tamawy, Egyptian author and writer along with Dr. Sayed Ali Ismael of al-Minya University and Dr. Ibrahim Awad of Ain Shams University, revised many of Goumah's manuscripts, adding footnotes, identifying the different historical characters mentioned in Goumah's works. They also made literary critique for some of his plays.

== His most famous literary works ==
=== Studies ===
- Renaissance in Italy - 1911
- History of Social Science - 1919
- Plato's Banquet - 1920
- The Monitoring Comet - 1926
- History of Islamic Philosophers in the East and West - 1927
- Life of the Orient: its countries, people, past and present - 1932
- Revolution of Islam and the Hero of Prophets - 1939
- Blessed days in Holy Lands - 1940
- Memoirs of Youth - the anniversary of March 19
- Modern Revision of the Holy Quraan

=== Novels and Short Stories ===
- In the Homes of People - 1904
- In the Valley of Concerns - 1904
- The Nights of the Confused Soul - 1912
- The Fair Young Man - 1930
- The Embryo - 1930
- For the sake of life and Death - 1931
- Aieda - 1932
- After Repention - 1932
- Qorrat Al-Ain - 1934
- Corlinko and Evagina - 1937
- Mukhtarah - 1941

=== Plays ===
- Niro - 1919
- The Stolen Heritage - 1932
- The Death of Al-Hallaj- 1942

=== Translations ===
- The Liberation of Egypt - 1906
- The Immortal Magician - 1906
- The Oriental Wisdom - 1912
- The Prince - 1912
- Ulysses - 1947
