= Omar Lotfy =

Egyptian lawyer and human rights activist

Omar Lotfy Bey
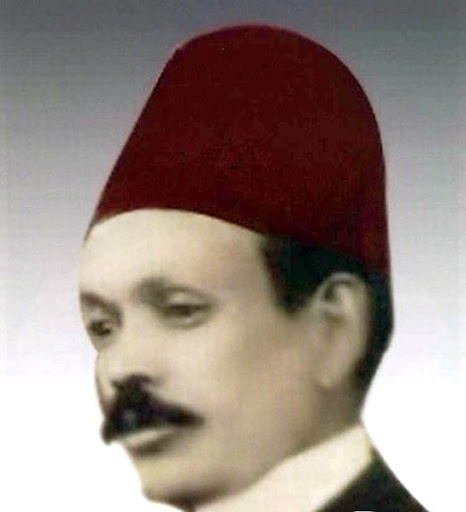
- Omar Lotfy Bek the founder of Al Ahly
- Born: 1867; Alexandria, Ottoman Egypt
- Died: 14 November 1911 (aged 44); Cairo, Egypt
- Occupations: Lawyer, human rights activist
- Known for: Pioneer of the cooperative movement in Egypt; originator of the idea of founding Al Ahly Club

Omar Lotfy Bey (full name Omar Lotfy ibn Youssef Ashour Al-Masry; died 14 November 1911) was an Egyptian lawyer and human rights activist. He is known as the "father of cooperation" in Egypt and as one of the pioneers of the cooperative movement worldwide, as well as for his support of women's rights. He is also credited with the idea of founding Al Ahly Club.

== Early life ==
Omar Lotfy Bey was born in Alexandria in 1867. His family was of Moroccan origin and had come to Egypt during the reign of Muhammad Ali Pasha; its head was a prominent figure in Morocco who represented Morocco before the Egyptian government. He was educated at the Charitable Society School founded by Sheikh Abdullah an-Nadeem, where he memorized the Quran. He then moved to Cairo, lived in Bulaq, and completed his schooling at the Frères school.

Omar Lotfy Bey enrolled in the School of Law and graduated in 1886. He rose through the ranks and achieved notable success within a short period. He first worked in the Government Cases Department, then in the law office of Saad Zaghloul, and then as a judge at the court of Qena. He preferred to continue in education, however, and became deputy head of the School of Law at the age of 38. He later left the School of Law, returned to the judiciary and opened a law office, and continued to work as a lawyer until his death.

== Work ==
In 1907, Omar Lotfy Bey saw the financial crisis deepen and the injustice farmers suffered at the hands of usurers and speculators, and he began looking for a way to save the Egyptian people from such crises in the future. After studying agricultural cooperation in Italy in 1908, he concluded that the Egyptian government should follow the example of Germany and Italy by establishing agricultural associations in every town to assist farmers in place of the usurers and speculators. The government did not accept his proposal, so he turned to establishing agricultural associations himself, whose work was lending and the cooperative marketing of Egyptian crops. He then began promoting the creation of cooperative societies, which he called the "Home Cooperation Company" (Sharikat al-Ta'awun al-Manzili). These societies were established in Cairo and then in other major Egyptian cities, such as Alexandria, Mansoura, Minya, Monufia and Helwan. He travelled across Egypt to spread his call for founding associations and cooperatives.

Omar Lotfy Bey is considered one of the pioneers of the cooperative movement worldwide, and farmers and Egyptians in general called him the "father of cooperation" in Egypt. The agricultural problem was one of the hardest economic problems in Egypt, so he began to call for economic independence. One of his closest friends was Mustafa Kamil Pasha, who helped him show the people the benefits of cooperatives, which ran counter to the ambitions of the occupation. Omar Lotfy Bey is also considered the founder of the first labor union in Egypt, the Handicrafts Workers Union.

== Research on women's rights ==
Omar Lotfy Bey is considered the first researcher to discuss "women's rights" in a treatise printed in Cairo in 1897, before the call of Qasim Amin. The treatise was a summary of a lecture he had delivered in French in September 1896. In it he set out the rights of women in Islamic law and compared them with the rights of Western women at that time, arguing that women, whom people then called "the gentle sex", found in Islamic law a protection they did not find in the laws in force at the time.

== Presidency of the Higher Schools Club ==
In October 1905, Mustafa Kamil Pasha and a group of his friends began considering the founding of a Higher Schools Club. After the necessary capital for building the club was raised, the first founding general assembly of the Higher Schools Students' Club met on Friday, 8 December 1905, in a hall of the School of Medicine to elect the club's board. The election resulted in the choice of Omar Lotfy Bey as president of the club; he was one of the closest friends of Mustafa Kamil Pasha.

On the opening day Omar Lotfy Bey gave a speech, and everyone was impressed by the club and its organization. Within three years the number of members had doubled. The students' club then became the national mind around which the leaders of the nationalist movement gathered; demonstrations against the British set out from it after every national incident, and from it emerged the idea of founding Al Ahly Club for physical sports.

== Idea of founding Al Ahly Club ==
The idea arose in the mind of the "president of the Higher Schools Club" of establishing a sports club that would bring together, through sport, the club's politically minded students and other students of the higher schools, and prepare them to take their place at the forefront of the nation's youth seeking Egypt's freedom from colonialism. A place was needed to gather them after graduation to spend their free time, so that each would not return to his village and lose contact with them when the nation needed them to face the British. The idea of founding Al Ahly Club was driven by patriotism and was believed in by men loyal to the nation.

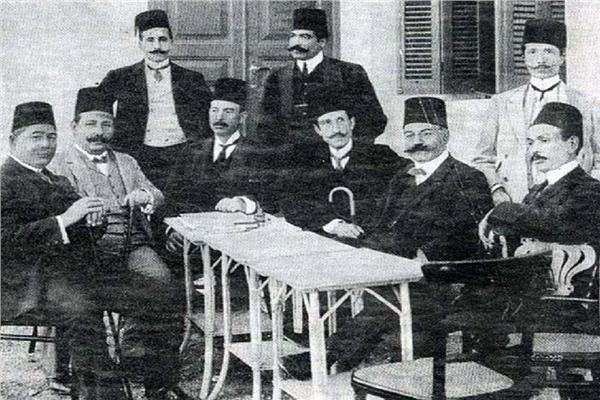
The first official meeting of the Al Ahly club's board

Omar Lotfy Bey met with patriotic figures and presented to them the idea of establishing Al Ahly Club. They included his lifelong friend Mustafa Kamil, the dean of the Faculty of Dar al-Ulum, a group of Egyptian ministers, governors and provincial directors from north to south, some who had laid the foundations of Egypt's economy and its Egyptianization, some who had founded the cooperative movement in Egypt, and a number of Al-Azhar sheikhs. He took their opinion on founding Al Ahly Club, and they unanimously agreed to establish it. Al Ahly Club was indeed founded, and Omar Lotfy Bey set the first example of self-denial in the club when he chose Mitchell-Innes as its first president, even though it was he who had conceived the idea, in order to favour the club's interests.

== Writings ==
Omar Lotfy Bey was widely read in law and economics and wrote several books on law, including: The Criminal Case in Islamic Law; The Inviolability of Homes; Women's Rights; The Right of Defense; Foreign Privileges; and The Concise Commentary on the Penal Code. His best-known book, which served as an early constitution for the cooperative movements, was Cooperative Companies in Egypt.

His works had a wide echo in the circles of European faculties before they were heard of in the Islamic world.

== Death ==
Omar Lotfy Bey died in Cairo on 14 November 1911, at the age of 44.

== Recognition ==
In the magazine Al-Ithnayn wa Al-Dunya, one of the largest magazines of the first half of the twentieth century, the historian Abd al-Rahman al-Rafai chose the ten greatest men in Egypt's history over fifty years. He ranked Omar Lotfy Bey ninth, after Mustafa Kamil Pasha, Mohammad Farid, Sheikh Muhammad Abduh, Saad Zaghloul, Ali Mubarak Pasha, Sheikh Abdullah an-Nadeem, the poet Ahmed Shawqi and the poet Hafez Ibrahim, and before the tenth, Talaat Harb.

== Elegy ==
The poet Ahmed Shawqi mourned Omar Lotfy Bey, the legal scholar, after his death:

قفوا بالقبور نسائلْ عمر
متى كانت الأرض مثوَى القمرْ؟
سلوا الأرض هل زُيِّنَتْ للعليمِ
وهل أُرِّجَتْ كالجنان الحفرْ؟
وهل قام ( رضوان ) من خلفها
يُلاقي الرضيَّ النقيَّ الأبرّ؟
فلو عَلِمَ الجمْع ممن مضى
تنحَّى له الجمع حتى عبرْ
إلى جنَّةٍ خُلقتْ للكريم
ومن عرف الله أو مَن قدرْ

English translation (loose):

Stand at the graves, let us ask Omar:
when was the earth ever a resting place for the moon?
Ask the earth: was it adorned for the learned man,
and did the grave grow fragrant like the gardens of Paradise?
Did Ridwan stand behind it
to meet the content, the pure, the most righteous?
Had the gatherings of those long gone known him,
they would have stepped aside for him until he passed
to a garden created for the noble,
for whoever knew God, or whoever had power.

== Tributes ==
Abdel Khalek Sarwat Pasha, president of Al Ahly Club and twice prime minister of Egypt, spoke of Omar Lotfy Bey after his death:

Now that we have finished the work of the general assembly, I take this opportunity to say a few words about the history of this club. If you kindly permit, the first thing my tongue will utter in this talk is the name of the late Omar Lotfy Bey, because he is the one who conceived this club and had the idea of founding it. The late Omar Bey Lotfy was deputy head of the School of Law, and at that time I was an official at the Ministry of Justice, so by virtue of our two posts we were in constant contact. As you know, may God have mercy on him, he was greatly occupied with the affairs of the young and deeply concerned for their conditions and for all that would benefit them. One day he came and told me he had often thought about the condition of the students of the higher schools and how they spent their free time, and about the relations of their graduates with one another. He saw that some students spent their time in public places with no form of exercise other than sitting in cafés, while others, who considered themselves above that, shut themselves up at home. And once students finished their studies and became occupied with earning a living, if they scattered across the country and went far from Cairo, the bonds of familiarity between them were cut and they became strangers to one another. He complained to me of this state and the moral and material harm that follows from it, and said that he saw the best remedy in establishing premises at a healthy spot outside the city, to be a meeting place for students of the higher schools and their graduates, where they would spend their free time and practice sports. It would also serve those students whom the struggle of life had forced to live outside Cairo as a means of meeting their brothers living in it whenever they had the chance to return. I did not hesitate for a moment in judging that realizing this idea would be the best way to serve Egyptian youth, but I will not hide from you that my hope for the project's success was far less than my fear that it could not be carried out, or that the club would fail after being founded. My excuse for this fear is that I judged by measuring the present against the past and the future against what had gone before: how many national projects arose with great fanfare and were embraced by the people, only to begin fading until nothing was left of them. Yet I did not want to dampen his resolve with these fears, and I said to myself, perhaps there is blessing in this movement. We agreed to work together, and he strove tirelessly, may God have mercy on him, until he succeeded in forming an association that took upon itself to pay the money to found the club, and it was indeed founded.

— Abdel Khalek Sarwat Pasha

Then Fekry Abaza Pasha said, amid loud applause from the members:

In my personal capacity, I thank His Excellency the eminent Minister for his great statements and precious advice, and I thank him for reviving the memory of the late public educator Omar Lotfy Bey, who thought of founding this club and the Higher Schools Club. We thank him from all our hearts and pray that God grant our elders and great men success in beneficial projects.
