= Mostafa Kamel Museum =

- Museum exterior, 2017
- Established: April 1956
- Location: Cairo, Egypt
- Coordinates: 30°1′46.45″N 31°15′26.46″E

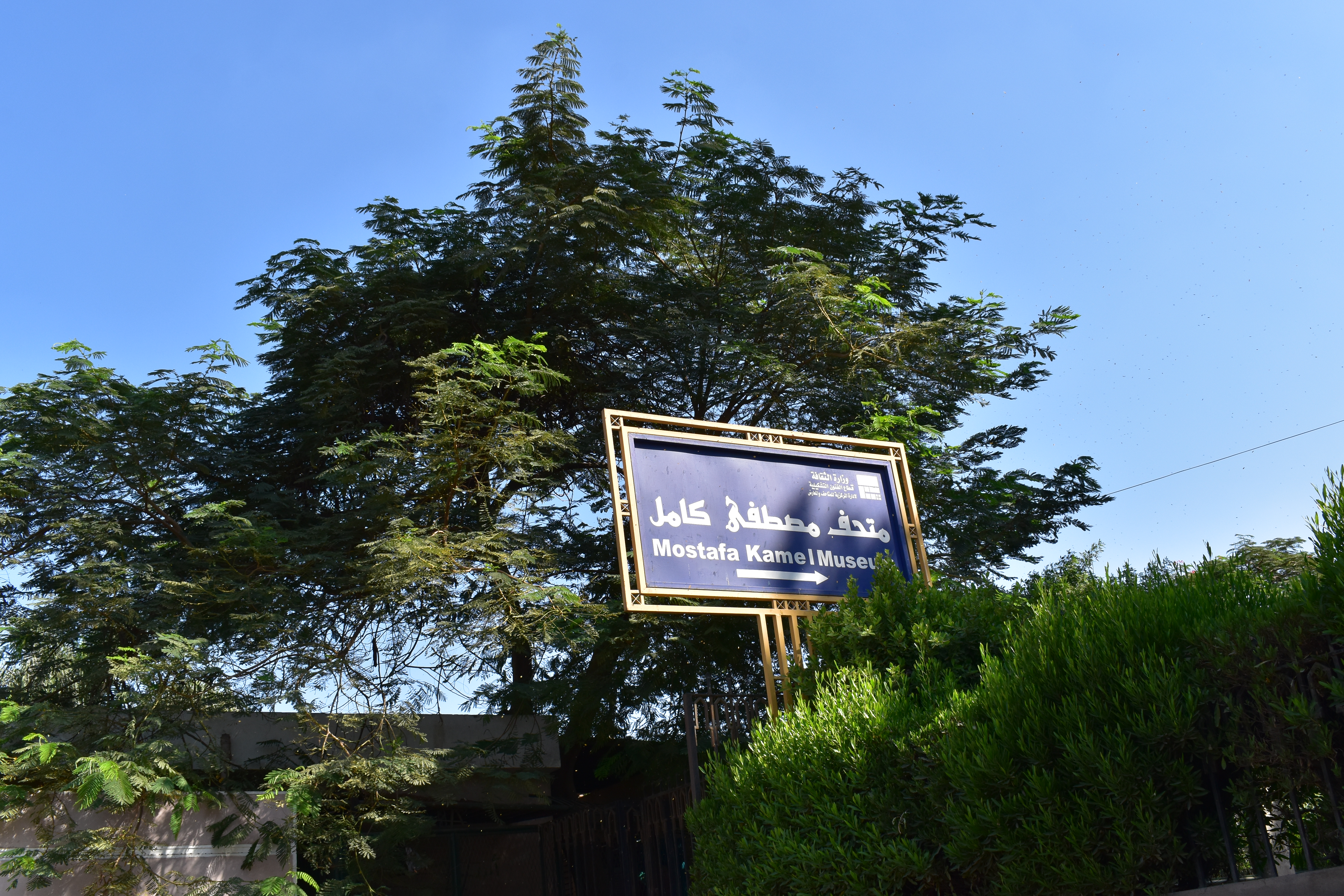
Entrance sign

The Mostafa Kamel Museum is a museum in Cairo. It was officially opened in April 1956. Before that, it was a mausoleum containing the remains of the two leaders, Mustafa Kamel and Muhammad Farid. It also houses the remains of the intellectuals and activists, Abd al-Rahman al-Rafei and Fathi Radwan. The museum is built in the style of the Islamic mausoleum dome and includes two halls containing some of the belongings of the leader Mustafa Kamel represented in his books and letters in his handwriting, and some pictures of his friends and relatives, as well as some of his personal belongings of clothes, dining utensils, and his office room. The museum also includes oil paintings depicting the Denshway incident. On February 8, 2001, the museum reopened after being restored.

The museum was vandalized and its contents were stolen on January 28, 2011, during the 2011 Egyptian revolution, and it was recovered by the tourism police and was restored. The museum was further restored with internal and external renovation and the restoration of the garden, fences, and office furniture. The exhibit display also was updated with the addition of rare photographs that show historical moments of Kamel and his closest companions' lives. The museum opened again in April 2016.

It is free for all visitors.
