= Labiba Ahmad =

Egyptian Islamic activist, philanthropist, traveller and writer

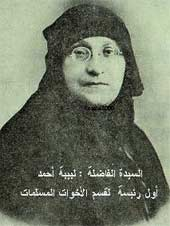
- Born: 1870s Cairo
- Died: 1951
- Occupations: Activist, philanthropist and writer

Labiba Ahmad (1870s – 1951) was an Egyptian Islamic activist, philanthropist, traveller and writer.

== Life ==
Labiba Ahmad was born in Cairo, the daughter of Ahmad 'Abd al-Nabi Bey, a medical doctor. She married 'Uthman Pasha Murtada, a judge, and had a son and five daughters. A nationalist, she joined Mustafa Kamil Pasha's Watani Party, and marched in the 1919 Ladies' Demonstrations. After the Egyptian Revolution of 1919, she did not join the Women's Wafd Central Committee associated with the Wafd Party. Instead, she founded the Society of Egyptian Ladies' Awakening, to promote Islamic nationalism and provide welfare services to the poor. She started a monthly magazine, al-Nahda al-Nisa`iyya (Women's Awakening) to promote the views of the Society.

Ahmad, unlike many of the new wave of Egyptian feminists, thought of women's rights in Islamic terms and wished to "create a new Islamic woman". She combined feminism with Islamic nationalism, and distanced herself from liberal feminist organizations at the time.
