= List of former political parties in Egypt =

Political Parties have existed in Egypt since the late 19th century, evolving in its organization and structure. They evolved in since that time till today. This article lists political parties that have existed in Egypt from the 19th century to the present. For the current state, see List of political parties in Egypt.

== History ==
Emergence of political parties in Egypt in the 20th century was a reflection of social, economic, and cultural interactions as well as certain historical, national and political circumstances, leading to the creation and development of modern institutions of government administration and society, such as the parliament, cabinets, political parties, syndicates, etc. This emergence has been gradual and has gone through successive stages. Political parties have firstly been formed as secret societies that were followed by formation of political groups.

The National Party, not to be confused with the later National Democratic Party (NDP), was the first party, formed in 1907 by Mostafa Kamel. In less than ten years, there was a great variety in these parties; in their nature, formation, organization, power, their popular base and platforms. There were national parties, groups dominated by the royal palace, others formed by the occupation authority as well as ideological parties expressing certain ideologies.

In 1907–1920, the already-formed political parties in Egypt were a starting signal for the dissemination of further parties; however, they were restricted due to the British occupation and Egyptian subordination to the Ottoman Empire. The February 1922 Unilateral Declaration of Egyptian Independence and the issuance of the 1923 Constitution led to the establishment of a royal constitutional rule based on party pluralism and the principles of liberal democracy.

During 1923–1952, Egypt witnessed a remarkable experience rich in political and democratic practices, however, such an experience was marked with many defects such as the British occupation, foreign intervention in Egypt's affairs and the royal palace's interference in political life. With the outbreak of the July 1952 Revolution, the Egyptian regime worked to liquidate the opposition. In January 1953, an enactment was adopted on disbanding the political parties and adoption of the one-party rule. The enactment of the parties' law in 1977 demonstrated Egypt's political regime officially turned into the era of party pluralism.

This practice of democracy has stopped for a period of time in Egyptian history. After the 1952 Revolution, all political parties were disbanded and replaced with a succession of government parties, which alone were allowed to operate. In 1977, with the enactment of the parties' law, Egypt returned to being a multi-party state but - at least until the ongoing Egyptian Revolution of 2011 - politics continued to be dominated by the government party, the National Democratic Party, with competing parties being allowed to operate having very little chance of attaining power.

== Monarchy (1850-1952) ==
- Hizb al-Umma (Umma Party/Nation's Party), a moderate nationalist party (1907–1925)
- National Party, an Anti-Imperialist, conservative, nationalist party (1907–1953)
- Wafd (al Wafd al Misri, Egyptian Delegation), a national-liberal party (1919–1953)
- Liberal Constitutional Party
- Federal Party
- Hizb ash-Shaab (People's Party), the party of Ismail Sedki opposed to the Wafd Party (1930–1946)
- Ittihad Party (Union Party), a royalist party
- Saadist Institutional Party, founded in 1938, named after Saad Zaghloul
- Hizb Al-Ikhwan Al-Muslimeen, The Muslim Brotherhood Party (1930-1946) founded by Hasaan al-Benna (1930-1946) was a far-right Islamist party with nationalistic undertones.

== Post-independence period (1953-1977) ==
Following the 1952 revolution, political parties were outlawed by the Revolutionary Command Council and a single government party was founded to mobilize support for the government. This was in turn superseded by similar parties, centred on supporting the government and President Gamal Abdel Nasser. It remained so under Nasser's successor Anwar El Sadat, for the first seven years of his rule, before multiparty elections were allowed again in 1977.

- Liberation Rally (1953-1957)
- National Union (1957-1962)
- Arab Socialist Union (1962-1978)

== Restricted partisan pluralism (1977 - January 25, 2011) ==
• The Socialist Liberal Party (1976 — 2011).

• The National Democratic Party (1978 - 2011).

== After the 2011 Revolution ==
- Freedom and Justice Party (2011 - 2014)
