= Abdelghani Ibrahim =

Egyptian writer

- Born: 1878
- Died: 1962 (aged 83–84)

Abdelghani Ibrahim (1878–1962) was an Egyptian poet. Abdelghani is one of the country's most important early-twentieth-century poets. He grew up in Alexandria. His family's assets went to support the Baz family.

== Revolutionary ==
He participated in the revolutionary struggle against the British colonialists. He participated with Mustafa Kamil Pasha and Mohammad Farid through his work on the Major and Mokattam and Ambassador newspapers.

He received a baccalaureate while participating with Saad Zaghloul Pasha in the struggle in Alexandria, Cairo and chaired the headquarters of the Wafd Party. He participated with senior poets of the Arab world in the book Tears poets (demoa el shoaaraa) that lamented the Saad Zaghloul Pasha in 1927, including Ahmed Shawqi, Hafez Ibrahim and Khalil Mutran. He was involved with the artist Sayed Darwish. He wrote some of the songs that Darwish sang at the beginning of the twentieth century. He worked with Salama Hegazi and with artist Naguib el-Rihani. He wrote songs for singers such as Mounira El Mahdeya and Shafia Ahmed.

== Legacy ==
Abdelghani Ibrahim had many children. His sons included Mustafa, Mohammed, Hussein, Anwar, Farouk, El sayed, Ibrahim. He died in 1962 at age 84.
