= Rafei =

Rafei, Rafeie or Rafai are common variant English transliterations of the Arabic surname رافعی and الرافعي

It may refer to:

- Abd al-Majid al-Rafei (born 1927), Lebanese politician, former Lebanese MP
- Abd al-Rahman al-Rafai (1889–1966), Egyptian historian
- Bob Rafei (born 1969), Iranian video game art director, character animator and concept artist
- Mostafa Saadeq Al-Rafe'ie (1880–1937), Egyptian poet of Lebanese origin
