= Abdul Ganiyu =

Abdul Ganiyu or Abdul-Ganiyu is a West African masculine given name and surname. Notable people with the name include:

== Given name ==
- Abdulganiyu Abdulrasaq (1927–2020), Nigerian politician
- Abdul Ganiyu Agbaje (born 1925), Nigerian judge
- Abdul Ganiyu Ambali (1957–2026), Nigerian academic and university administrator
- Abdulganiyu Audu, Nigerian politician
- Abdulganiyu Saka Cook Olododo (born 1960), Nigerian politician
- Abdul Ganiyu Salami (born 1942), Nigerian and Ghanaian footballer

== Surname ==
- Ismail Abdul-Ganiyu (born 1996), Ghanaian footballer

== See also ==
- Ganiyu
- Abdul Ghani
