= Ahmed Hafiz Awad =

- أحمد حافظ عوض
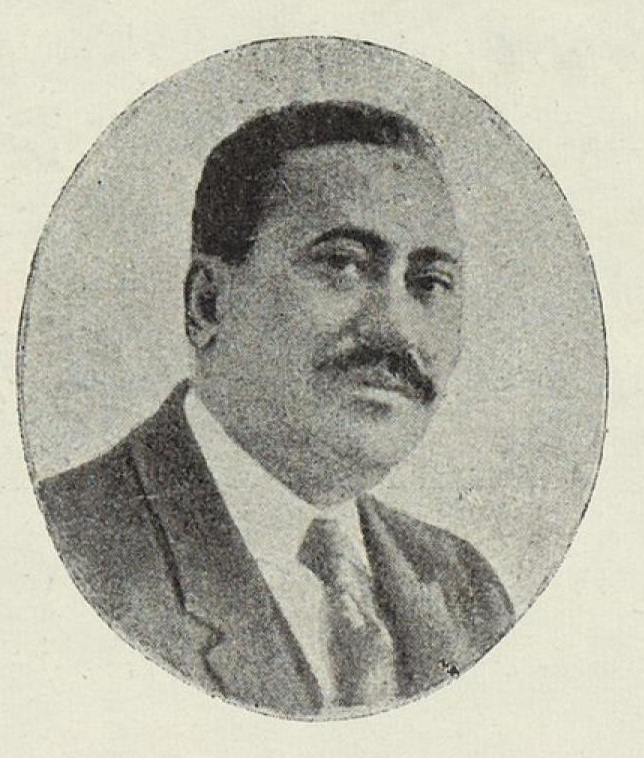
- Born: 1874; Damanhur, Beheira Governorate, Egypt
- Died: 1950 (aged 75–76); Cairo, Egypt
- Education: Al-Azhar; Higher Teachers' College
- Occupations: Journalist; Editor-in-chief; Newspaper founder; Member of Parliament; Translator; Private Secretary
- Known for: Serving as private secretary to Abbas Helmy II of Egypt; Khedive Abbas Helmy II; Founding Kawkab Al-Sharq newspaper
- Notable work: The Modern Conquest of Egypt: Napoleon Bonaparte in Egypt
- Office: Member of the Egyptian Parliament
- Political party: Wafd Party

Ahmed Hafiz Awad (أحمد حافظ عوض; Aḥmad Ḥāfiẓ ʿAwaḍ;1874–1950) was an Egyptian journalist who worked as an editor for the Al Liwa newspaper (1898–1906). He was a Member of Parliament, as well as a member of the Arabic Language Academy in 1942. He founded several newspapers, including Al-Adab, Al-Ahali, and Kawkab Al-Sharq, and was a private and close secretary to Khedive Abbas Helmy II. He authored some well-known books, including The Modern Conquest of Egypt: Napoleon Bonaparte in Egypt.

== Life ==
He was born in the city of Damanhur, Beheira Governorate, in 1874. He began his education in a Kuttab and later completed it at the honorable Al-Azhar. He graduated from Al-Tawfikiya Secondary School and then from the Higher Teachers' College.

== Career ==
Ahmed Hafiz Awad served as a private secretary to Khedive Abbas Helmy II. He also worked as a translator from English before joining the newspaper Al-Mu'ayyad, where he was an editor from 1898 to 1906, eventually becoming its editor-in-chief.

During World War I, Awad withdrew from public life. He later became involved with the Wafd Party following the Egyptian Revolution of 1919. During this period, he founded several newspapers, including Al-Adab, Al-Ahali (with Abd al-Qadir Hamza), and Kawkab Al-Sharq. The latter was a daily newspaper aligned with the Wafd Party that was published for nearly two decades and featured contributions from prominent writers such as Taha Hussein, Abbas Mahmoud Al-Aqqad, and Fuad Shakr. His home became a salon for Egyptian and Arab literary figures, including Ahmed Shawqi, Al-Muwaylihi, Muhammad Kurd Ali, and Mohammad Amin al-Husayni, the Grand Mufti of Palestine. In Cairo, he also launched the satirical magazine Khayal al-Zill al-Hazliya (The Comic Shadow Play), publishing it in 1908 and again in 1924.

He was appointed a member of the Egyptian Parliament and was also a member of the Fuad I Academy for the Arabic Language. Following the end of World War I and the adoption of the 1923 Constitution, Awad, then editor of Al-Mahrousa, joined Amin Al-Rafi'i (owner of Al-Akhbar) and Leon Castro (founder of Liberté magazine) in a meeting with Prime Minister Saad Zaghloul. They collectively demanded the enactment of a law to establish a syndicate for journalists.

Ahmed Hafiz Awad held several prominent positions. He served as a private secretary to Khedive Abbas Helmy II, accompanied him on the Hajj pilgrimage, and became privy to his political secrets, particularly his dealings with Evelyn Baring, 1st Earl of Cromer. In addition to his work as the Khedive's translator in Egypt, he also acted as his press delegate. Awad was described as having "a pen devoted to serving the Khedive."

This loyalty was noted by Mohamed Farid in his memoirs, where he wrote that "Othman, Hafiz Awad, and others sought to persuade students in Paris to align themselves with the Khedive." During his career, Awad also met the Indian poet Rabindranath Tagore.

== Later life ==
In his later years, Awad fell ill, which led him to cease publication of his newspaper, Kawkab Al-Sharq. He was confined to his home for several years and passed away in Cairo in 1950.
