= Muhammad Hafiz Ramadan Pasha =

Egyptian politician (died 1955)

- محمد حافظ رمضان باشا

Minister of State
- In office 30 December 1937 – 27 April 1938 Serving with Mohammed Hussein Heikal Abdul Aziz Fahmy Ahmed Lutfi el-Sayed
- Prime Minister: Mohamed Mahmoud Pasha
- Succeeded by: Ahmed Lutfi El-Sayed

Ministry of Social Solidarity
- In office 27 June 1940 – 14 November 1940
- Prime Minister: Hassan Sabry Pasha
- Preceded by: Abdel Salam El Shazly Bey
- Succeeded by: Muhammad Abdul Jalil Abu Samra Bek

Minister of Justice
- In office 8 October 1944 – 9 December 1945
- Prime Minister: Ahmad Maher Pasha Mahmoud El Nokrashy Pasha
- Preceded by: Muhammad Sabri Abu Alam Pasha
- Succeeded by: Mohamed Kamel Morsi Pasha

Personal details
- Born: 1879
- Died: 7 February 1955 (aged 75–76)
- Party: National Party (Egypt)

Muhammad Hafiz Ramadan Pasha (died 1955) (Arabic: محمد حافظ رمضان باشا) was an Egyptian lawyer, editor, and politician. He was head of the National Party in the 1920s and Minister of Social Affairs and Minister of Justice during the 1940s.

== Career ==
Hafiz Ramadan Pasha was born and died in Cairo. He graduated from the Khedivial Law School in 1904. He succeeded Muhammad Farid as head of the Watani Party in 1923. He was the elected head of the Egyptian bar association from 1926 to 1927 after serving as vice president from 1925 to 1926. He became lead of the opposition in parliament in 1926.

== Published works ==
- Abu al-Hul Qala Li, volume 1 (Arabic: أبو الهول قال لي) (1944).
- Ṣafḥah siyāsīyah : majmūʻat khuṭab fī al-ḥamalāt al-intikhābīyah sanat 1913 (Arabic: صفحة سياسية : مجموعة خطب في الحملات الإنتخابات سنة ١٩١٣) (1923).
- Ahadith wa Mudhakkirat fi al-Qadiya al-Misriya (Arabic: أحاديث و مذكرات في القضية المصرية).
