= Al Liwa (newspaper) =

Newspaper in Egypt (1900–1912)

- Founder: Mustafa Kamil Pasha
- Founded: 2 January 1900
- Ceased publication: 31 August 1912
- Political alignment: Nationalist (1900–1908); Pan-Islamist (1908–1910)
- Language: Arabic
- Headquarters: Cairo
- Country: Egypt

Al Liwa (Arabic: The Standard) was a nationalist newspaper which was published in Cairo, Egypt, in the period 1900–1912. It was the first mass circulation newspaper in the country. The paper was founded by Mustafa Kamil Pasha. From its start in 1900 to the death of its founder in 1908, Al Liwa adopted a nationalist political stance. Between 1907 and 1910 it was the official organ of the National Party which was also established by Mustafa Kamil Pasha. The paper adopted a pan-Islamist political stance between 1908 and 1910. Al Liwa was not affiliated with the National Party from 1910 to August 1912 when it was closed down.

== History and profile ==
Mustafa Kamil Pasha launched Al Liwa in 1900 when Al Muayyad, a newspaper in which he published articles, was shut down by the British. The first issue appeared on 2 January that year. The paper had a biweekly supplement entitled Majallat Al Liwa. Al Liwa became popular among young men and one of the most read newspapers in the country. It had the largest readership of 14,000 in the period 1900–1908.

Kamil's articles published in the paper mostly contained his call to resist British existence in Egypt. In 1906 the paper harshly criticized the appointment of Saad Zaghloul as education minister due to his pro-British tendency. In March 1907 the French and English language editions of Al Liwa were launched, namely L'Etendard Egyptien and The Standard Egyptian, respectively. All of these publications were financed by Khedive Abbas Hilmi. In 1908 one of the contributors of the paper was Salama Moussa.

Kamil established a political party, the National Party (mostly known as Al-Watani party or Patriotic Party), in Alexandria on 22 October 1907, and Al Liwa became its official organ. Following the death of Mustafa Kamil on 10 February 1908 Mohammad Farid took over the leadership of the party and reshaped the ideological approach of the paper. Farid fired Mahmud Izzat who had been the executive director of Al Liwa and who was close to Ali Fahmi Kamil, brother of the Mustafa Kamil. In addition, Farid appointed a new editor-in-chief to the paper, Abdulaziz Jawish, who was a religious conservative figure. In 1909 the French and English editions of Al Liwa ceased publication.

Jawish published articles in the paper, criticising the Khedive and his Coptic Prime Minister Boutros Ghali. He supported radical conservative views which led to his arrest and imprisonment in 1909. However, Jawish's writings produced much more significant consequences for both Muslims and Copts in that Prime Minister Boutros Ghali was assassinated by Ibrahim Al Wardani on 21 February 1910. Wardani was close to the National party. The British authorities demanded that the paper should change its editorial stance, but Farid denied their request. Instead, he announced that Al Liwa was not affiliated to the National party anymore. Farid and other party members established another paper, Al Alam, which was made the official organ of the National party. The last issue of Al Liwa was published on 31 August 1912.
