= Al-Mu'ayyad (newspaper) =

Defunct newspaper in Egypt (1889–1900)

- Type: Daily newspaper
- Founder: Ali Yusuf
- Founded: 1889
- Ceased publication: 1900
- Language: Arabic
- Headquarters: Cairo
- Country: Egypt

Al-Mu'ayyad (Arabic: The Supporter) was an Arabic daily newspaper published in Egypt in the period 1889 to 1900. It was one of the influential dailies of that period in Egypt.

== History and profile ==
Al-Mu'ayyad was launched by Ali Yusuf in 1889. He also edited the paper. Al-Mu'ayyad was considered to be an anti-imperialist and pan-Islamic publication and received covert funding from Khedive Abbas Hilmi. It frequently published articles praising the Khedive emphasizing his closeness to his subjects. The paper was one of the Egyptian publications which advocated Jamal al-Din al-Afghani's ijtihad view.

As of 1897 the paper had nearly six thousands subscribers like Al-Ahram and Al Muqattam. There was a heated debate between Al-Mu'ayyad and Al Muqattam during the British occupation of Egypt between 1892 and 1914 in that the latter was an ardent supporter of the British and Al-Mu'ayyad a militant supporter of the independence of Egypt.

One of the most significant contributors of Al-Mu'ayyad was Mustafa Kamil Pasha. The paper was closed down by the British authorities in 1900. Following this incident Mustafa Kamil Pasha established his own newspaper, Al Liwa, to publish his views.

Al-Mu'ayyad returned as a weekly, published until 1914.
