= Society of Egyptian Ladies' Awakening =

1920 women's society

The Society of Egyptian Ladies' Awakening was founded in 1920 by Labiba Ahmad in the wake of the 1919 "Ladies' Demonstrations". It ran an orphanage for girls in al-Sayyidah Zaynab, ran a workshop to teach poor girls handicrafts and household management, and taught Islamic and nationalist principles. The Society opened an "Institute and Workshop of the Women's Awakening" in 1923. It also planned lectures on morality and religious topics. The Society called for women to focus on their households and maintain modesty, while encouraging education of women and their contributions to society.

The Society had a monthly journal, al-Nahda al-Nisa`iyya (Women's Awakening), which publicized the society's mission and raised funds for the orphanage and other projects. The Society was also partly funded by sales of Ahmad's book and the Egyptian government. It likely became self-sufficient during its later years of operation, as the girls they taught learned marketable skills.

The Society operated until Ahmad's death in 1951.
