= Ganiyu =

Ganiyu is a Nigerian name that may refer to

== Ganiyu ==
- Gani Adams (Ganiyu Adams, born 1970), Nigerian social activist and politician
- Ganiyu Akanbi Bello (1930–2014), Nigerian community leader and business tycoon
- Ganiyu Dawodu (1933–2006), Nigerian politician and democracy activist
- Ganiyu Oseni (born 1991), Nigerian football striker
- Ganiyu Solomon (born 1959), Nigerian politician
- Muideen Ganiyu (born 1979), Nigerian boxer

== See also ==
- Abdul Ganiyu
