= Abdulghani Muneer =

Qatari footballer (born 1992)

Personal information
- Full name: Abdulghani Muneer
- Date of birth: 13 September 1992 (age 34)
- Place of birth: Qatar
- Position: Winger

Senior career*
Years	Team	Apps	(Gls)
2012–2021	Al-Gharafa	67	(2)
2013–2014	→ Al-Kharaitiyat (loan)	17	(0)
2021	→ Al-Wakrah (loan)	10	(1)
2021–2023	Al-Wakrah	26	(1)
2023–2025	Muaither		
- * Club domestic league appearances and goals

Abdulghani Muneer (Arabic:عبد الغني منير; born 13 September 1992) is a Qatari footballer. He plays as a winger.
