= Abdelghani Akbi =

Minister of Commerce of Algeria
- In office March 1979 – July 15, 1980
- President: Chadli Bendjedid
- Prime Minister: Mohamed Ben Ahmed Abdelghani
- Preceded by: M'hamed Yala
- Succeeded by: Abdelaziz Khellef

Personal details
- Born: March 20, 1933 (age 93)
- Party: FLN
- Education: University of California, Riverside

Military service
- Battles/wars: Algerian War

Abdelghani Akbi is an Algerian politician who served as Minister of Commerce from 1979 to 1980.

== Biography ==
Akbi was born on March 20, 1933. He received a law degree from the University of California, Riverside. During the Algerian War, he served as a commander in the FLN. Following Algerian independence, Akbi held several wali and gubernatorial positions in Sétif Province in 1964, Batna Province and Oran Province in 1965, and Constantine Province in 1974.

In March 1979, Akbi was appointed Minister of Commerce in the government of Prime Minister Mohamed Ben Ahmed Abdelghani under President Chadli Bendjedid. Akbi left this post during the ministerial reshuffle in July 1980. He later pursued a career in diplomacy, serving as the Algerian ambassador to Italy in 1970, Tunisia in 1982, China in 1984, and Niger in 1990. In 2010, Akbi was appointed to the Council of the Nation.
