= Abd al-Rahman al-Rafai =

Egyptian historian

- عبد الرحمن الرافعي
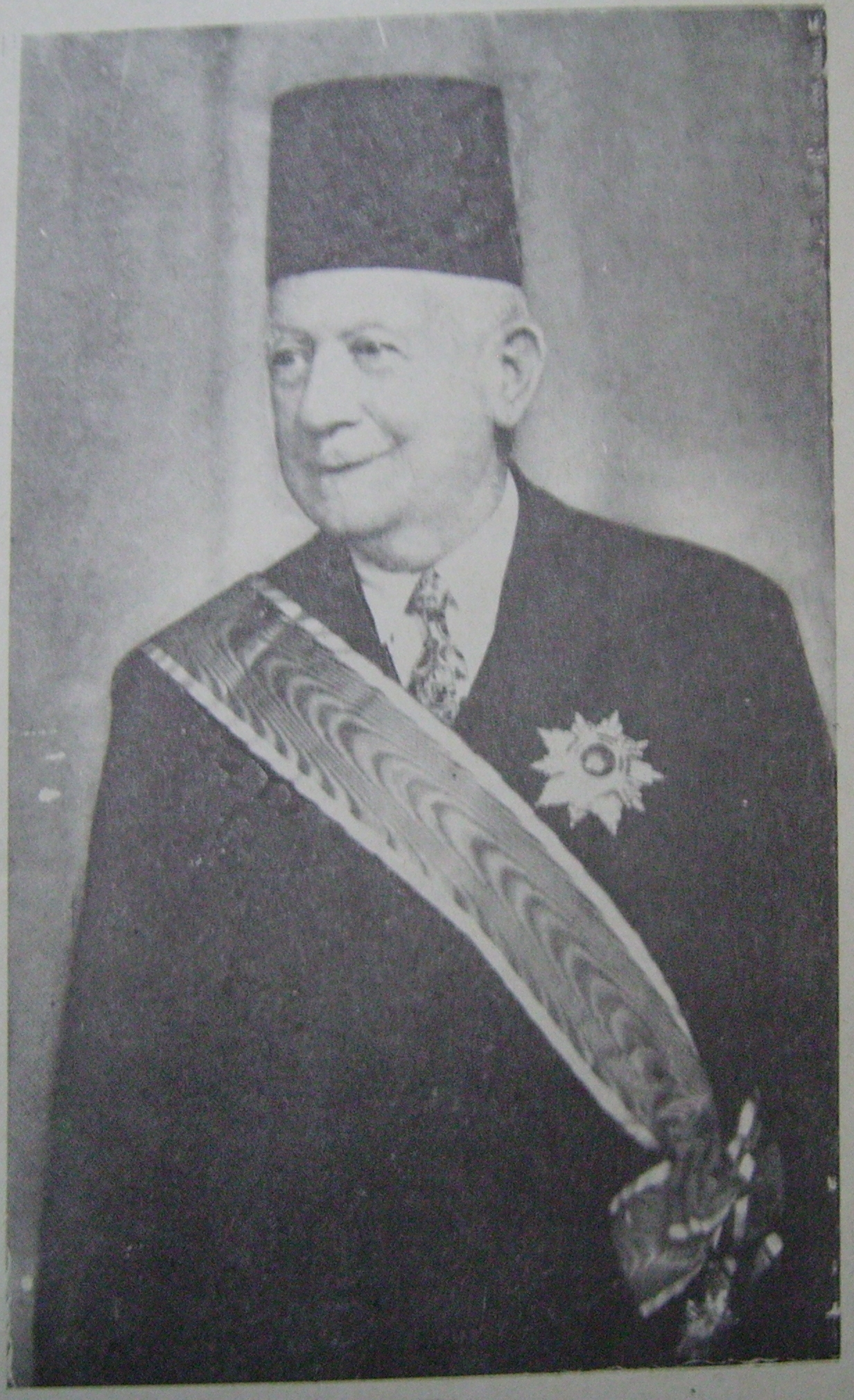
- Abd al-Rahman al-Rafai

Member of Parliament
- In office 1924–1926

Senator
- In office 1944–1949

Minister of Supply
- In office 1949 – (within 1949)

President of the Egyptian Bar Association
- In office 1954–1958

Personal details
- Born: February 8, 1889 Cairo, Egypt
- Died: December 3, 1966 (aged 77)
- Party: National (Watani) Party
- Education: Khadawia School of Law (graduated 1908)
- Occupation: Historian; politician; lawyer; journalist
- Awards: State Merit Prize for Social Sciences (1961)

Abd al-Rahman al-Rafai (February 8, 1889 – December 3, 1966) (عبد الرحمن الرافعي) was an Egyptian historian. He dedicated his life to the study of the roles of the national movement in the history of modern Egypt. His most prominent work was 15 volumes in which he documented the state of Egypt from the late 18th century to the mid-19th century. He was born in Cairo even though his family was from the Levant countries. He graduated from the Khadawia school of law in 1908. He spent most of his life in Cairo but moved to Alexandria for high school.immediately after his graduation he practiced law for less than a month until Mohammad Farid محمد فريد (a prominent lawyer and historian) asked him to become the editor of the Major General Al-San newspaper بجريدة اللواء لسان and this proved to be the first step in his life as a historian and a politician.

== Politics ==
In 1907 he became a part of Egyptian national party that was led by Mostafa Kamel Pasha مصطفى كامل who was also a journalist and a political figure. At that point al-Rafai started to become concerned with the relationship of national history in terms of national awareness, and the emergence and development of the modern nation-state.

== Contributions ==
Al-Rafai started writing at an early age. His first book was written in 1912 by the name of The People's Rights "حقوق الشعب". In this book he showed his political views by writing about issues such as constitutional rule and national independence, rule of law and human rights from different aspects of Islam. He also discussed in his book ideas about the European Enlightenment Era.

His second book Unions of Agricultural Cooperation "نقابات التعاون الزراعي" was published in 1914. In this book he drew the nation's attention to the importance of development of rural areas is different aspects such as physical, socially and humanly. He also focused on education in this book. Al-Rafai emphasized that education should be guaranteed by the state and should have the priority of improvement over many smaller issues.

Al-Rafai wrote his third book in 1922 titled National Societies "الجمعيات الوطنية" where he spoke about the relationship between the social and political cohesion and economic growth.

His most famous achievement is a 16 volume book that he had started to compose in the 18th century and didn't finish it until his fifties.

Numerous historians have agreed that Al-Rafai researched and collected the most data concerning these topic that could have been known during that period in time and in his circumstances which makes is why his work became a strong basis to the history of systematic in Egypt and the Arab world as a whole.

== Literature ==
- Masr Al Mogahida Fi Al Asr Al Hadith - Dar AL Hilal - 1989
