= Abdulghani Halalu =

Palestinian politician

Member of the Politburo of the Democratic Front for the Liberation of Palestine

In-charge of the Syria Region of DFLP

Personal details
- Born: 1947 Jaffa, Mandatory Palestine
- Died: 5 November 2017 (aged 69–70)
- Party: Democratic Front for the Liberation of Palestine
- Profession: Politician

Abdulghani Halalu (Arabic: عبد الغني هللو, kunya: 'Abu Khaldun') (1947 – November 5, 2017) is a Palestinian politician. As of 2015, he was a member of the politburo of the Democratic Front for the Liberation of Palestine and in-charge of the Syria Region of DFLP.

Halalu was born in Jaffa in 1947. His family fled to Syria during the 1948 Palestinian expulsion and flight. Halalu was a co-founder of the DFLP in 1969. He was a fighter in Jordan, but later returned to Syria. He acted as the DFLP representative in Baghdad, then in the Libyan capital Tripoli, before returning again to Syria to take charge of the international representative of the movement. He later became the leader of DFLP in Syria. Halalu was a member of the Palestinian National Council, the Arab National Conference and the Arab People's Conference.
