= Abdul Ghani bin Ishak =

Malaysian politician

Yang Berhormat Abdul Ghani bin Ishak JMN

Member of the Malaysian Parliament for Melaka Utara

Personal details
- Born: Melaka Utara, Malacca
- Education: Maktab Perguruan Sultan Idris

Abdul Ghani Ishak is a Perikatan/ UMNO politician in Malaysia. He was elected during 1959 Malayan general election for Melaka Utara parliament for the state of Melaka (1958–1964).

== History ==
He was born in Melaka and educated at Maktab Perguruan Sultan Idris. He later on become a Malay School Teacher.

He was one of the members for the influential education report Laporan Abdul Rahman Talib.

In 1985, he was convicted for corruption and abuse of power.

== Election Results ==
Parliament of the Federation of Malaya
Year	Constituency	Candidate	Votes	Pct	Opponent(s)	Votes	Pct	Ballots cast	Majority	Turnout
1959	P11 Melaka Utara	Abdul Ghani bin Ishak (UMNO)	11,078	48.31%	Ab. Karim bin Bakar (PRM)	2,872	12.54%	22,930	6,617	81.09%
1959	P11 Melaka Utara	Abdul Ghani bin Ishak (UMNO)	11,078	48.31%	H. Karim bin H. Dalib (PMIP)	4,461	19.45%	22,930	6,617	81.09%

Malacca State Legislative Assembly
Year	Constituency	Candidate	Votes	Pct	Opponent(s)	Votes	Pct	Ballots cast	Majority	Turnout
1969	S13 Masjid Tanah	Abdul Ghani bin Ishak (UMNO)	2,850	41.60%	Mohd Yusoff bin Sulong (PMIP)	1,856	27.10%	6,851	994	76.02%
1974	N04 Kelemak	Abdul Ghani bin Ishak (UMNO)	3,218	45.60%	A. Kadir bin Hamid (PEKEMAS)	1,513	23.31%	6,489	1,705	78.24%
