= Mohamed Abdulghani =

Ethiopian economist and politician

Mohamed Abdulghani محمد عبد الغني
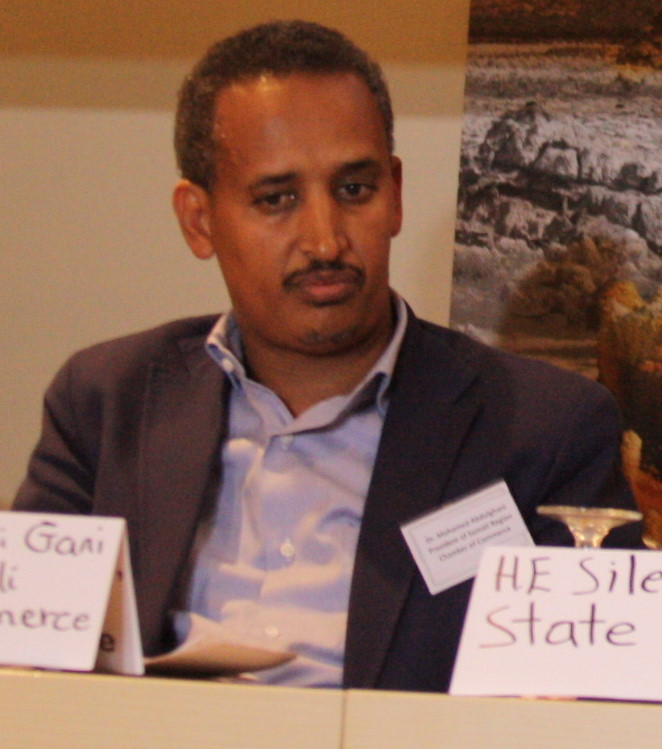

President of the Somali Region Chamber of Commerce
- Prime Minister: Meles Zenawi; Hailemariam Desalegn

Mohamed Abdulghani (Somali: Maxamed Cabduulgaani, Arabic: محمد عبد الغني) is an Ethiopian economist and politician of the Somali ethnicity who is the President of the Somali Region Chamber of Commerce based in Jijiga, Ethiopia.
