= Abdul Ghani Ghani =

Afghan politician

Abdul Ghani Ghani عبدالغنی غنی

Meshrano Jirga
- In office 2005–2009

Personal details
- Born: Afghanistan
- Occupation: Politician

Abdul Ghani Ghani (Dari: عبدالغنی غنی) is representative from Balkh Province to the Meshrano Jirga, the upper house of Afghanistan's national legislature.

He was selected to sit in the upper house by the Balkh Provincial Council elected in 2005.

== See also ==
- Politics of Afghanistan
