= Abdulganiyu Audu =

Nigerian politician

Member of the House of Assembly of Nigeria(2015–2019) from Edo
- Constituency: Etsako West

Personal details
- Citizenship: Nigeria
- Occupation: Politician

Abdulganiyu Audu is a Nigerian politician who served as a member of the Edo State House of Assembly representing Etsako West under the platform of the All Progressives Congress (APC) from 2015 to 2019.

On September 19, 2020, during the governorship election in Edo State, Abdulganiyu Audu was accused of certificate forgery by Mr. Osagie Ize-Iyamu, the ADP governorship candidate, who submitted the allegations to the Independent National Electoral Commission (INEC).
