= National Party (Egypt) =

National Party الحزب الوطني
- Historical leaders: Mustafa Kamil Pasha (1895–1908); Mohammad Farid (1908–1919); Hafiz Ramadan Pasha (1919-1952)
- Founder: Mustafa Kamil Pasha
- Founded: 1895; 1907 (As a political party)
- Dissolved: July 23, 1952
- Headquarters: Alexandria
- Newspaper: Al Liwa
- Ideology: Egyptian nationalism Anti-imperialism
- Political position: Right-wing
- Colours: Green

The National Party (Arabic: ﺍﻟﺤﺰﺐ ﺍﻟﻮﻃﻨﻲ, al-Ḥizb al-Waṭanī) was a nationalist political party in Egypt.

Founded as an Egyptian nationalist political movement in 1895, the Watani was led by Mustafa Kamil Pasha, a Francophile journalist from Alexandria. The National Party platform was composed mainly by the city bourgeoisie, the monarchy's sympathizers and also by the Khedive Abbas II, a noted anglophobe. The party published a newspaper from 1900, Al Liwa (Arabic: The Standard), with clear anti-British views. In the same year, Abdul Hamid II nominated Mustafa Kamil as pasha for his support to the Ottoman Empire. Its anti-British positions intensified after the Denshawai Incident in 1906.

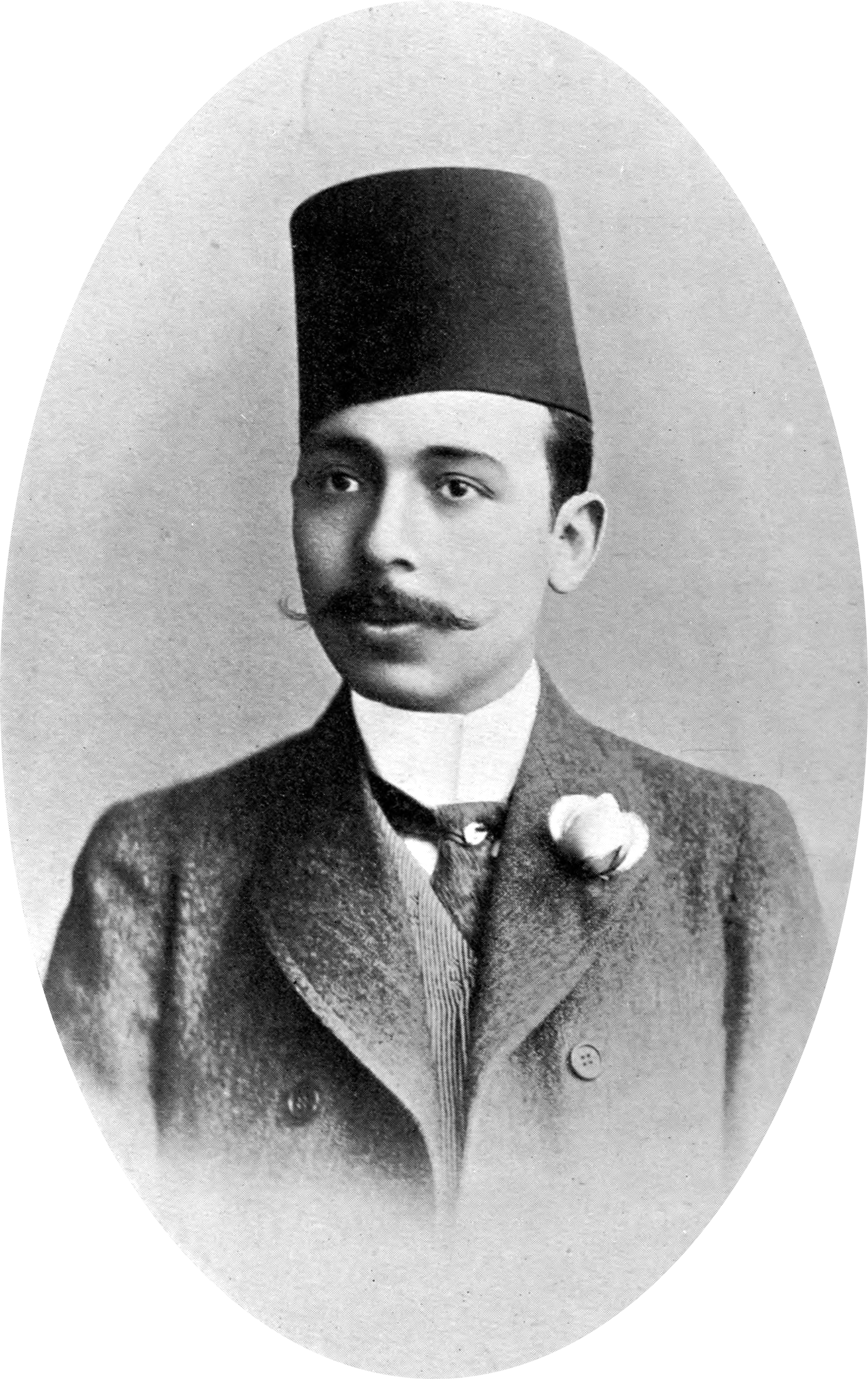
Mustafa Kamil Pasha, founder the National Party. He was also one of the most prominent figures of the Egyptian Nationalist Movement of the early 20th century

The movement became officially a party on 22 October 1907, after the first Congress of the National Party. During the Congress, Mustafa Kamil supported the constitutional monarchy. However, Kamil died only two months after the Congress and the National Party was inherited by Mohammad Farid. Under Farid's leadership, the party supported the monarchy, law and order policies and statism, especially after the Prime Minister Boutros Ghali's assassination in 1910. Ironically, Boutros Ghali's assassin was a National Party sympathizer.

After the First World War ended and the death of Farid in 1919, the party began to decline. Mohammad Hafiz Ramadan Bey led the National Party and started a pro-Wafd policy, so that the Wafd became the leading political party in Egypt. The National Party didn't win many seats in the elections, and after the Egyptian Revolution of 1952, the party was banned.

== Ideas and Goals ==
- The evacuation of the British from Egypt.
- Instilling the national spirit in the people.
- A constitution that guarantees parliamentary oversight of the government.
- Promotion of agriculture, industry, trade and work for the scientific and economic independence of the nation.

== Electoral history ==
=== House of Representatives elections ===
| Election | Party leader | Seats | +/– | Position |
|---|---|---|---|---|
| 1926 | Hafiz Ramadan | 5 / 215 | ▲5 | ▲4th |
| 1936 | Hafiz Ramadan | 4 / 232 | ▼3 | ▲3rd |
| 1942 | Hafiz Ramadan | 2 / 264 | ▼2 | 3rd |
| 1945 | Hafiz Ramadan | 7 / 264 | ▲5 | ▼4th |
| 1950 | Hafiz Ramadan | 6 / 319 | ▼1 | 4th |
