= Mustafa Kamil Pasha =

Egyptian lawyer, journalist, and nationalist activist (1874-1908)

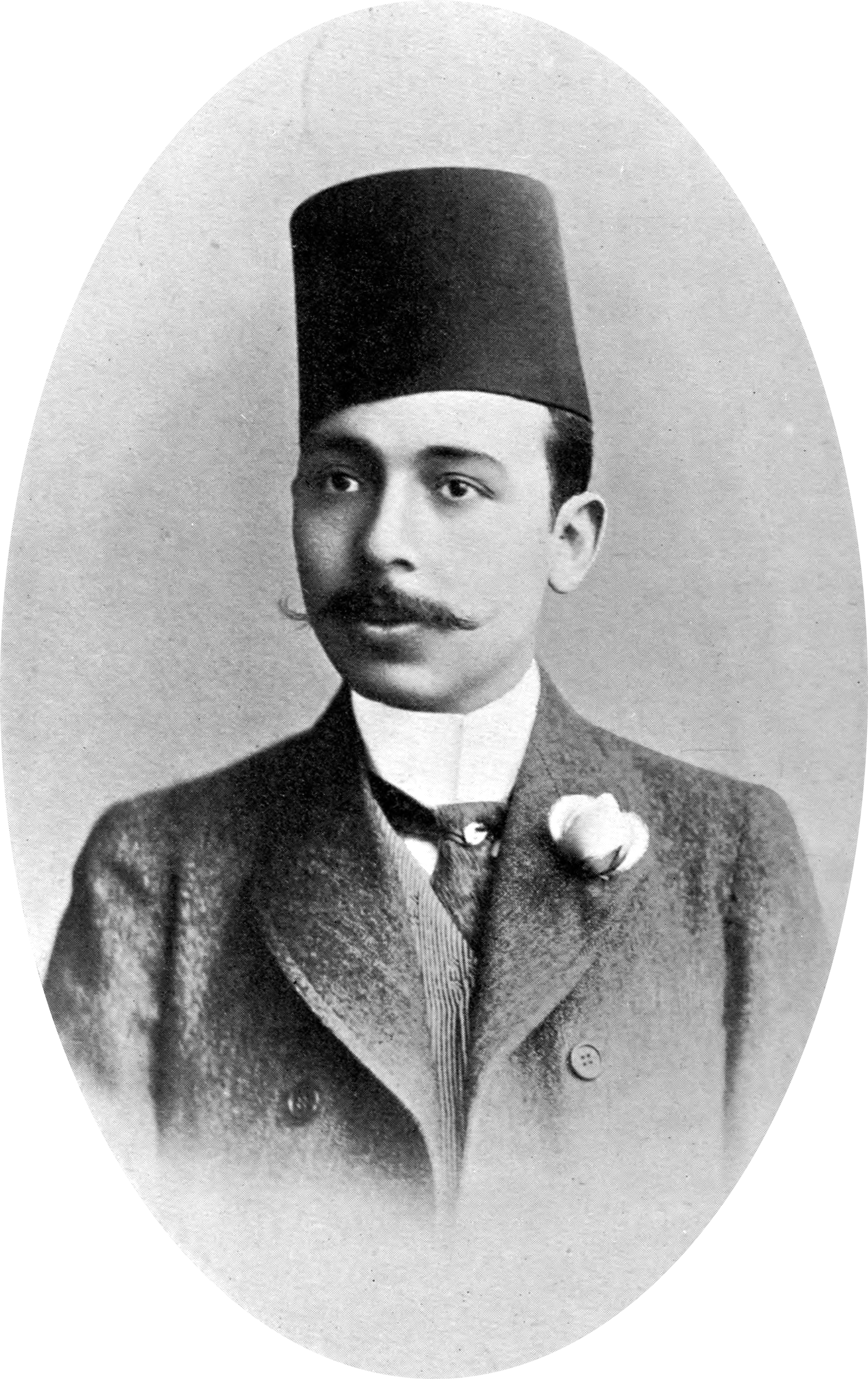
- Born: August 14, 1874; Cairo, Khedivate of Egypt, Ottoman Empire
- Died: February 10, 1908 (aged 33); Cairo, Khedivate of Egypt, Ottoman Empire
- Political party: National Party

Mustafa Kamil Pasha (Arabic: مصطفى كامل, IPA: [mosˈtˤɑfɑ ˈkæːmel]) (August 14, 1874 – February 10, 1908) was an Egyptian lawyer, journalist, and nationalist activist.

== Early life and education ==
Kamil was born in Cairo in 1874. His father was an engineer who first worked for the Egyptian army and then for the civil institutions. He was a graduate of the Khidiwiyya high school in Cairo. He was trained as a lawyer at the French law school in Cairo and at the Toulouse School of Law in France. In January 1893, as a university student Kamil first became famous when he led a group of students who destroyed the offices of the newspaper Al Muqattam which supported the British occupation of Egypt. As a passionate nationalist, he supported Egypt's khedive, Abbas Hilmi II, who strongly opposed the British occupation. A protegee of Abbas Hilmi, whom he first met in 1892, it was the khedive who paid for Kamil to be educated in Toulouse. The American historian Michael Laffan described Kamil as "...a spellbinding orator, tireless traveller, prolific writer and charismatic personality". Kamil befriended the French Orientalist François Deloncle who promised to introduce him to French politicians, but instead gave him the job as his secretary, causing him to quit in disgust.

In October 1905, Kamil and a group of his associates helped establish the Higher Schools Students' Club in Cairo.Omar Lotfy Bey, one of Kamil's close friends, was elected as the club's first president in December 1905. The club became an important gathering place for Egyptian students and nationalist activists.

== Francophile ==
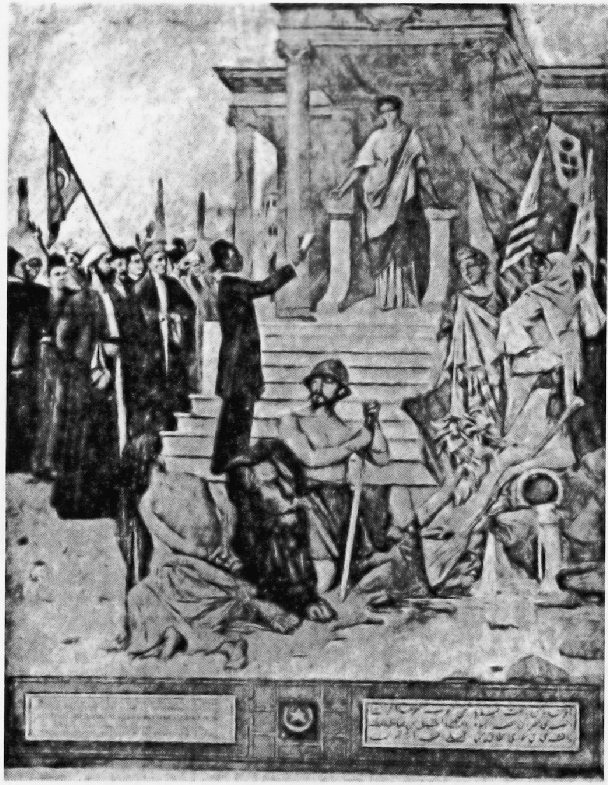
The poster printed by Kamil

Kamil first came to widespread attention outside Egypt when he presented a petition to the French Chamber of Deputies in Paris in June 1895 asking the French government to pressure Britain to leave Egypt. Kamil at the same time paid for a poster to be printed which shows him presenting a petition to Marianne in the "Temple of Reason" asking her to free Egypt, with the miserable-looking Egyptian masses standing behind him while the British lion together with a British soldier hold a half-naked woman symbolizing Egypt in chains. To the right of Marianne stand Uncle Sam and other symbolic characters for the other nations of the world, who were all standing upright and look happy, showing what Kamil hopes that Marianne will make Egypt like. Kamil's poster with its symbolic representation of Egypt's status was very popular, and was reprinted in many European and American newspapers in 1895. In a speech delivered in French in Toulouse on 4 July 1895, Kamil accused Lord Cromer of "purposively appointing incapable, indifferent or traitorous men at the head of Egyptian government ministries and other administrative positions. In this manner he not only manipulates these men like an instrument under his control but he uses the incompetence of these men to attempt and prove to Europe that our country lacks a governing managerial class." In the same speech, Kamil called for French help, saying: "Yes gentlemen, it is France's duty..to interfere and save us...France which has generously awakened Egypt from its profound sleep and has always treated us like its dearest offspring, earning in the process our eternal respect, emanating from the depths of our hearts and souls."

Upon returning to Egypt, Kamil wrote and published a pamphlet in French (the language of Egypt's elite) whose title Le peril anglais: Conséquence de l'occupation de l'Egypte par l'Angleterre gave away its thesis. From 1895 to 1907, Kamil visited France every year, always giving speeches and writing newspaper articles criticizing British rule in Egypt. Kamil's friendship with the French writer Pierre Loti and the feminist Juliette Adam led to him being introduced to much of the French intelligentsia, who were impressed by the charismatic and intelligent young Egyptian who spoke and wrote fluent French. However, Kamil's Francophile rhetoric was calculated as he told Abbas Hilmis's secretary in a letter in September 1895: "Like any realistic person knows, nations only cater to their best interests. The French, just like the English; regardless of how they pretend to be loyal to us, will do whatever is in their best political interests. Therefore through our rapprochement and our amicability toward them we are merely employing a purposeful political maneuver to gain their trust and perhaps, even if it is temporary, we can benefit from them politically." Kamil sometimes exaggerated the Francophilia of Egypt to win French support, as in a speech in Paris on 18 June 1899 when he said: "The war which your neighbors from across the English-Channel have been waging against your cultural influence and prestige on the banks of the Nile is without a name. English hate has especially targeted the French Language, for they have been zealously and tirelessly attempting to replace their language for yours." Despite Kamil's claims, French remained one of the official languages of Egypt until the 1952 revolution.

He also sought co-operation with France and the Ottoman Empire, but later he gradually grew more independent of outside backers, and appealed mainly to the Egyptian people to demand the end of the British occupation. Kamil often worked as an unofficial diplomat, touring the capitals of Europe on behalf of the Khedive, seeking support to end the British occupation of Egypt.

== Ideology ==
Kamil had what was described as a "complicated loyalties" owing to Egypt's status as an Ottoman vilayet (province) that was self-governing under the descendants of Mohammad Ali of Egypt that had been occupied by Britain in 1882. Like most Egyptians of his generation, Kamil saw the Khedives as the legitimate rulers of Egypt, who in turn owned their loyalty to the Ottoman Sultan-Caliph in Constantinople. He also called on Khedive Abbas II to grant constitutional government to his subjects. Realizing that Egypt could not expel the British by force, Kamil confided his efforts to public relations, writing: "The wise among the British have realized the danger of their occupation of Egypt. What they need to know is the true feelings of the Egyptian nation, its fears, hopes, and the truth. This would force their government to evacuate the Nile Valley. The best thing that we Egyptians can do now is to advertise the truth to Europe with as many languages as possible, especially in English and French."

In 1900, Kamil founded the newspaper Al Liwa' ("The Standard") as a platform for his views and utilized his skill as both a journalist and lawyer. He also founded a boys' school open to Egyptian Muslims, Christians, and Jews. A Francophile, Kamil was much influenced by French republican values of Liberté, Égalité, Fraternité, seeing France as the embodiment of the values of progress, prosperity, and freedom. Kamil's writing help to redefine loyalty to al-watan ("the homeland") in terms stressing the importance of education, nizam (order), and love of al-watan, implicitly criticizing the state created by Mohammad Ali the Great, which was run on militarist lines. Like many other Egyptian nationalists of the early 20th century, Kamil took pride in the achievements of the ancient Egyptian civilization, which for him showed that Egypt had a history of statehood going back thousands of years, which set the Egyptians apart from other peoples.

Greatly influenced by the French philosopher Ernest Renan who argued that what defined a nation was "Le désir d'être ensemble" ("a will to live together"), Kamil maintained that the Egyptians had for millennia had wanted to live together in a single state. Kamil's argument that the unification of Upper and Lower Egypt around about 3100 BC was the birth of Egypt as a state based his sense of Egyptian nationalism on loyalty to Egypt as a state and geographic entity, and contradicted the standard Islamic teaching that all of Egypt's history prior to the Muslim conquest of 639-642 AD was a period of jahiliyyah ("barbarous ignorance"). Like many other Egyptian nationalists of the 19th century, Kamil took great pride in the discoveries of archaeologists who uncovered the ruins of ancient Egypt, and he presented Egyptian history from the time of the Pharaohs to the present as one that all Egyptians should be proud of. Somewhat misunderstanding Mohammad Ali the Great's intentions, Kamil claimed that Mohammad Ali had only restored Egypt back to its status as a great power, which originated with the days of the Pharaohs. Proud of his fallah (peasant) origins, Kamil saw himself as an Egyptian first and a subject of the Ottoman empire a distant second. Kamil's position on the role of Islam in Egyptian life was quite elastic as at various times depending on his audience he asserted that Islam was the cornerstone of Egyptian national identity and at other times asserted that it was love of al-watan which defined being Egyptian, a position that implicitly accepted the Copts and Egyptian Jews as equals of the Muslims. Kamil tended to see Egyptian wataniya (patriotism) as being boosted by Islam instead of being based on Islam. Through Kamil was not willing to reject publicly the pan-Islamic message of the Ottoman Sultan Abdul Hamid II aka "Abdul Hamid the Damned", his writings tended to imply that the Muslims of the Egyptian al-watan had more in common with each other than they did with Muslims from other lands, and Islam was presented by him more as a means for unifying the Egyptian people than the end. Kamil supported Abdul Hamid's pan-Islamic campaign as the best way of bringing the Ottoman empire onto Egypt's side, hoping that the Sultan might persuade the British to leave Egypt, but he did not want Egypt to be occupied by the Ottomans again.

== Relations with Britain ==
Lord Cromer usually described Kamil in his dispatches to London as "the incapable nationalist demagogue", and in one dispatch described a conversation with a nationalist Egyptian intellectual who was almost certainly Kamil:

"I had to explain to the young Gallicised Egyptian that the principles of an ultra Republican Government were not applicable in their entirety to the existing phase of Egyptian society, and that, when we speak of the rights of man, some distinction has necessarily to be made in practice between a European sprouting nonsense through the medium of a fifth-rate newspaper in his own country, and man in the person of a ragged Egyptian fellah [peasant], possessed of a sole garment, and who is unable to read a newspaper in any language whatsoever."

Kamil disagreed passionately with Lord Cromer's frequent claims that "Orientals" did not have the same capacity for reason that the Europeans did, and much of his writings were concerned with showing that the Egyptians did have the capacity for reason and intelligent thought. Kamil also assailed Cromer in a speech for trying "to bring an end to French influence, which is still very extensive and overly dominant." Kamil charged that the Egyptian educational system was once the place of "loyal and scholarly, Egyptians and French teachers, is now the meeting place of the most ignorant and the most egotistical British adventurers...The British are trying to create for our children a purely gallophobe and anglophile school. You would not believe the lessons of hate given daily against France and Turkey." Kamil frequently excoriated Cromer for neglecting the Egyptian educational system, charging if he had been concerned with educating every Egyptian instead of paying off the debts run up by Ismail the Magnificent by exploiting Egypt, then he would have seen that the Egyptians did have the capacity for reason that he denied that they possessed. In a speech to the Société de Géographie de Paris, Kamil protested that insinuations that "Egyptians are not fit to govern their own country is a calumny, which any reasonable person must refute." When writing for European, usually French audiences, Kamil often attacked Cromer's claim that the average Egyptian Muslim was a bloodthirsty "fanatic" looking for any chance to murder Christians. In one newspaper article, Kamil wrote:

"the English committed an injustice after an injustice, but they have convinced Europe that we are a fanatic people, hostile to all Christians. This is the biggest of all lies! We are not fanatics, or hostile to Christians. We are a wise and hospitable people and the proof is incontestable... For the last century, we were in direct contact with Europe and especially France, and we were never hostile to anyone. On the contrary, the entire world finds in Egypt the most generous hospitality. If our enemies claim that we are religious fanatics, it is time to put an end to their legendary deceits."

Kamil tended to portray relations between the Muslim majority and the Coptic Christian minority in Egypt as ideal, arguing Egypt was a tolerant nation and not at all like Lord Cromer's picture of a "fanatical" Muslim nation that trampled down the Copts. To counter Cromer's "fanaticism" argument, Kamil coined the slogan "Libre chez nous, hospitaliers pour tous" ("Free in our country, hospitable to all"), which become his motto.

Much of Kamil's writings anticipated later Third World nationalism as he gave extensive coverage in Al-Liwa to independence movements in India (modern India, Pakistan, and Bangladesh) and the Netherlands East Indies (modern Indonesia), suggesting that independence activists in both places shared a common predicament with people like himself, as all were members of an oppressed "East" dominated by the West. In 1900, Kamil who had hoped that France might intervene in the Boer War on behalf of the Transvaal Republic and the Orange Free State wrote: "What a lesson for us who counted on Europe!"

== The Rising Sun ==
After the Entente Cordial of 1904 and the Russian-Japanese war of 1904-05, Kamil became an ardent Japanophile, praising the Japanese as an "Eastern" people who had modernized and as a role model for Egypt. Under the terms of the Entente Cordial, France recognized Egypt as being in the British sphere of influence in exchange for which Britain recognized Morocco in the French sphere of influence. Kamil gave the Russo-Japanese War extensive coverage in Al-Liwa' and praised the Japanese for having modernized without losing their Japanese identity. Viewing the Ottoman Sultan Abdul Hamid II as a reformer, at the same time, Kamil constantly covered reforming efforts in the Ottoman Empire and expressed the hope that Abdul Hamid would be a great reformer like the Meiji Emperor of Japan. Much of Kamil's writings in Al-Liwa urged Abdul Hamid to be more like the Meiji Emperor in giving the Ottoman empire "vigor" in embracing modernizing reforms. On 28 March 1904, Kamil wrote to a French friend, Juliette Adam, that he was writing a book on Japan "so as to explain to the people how to rise, and to encourage them by the current striving of the Japanese". In June 1904, Kamil wrote to Adam that he had finished his book on Japan, saying: "I have just finished the first volume of my book on Japan. The chief reason which has pushed me to do it is to profit by the current of great sympathy that my compatriots have for the Japanese to tell them that those people are so strong only because they are patriotic. I believe that it will have a ringing effect. I have never tired myself so much as these last days".

In his 1904 book The Rising Sun, Kamil wrote:

"If the Europeans had been genuine in their propaganda and speech that they wanted to civilize all human kind and that they did not enter countries except to take their people into their hands to mobilise them on the path to civilisation, then they would have been pleased in their anticipation of the progress of the yellow race and its development and reckoned Japan the greatest of civilised factors. However the truth and reality is that rivalry remains the general rule in mankind. It is ordained that everyone works for the disappointment and disadvantage of his opponent. The Europeans do not wish for the advancement of the Orientals and the Orientals do not desire the permanence of European sovereignty".

In another article in September 1904, Kamil wrote that the Japanese victories against Russia were "a glory for every Easterner". When Kamil learned that his French friend Pierre Loti who was supporting Russia against Japan had ended their friendship over the issue, a disappointed Kamil wrote to Adam on 9 June 1905:

"I am extremely sorry to learn that Loti has changed towards me... If I have spoken of my enthusiasm for Japan before him, it is that I cannot hide my opinion and my sentiments;... You are astonished that I am for the Japanese; all my people agree with me. Pray examine the thing from the Egyptian and Mussulman [Muslim] point of view. Of the two combatants, Japan has done no harm to Egypt nor to Islam; on the other hand Russia has done to Egypt, at the time of its greatness under Mehmet Ali [Mohammad Ali the Great], the greatest evil in burning its fleet, in concert with England, always treacherous, and France, always deceived [Kamil was referring to the 1827 Battle of Navarino when a Anglo-Franco-Russian fleet destroyed the Ottoman-Egyptian fleet off the coast of Greece]. And in giving to Mehmet Ali the most serious opposition, she has done to Islam and the Mussulman peoples the blackest of evils. She is enemy No. 1 [sic]. In the second place, it is not the alliance of England with Japan which ruins the independence of my country but the entente of treacherous England with France. Why then should I be anti-Japanese? I, who adore the patriots [sic] and find amongst the Japanese the finest example of patriotism? The Japanese people is not the sole Oriental people which has put Europe in its proper place. How should I not love them? I understand very well your grief and chagrin, you who have prepared the Russian alliance for other ends. But I would have shared this grief and chagrin if France had remained for us France".

Much of The Rising Sun is concerned with the Meiji Restoration with the Meiji Emperor cast a hero who had modernized Japan by ending the Tokugawa bakufu, which an Egyptian audience understood as a call for the Khedive Abbas II to modernize Egypt by ending the British occupation. The message was made explicit when Kamil compared the late Tokugawa bakufu, unable to stand up to foreign powers who pushed Japan around, with the present state of Islamic world, likewise unable to stand up to foreigners, and expressed the hope that both Abdul Hamid II and Abbas II would be able to emulate the Meiji Emperor.

=== Description of Japan ===
Reflecting his view of Islam, in The Rising Sun, Kamil presented Shinto simply as a means for the Japanese state to unify the Japanese people around a common loyalty to the Emperor rather than a faith in its own right. Kamil wrote he did not believe that the Emperors of Japan were gods, but he felt having the Japanese people worship their emperor as a living god was very useful towards uniting the Japanese people as one, arguing that the Japanese were never divided in the way that the Egyptians were because almost all Japanese regarded their emperor as a god who could not be disobeyed. Kamil did not understand the distinction between State Shinto which gloried the Emperors of Japan as living gods vs. folk Shinto which had existed in Japan for thousands of years, seeing all Shinto as State Shinto. The Japanese always used the term Mikado ("high gate") to refer to the Emperor as his title and name were considered to be too sacred to be uttered by ordinary people, and Kamil did not understand the term Mikado was only a metonym for the Japanese monarchy. Kamil wrote that it was terrible for Shinto to decline as Shinto had "glorified the Mikado's forefathers and ancestors and respected the sacred Japanese origin, was scorned by the daimyo and was replaced by Buddhism and Confucianism to kill indigenous sentiments and wipe out patriotic affection in the soul". Kamil wrote with admiration how State Shinto unified the Japanese people into one, declaring: "The spirit of change and national pride crept among all [the Japanese], after which the individual who had believed that his village was the whole country began to realise that the entire kingdom was a country for everyone; and that no matter how remote its parts or isolated its regions, any foreign intervention in the meanest of its villages would disturb its peace and likewise hurt them".

Kamil praised the Meiji reforms for giving Japan a legal system based on the French legal system that made all Japanese equal before the law and a constitution, both reforms which he implied that the Khedive should emulate in Egypt. The chapter in The Rising Sun praising the bakufu in the 16th and 17th centuries for stamping out Christianity in Japan as Christianity was a "foreign faith" that undermined the unity of the Japanese people frightened Egypt's Coptic minority. In the same way, Kamil praised those samurai who had "restored" the Meiji emperor in 1867, even through the reforms of the Meiji era ended the special status and way of life of the samurai, as patriots who put the greater good of Japan ahead of their own interests. Kamil's message was that the Egyptian Turco-Circassian aristocracy needed to be more like the Japanese elite in pursuing reforms that would end their special status for the greater good of Egypt. What attracted Kamil the most to the Japanese system was its authoritarianism as he wrote approving how the Japanese people worshiped their emperor as a living god and untiringly sought to unconditionally obey his commands, even unto death, which he regarded as the key to how Japan had successfully modernized. At the same time, Kamil who had never visited Japan himself, painted Japanese society in a very rosy light, declaring that Japan did not have censorship, its French-style legal system treated everyone as an equal, and the Japanese state ensured universal education for all, with the obvious inference that Egypt would benefit if only it were more like Japan.

=== Critique ===
Kamil presented Japanese imperialism in a favorable light, arguing the Japanese, unlike the British (who Kamil claimed were only interesting in economically exploiting their colonies) were practicing in Korea an Asian version of the French mission civilisatrice ("civilizing mission"), arguing that the Japanese only conquered other people's countries to improve the lot of the ordinary people. Kamil in The Rising Sun drew a contrast between the "evil" of the Russian empire, "enriched by every colonialism" vs. the "rightful" anger of the Japanese at being "cheated" out of their conquests from the First Sino-Japanese war in 1894-95. Laffan wrote Kamil seemed to have taken it for granted that Japan's imperialistic policies towards Korea and China were justified, and noted that he never seems to have considered the viewpoint that the Koreans and the Chinese resented being under Japanese control in the same way that he resented Egypt being under the control of Great Britain. He also noted that Kamil would have been dismayed to learn that the model for Japanese rule of Korea during the years 1905-10 when Korea was a Japanese protectorate was Lord Cromer's administration of Egypt, as the Japanese saw Cromer's "veiled protectorate" of Egypt a perfect example of what they were seeking to do in Korea.

== Sudan ==
Despite his anti-imperialist views towards the British occupation, Kamil held imperialist views towards the Sudan, writing that Egypt was the rightful ruler of the Sudan "by right of conquest" and stated he could never accept the view that the Sudan should be independent of Egypt. Like many Egyptians of his generation, Kamil believed that Egypt had the right to control the sources of both the Blue Nile and White Nile. Kamil also held racist views towards people in sub-Saharan Africa, writing about his belief that Black people were inferior to Egyptians and expressed his approval for the attempt of Ismail the Magnificent to expand Egypt's empire in the Sudan by trying to conquer the Great Lakes region of Africa and Ethiopia. In his writings, Kamil expressed anger at the British for, in his view, lumping the Egyptians in with the population of sub-Saharan Africa, instead of giving them separate treatment.

== Denshawai incident ==
Kamil's cause was strengthened by the Denshawai incident on 13 June 1906 in which four peasants were hastily tried and hanged for having assaulted British Army officers who were hunting pigeons in their village. The Denshawai incident galvanized the Egyptian nationalist movement, and Kamil used the case of an Egyptian farmer being killed by British troops after he attempted to help a British officer who died of sunstroke together with the hanging of four Egyptian farmers for supposedly instigating the alleged murder of the officer to rouse nationalist anger, becoming the spokesman of the Egyptian nationalist movement. In an article in Le Figaro on 11 July 1906, Kamil wrote: "A tragic affair took place in the Egyptian delta village of Dinshaway, which has managed to emotionally touch humanity in its entirety." Kamil's article in Le Figaro first brought international attention to the Denshawai incident, and on 15 July 1906, Kamil visited London. Kamil translated his article into English and mailed it to every member of Parliament, where giving speeches all over Britain recounting the Denshawai affair.

On 26 July 1906 Kamil gave a speech at the Carlton Hotel in London, which began with highlighting the history of the Coptic minority in Egypt to counter Cromer's "fanaticism" argument before attacking Cromer for his neglect of the Egyptian educational system, charging that entire generations of Egyptians had gone uneducated since he had taken charge of the Egyptian finances. Kamil then turned to the Denshawai incident, saying: "Lord Cromer established this special tribunal in Dinshaway which has revolted everyone . . . a tribunal which follows no legal code and no laws. . . . Its existence was an outrage against the humanity and civil rights of the Egyptian people and a blemish on the honor of British civilization.". Afterwards, Kamil visited 10 Downing Street to meet the Prime Minister, Henry Campbell-Bannerman. Campbell-Bannermann asked Kamil for a list of Egyptians capable of being ministers, leading him to write down 32 names, several of whom were appointed to the Egyptian cabinet. The Denshawai incident led to Lord Cromer's resignation in March 1907, and in his resignation letter, Cromer for the first time referred to Kamil by name, writing: "If I were younger I should rather enjoy fighting the Khedive, Mustafa Kamil and their English allies, and moreover, I think I should beat them".

He was supported strongly by Mohammad Farid, a prominent member of Egypt and Sudan's aristocracy. With Farid's assistance, Kamil founded the National Party in December 1907, two months before his death.

== Death and legacy ==
His funeral was the occasion for a massive demonstration of popular grief, being attended by hundreds of thousands who saw Kamil as their champion. Mohammad Farid, who spent his last penny supporting the country's national liberation movement, became the leader of the National Party after Kamil's death.

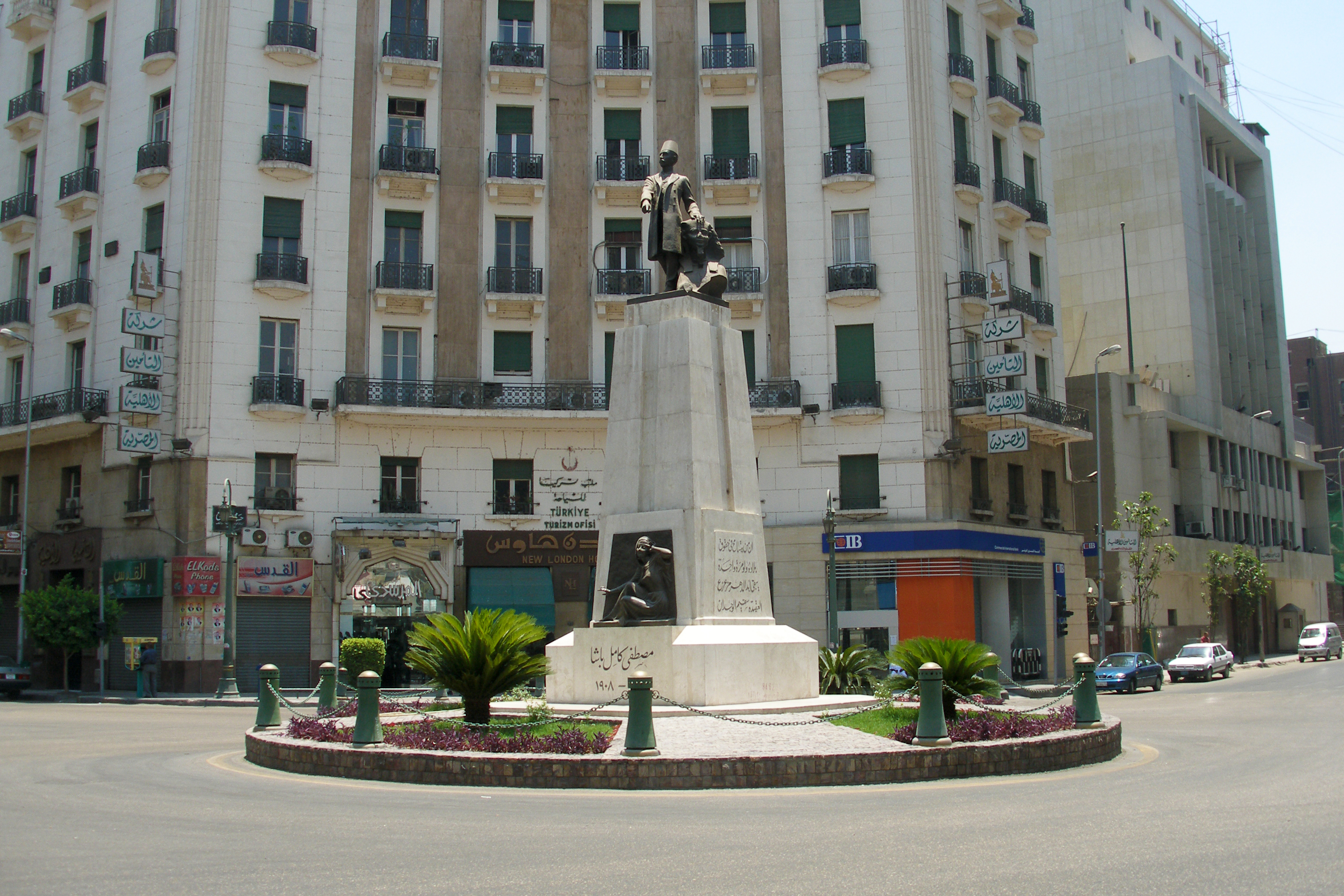
Mostafa Kamel Square in Downtown Cairo

Mustafa Kamil's mausoleum (built between 1949–53 in neo-Mamluk style), close to Cairo's Citadel, is open to the public as a museum: the Mostafa Kamel Museum. It holds in a side room a display of memorabilia related to him.

Fazlur Rahman Malik argues that even though he was necessarily secular, his nationalism was inspired by an Islamic past. This appears to be the natural conclusion as Egypt had remained under the Islamic Caliphate system for centuries before. The British often accused him of advocating pan-Islamism, and it is well known that he supported the Ottoman Sultan against the Egyptian Government and the British authorities in Egypt in the dispute over Taba in May 1906, even though later in his life he moved away from supporting Egypt as a part of an all-encompassing Islamic world, and more as a unique territorial entity.

Kamil is remembered as a fervent Egyptian nationalist, and an articulate advocate of Egyptian independence. The current Egyptian national anthem (Bilady, Bilady, Bilady) is thought to have been inspired by one of Mustafa Kamil's speeches:

"If I weren't an Egyptian, I would have wished to be an Egyptian."

— Mustafa Kamil

== Gallery ==
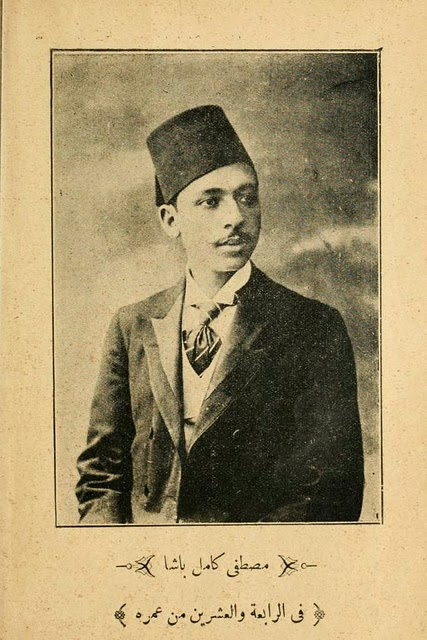
When he was 24 years old

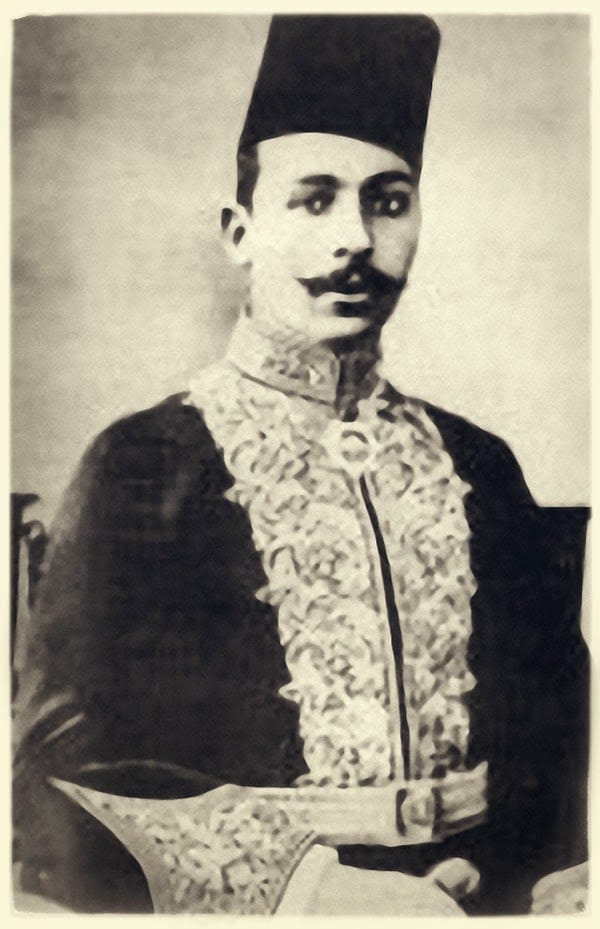
Mustafa Kamil with his official dress

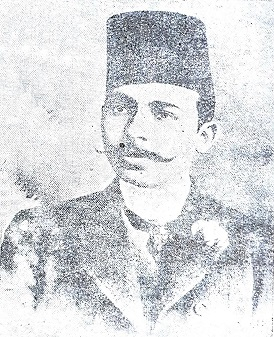

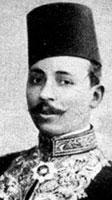

== Bibliography ==
- "Kamil, Mustafa". Encyclopædia Britannica (Online ed.). 5 October 2005.
- Cleveland, William L. (2013). A History of the Modern Middle East. Westview Press.
- Fahmy, Ziad (2008). "Francophone Egyptian Nationalists, Anti-British Discourse, and European Public Opinion, 1885-1910: The Case of Mustafa Kamil and Ya'qub Sannu'". Comparative Studies of South Asia, Africa and the Middle East. 28 (1): 170–183. doi:10.1215/1089201x-2007-063.
- Goldschmidt, Arthur Jr. (2000). Biographical Dictionary of Modern Egypt. Boulder: Lynne Rienner. pp. 101–103.
- Laffan, Michael (1999). "Mustafa and the Mikado: A Francophile Egyptian's turn to Meiji Japan". Japanese Studies. 19 (3): 269–286. doi:10.1080/10371399908727682.
- Rahman Malik, Fazlur (1984). Islam & Modernity. University Of Chicago Press. ISBN 978-0-226-70284-1.
- Steppat, Fritz (1956). "Nationalismus und Islam bei Mustafa Kamil: Ein Beitrag zur Ideengeschichte der ägyptischen Nationalbewegung". Die Welt des Islams (in German). 4 (4). Leiden: Brill: 242–341.
- Williams, Caroline (2008). Islamic Monuments in Cairo. AUC Press.
