= Mohammad Farid =

Egyptian politician

- محمد فريد
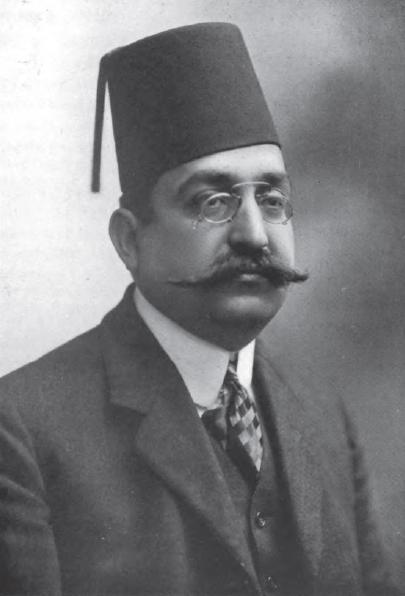
- Muhammad Farîd
- Born: January 20, 1868; Cairo, Egypt
- Died: November 15, 1919 (aged 51); Berlin, Germany
- Occupation: politician
- Political party: National Party

Mohammad Farid (or Muhammad Farîd; Arabic: محمد فريد; January 20, 1868 in Cairo – November 15, 1919 in Berlin) was an influential Egyptian political figure. He was a nationalist leader, writer, and lawyer.

== Early life ==
Farid was born to an Egyptian Upper class family with distant Turkish descent and strong ties to Muhammad Ali Pasha. Farid was the son of the director of el-Da'irah el-Saniyya (Royal state domains administration) and belonged to a landowning family. He attended the Khalil Agha School, the Ecole des Freres, and the School of Administration. He worked as a lawyer for the Egyptian government and for the Parquet (office of the attorney general).

== Political life ==
He was dismissed for backing Shaykh Ali Yusuf, a popular Egyptian newspaper editor who was tried for publishing secret telegrams taken from the War Ministry. Farid proceeded to open his own law office.

Farid was the main political and financial supporter of Mustafa Kamil, the founder of the Egyptian National Party, and after his premature death in 1908, was elected second president of that party. He led the party in Egypt until March 1912 and then in exile until his death.

He argued that the British must withdraw their army of occupation from Egypt and that only Egypt's monarch, the khedive, could grant a constitution to the Egyptians. He called for the spread of education and advocated social and economic reforms, especially to benefit workers. At times he sought help from the Ottoman Empire (to which the Egyptian khedivate still owed technical fealty), notably while in exile during World War I, but he also suspected the Turks of undermining Egyptian national aims. Farid's occasional support for pan-Islam alienated Egyptian Copts.

== Legacy ==
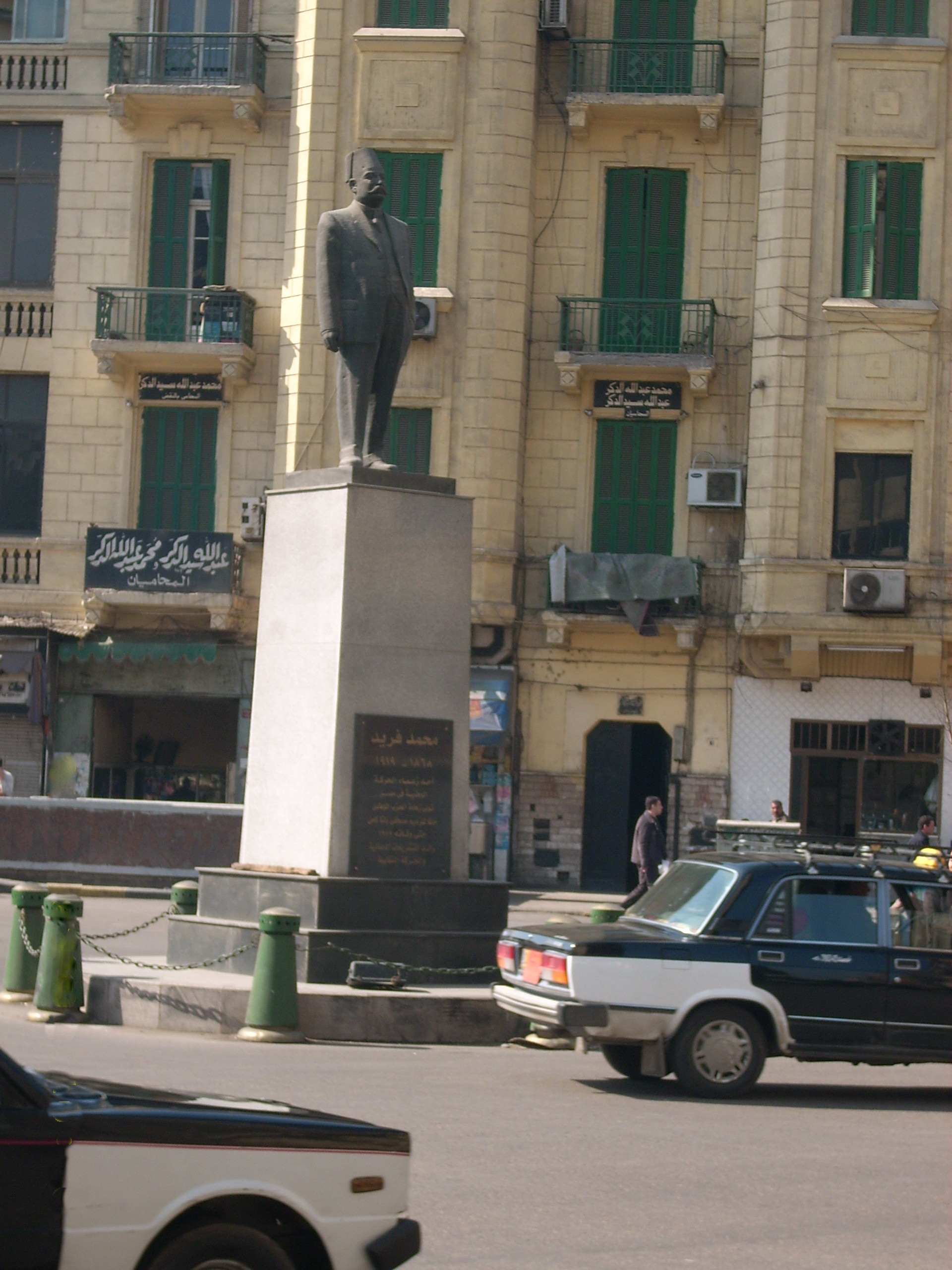
Mohammed Farid Statue - Abdeen - Cairo

Among Egyptians today, Farid is respected for his nationalism, courage, and self-sacrifice. His memoirs have been published in Arabic, and partly in English translation. He also wrote histories of the Muhammad Ali Dynasty, the Roman Empire, and the Ottoman Empire, as well as travel diaries, and numerous articles for local nationalist newspapers.

Historian Fawaz Gerges identifies Farid as exemplifying "the emergence of a politics of exile as a means to sustain the struggle against British colonialism."
