= 1946 Egyptian protests =

Wave of demonstrations and strikes in post-war Egypt

1946 protests in Egypt
- Date: February 9, 1946 – March 4, 1946
- Location: Egypt
- Caused by: Egyptian nationalism
- Goals: Removal of British troops in Egypt
- Result: Removal of all British forces to the Suez Canal; Resumption of Anglo-Egyptian negotiations

Parties
Wafd Party	British Government
Muslim Brotherhood (Note: Participated in the march after the Abbas Bridge incident on 9 February and in another march on the 11th. al-Banna was against the brothers joining in on the 21 February march, though many did participate. Following the 4 March rally, the Brotherhood withdrew all support for the strikes.)	Egyptian government
Young Egypt Party
DMNL
Numerous student and worker organizations

Lead figures
Fouad Serageddin Henri Curiel Salama Moussa Ahmed Hussein	King Farouk Mahmoud El Nokrashy Ismail Sidky

Casualties
- Deaths: Around 30
- Injuries: Hundreds

In early 1946, protests by students and workers erupted throughout Egypt. Motivated by Egyptian nationalism and anti-colonialism, they resulted in the retreat of British troops in Egypt from the main delta to the Suez Canal. The protests are most known for the Abbas Bridge Incident, where protesters were thrown into the River Nile after the police raised the sides of a drawbridge. They resulted in the resignation of prime minister Mahmoud el Nokrashy and a draft treaty between Egyptian prime minister Ismail Sidky and British foreign minister Ernest Bevin, though the failure of this draft led to Sidky's resignation later on that year.

== Historical Context ==
British control of Egypt was firmly established following the 1882 Anglo-Egyptian War. After the 1919 Egyptian revolution, a delegation - Wafd in Arabic - of Egyptian nationalists formed to negotiate with the British government over the question of Egyptian independence. This began a decades long political struggle between Egyptian nationalists and British officials, specifically over the issues of British troop presence and the status of the Suez Canal and Sudan. During the interwar period, mainstream Egyptian politics was divided between the British, the conservative monarchy, the Wafd party. In 1936, the British and Egyptian governments signed the Anglo-Egyptian Treaty. The treaty raised the number of British forces in the canal from 8,000 to 10,000, authorized British troops in and near Alexandria for eight years as well other provisions further legitimizing British military and political control in Egypt. While the Wafd party did believe in Egyptian nationalism, it was also fiercely against fascism, leading to a brief British-Wafd alliance during World War II. This culminated in the 1942 Abdeen Palace Incident, when British forces nearly overthrew King Farouk unless he appointed the leader of the Wafd, Mustafa al-Nahhas, prime minister. This incident greatly damaged the Wafd's credibility among the Egyptian masses. Nahhas would govern the country until his dismissal in 1944, when the Axis threat to Egypt was no longer present. The Wafd boycotted the 1945 Egyptian parliamentary election, leading to a victory of minor opposition parties. The new prime minister Ahmed Maher brought Egypt into the war on 24 February 1945 in order to give Egypt a seat at the post-war peace conference. He was assassinated by a fanatic Egyptian nationalist for this supposed 'capitulation to British pressure'.

While mainstream Egyptian politics was dominated by the political wrestling match between King Farouk and the Wafd party, they were not the only players on the scene. Though the Wafd party was the most popular, the king could rely on support from anti-Wafd opposition parties, such as the new prime minister Mahmoud El Nokrashy's Saadist Institutional Party and Ismail Sidky's 'People's Party'. Further to the right were the Islamist Hasan al-Banna's Muslim Brotherhood and nationalist Ahmed Hussein's Young Egypt. While these parties never officially had any seats in parliament, they could marshal support from the rural masses and nationalist urban middle class. On the left were numerous socialists organizations. The first Egyptian Communist Party was crushed by the Wafd in 1924, yet by the end of World War II, Egyptian leftists came back under the banner of Henri Curiel's DMNL, Hillel Schwartz's Iskra and Fu'ad Morsi's new Egyptian Communist Party. Inside the Wafd, a left wing faction called the 'Wafdist Vanguard' faction emerged. The Wafdist old guard was dealt a severe blow following the departure of Makram Ebied in 1943. Ebied created the splinter party 'the Wafdist Bloc', and after exposing al-Nahhas' corruption in his Black Book, joined el Nokrashy's cabinet. The end of the war in 1945 also meant an end to martial law, making way for these forces to fight for the future Egypt.

The Wafd sought to unseat prime minister Mahmoud el Nokrashy's government by organizing student demonstrations at the start of the 1945/46 school year. In August 1945, the Wafdist Fouad Serageddin along with Hasan al-Banna and Ahmed Hussein created the 'Preparatory Committee of the National Committee of Students'. This organization had representatives from both rightist and leftist students as well as contacts in the trade unions. The government sought to weaken the committee by flipping Hasan al-Banna. After a meeting with Ali Maher, al-Banna urged his followers against demonstrations. While some joined the left, the majority followed his advice. On October 6th, al-Banna received enough funds from the Interior Ministry to set up headquarters in Cairo. On the same day, thousands of students demonstrated against the British, while the Brotherhood urged students not to join them. On the next day, students called for a general conference to renew Anglo-Egyptian negotiations and establishing National Committees in universities throughout the country. On the campus of Cairo University, they adopted three resolutions:

1. "The struggle for national independence is not only a struggle against military occupation, but is also a struggle against colonial domination of economic, political and cultural aspects of Egyptian society."
2. "Local oligarchs are the local partners of the colonial power and should accordingly be treated as enemies of Egypt."
3. "The only way to fight colonialism is a unified front between all anti-colonial powers"

The Brotherhood created their own memorandum instead to be submitted to the government. This split led to a shuffling of the organization; with the departure of the Brotherhood the committee renamed itself to 'The Higher Executive Committee of the Students'. el Nokrashy exploited the political divisions between the Wafd and the Brotherhood to protect his government. During the Balfour Day riots on 2 November, he instructed the police not use firearms against the looters. These riots indicated that al-Banna did not have full control over his movement, as the rioters clashed with police despite his orders. The student movement was briefly weakened due to infighting between the Brotherhood and Young Egypt, who was now aligned with the leftist Wafdists. Around the same time, a strike in Shubra El Kheima gave the government an opportunity to arrest communists in the first week of January 1946.

The 1936 treaty was signed in the lead up period of World War II. Egyptian nationalists questioned as to whether it was appropriate for the post-war geopolitical circumstances. They argued that the values laid out in the Atlantic Charter and the Declaration by the United Nations laid the legal foundations of complete Egyptian independence. Under intense pressure from Egyptian nationalists, prime minister Mahmoud el Nokrashy sent a note the British government on 20 December 1945, stating the end of the war had rendered British troop presence in Egypt pointless and harmful to relations between Egypt and Britain. The British government responded on 26 January 1946, agreeing to a review of the treaty but not intending to remove Egypt from its sphere of influence. This reply caused an explosion of nationalist anger, with the old nationalist cry of 'No Negotiation Except After Evacuation!" returning to the street. Students from al-Azhar went on hunger strike. The Young Muslim Men's Association held a meeting at its headquarters to organize a march on 9 February. The plan was to submit a memorandum to the palace calling for breaking negotiations, revocation of the 1936 treaty and refusal for Egypt to sign a military agreement with Britain.

== Events ==
On 9 February 1946, six thousand students marched from Cairo University's Giza campus across the Abbas bridge in Cairo. The police tried to stop them by raising both halves of the bridge, which were then lowered by the students. When the demonstration continued, the police raised it again, throwing students into the Nile. (Note: The historian Abd al-Rahman al-Rafai claims that 84 were injured in the bridge incident but no one was killed.) For the next three days, students clashed with police. After a Sudanese student - Muhammad Ali Muhammad - was killed, the police battled students trying to hold a funeral at the Faculty of Medicine. In total, three students died and 170 were wounded. King Farouk was supposed to visit a ceremony for the opening of new dormitories on campus on 10 February, but found no students and ruined royal decorations. On 13 February, el Nokrashy resigned. King Farouk appointed Ismail Sidky prime minister on the 15th.

On the 17th, the student committees issued a national charter calling for the complete removal of British troops from Egyptian soil, the Egypt submitting its case to the UN Security Council and the country 'liberated from economic slavery'. On the next day, a meeting of students from Cairo University and al-Azhar met on the latter's campus to form the 'General Union of Students'. They then approached trade unionists and workers to form the National Committee of Workers and Students (NCWS). On the 21st, they called for a general strike, and were answered by another wave of protests. In Cairo, tens of thousands of students and workers marched to center of the capital; the police did not raise the bridge this time. When the leader of Young Egypt, Ahmed Hussein, tried to speak at this rally, he was shouted with cries of "Down with fascism!". Afterwards, they entered Ismailiya Square (Note: Now known as Tahrir Square) and confronted British troops. British machine gun fire killed twenty-three and injured 120. (Note: Erlich (1989) puts the figures at no less than 20 deaths and 150 wounded.) On 4 March, another violent clash occurred in Alexandria, when protesters pulled down a British flag and attacked a British position leading to more deaths and injuries. At Mahalla al-Kubra, 25 thousand workers at the Misr Spinning and Weaving Company went on strike.

The NCWS was neither sufficiently united politically nor deeply rooted enough among the Egyptian people to carry out simultaneously the tasks of mobilizing and leading both the national and workers’ movements. The political and organizational immaturity of the NCWS leadership prevented it from fully exploiting the enormous political opportunity before it.

— Beinin & Lockman, Workers on the Nile, pg 344

Student and Worker Committees, 1945/46
Name	Date Established
Preparatory Committee for the National Committee of Students	August 1945
National Committees of Students	7 Oct. 1945
Preparatory Committee for an Egyptian Trade Union Congress (Note: This was originally the Preparatory Committee for an Egyptian Trade Union Representative to the WFTU Congress founded in early August 1945. Its Arabic name is translated in (Abdalla 1985) as the Preparatory Committee for the Confederation of Egyptian Trade Unions. It is not to be confused with the Preparatory Committee for a General Federation of Egyptian Trade Unions, founded on 14 October 1951.)	29 Oct. 1945
Executive Committee of Students (Note: The standing committee of Wafdist students also had the same name.)	Dec. 1945
Higher Executive Committee of Students	Dec. 1945
Mixed Committee of Students	17 Feb. 1946
General Union of Students	18 Feb. 1946
National Committee of Workers and Students	17-19 Feb. 1946
Nationalist Committee of Students	28 Feb. 1946
Congress of Egyptian Trade Unions	1 May 1946

The main body of this movement was the National Committee of Workers and Students (NCWS). This body was composed of both communists and left Wafdists, trade unionists and students across Egypt. This was the organization that led the marches of 21 February and 4 March and lasted until July. It was criticized by the preparatory committee of Egyptian trade unions for being too centered around students. They believed that no decision should be taken without the consent of at least half of the worker members of the NCWS. The NCWS lacked any level of concrete organization, quickly burning out by July.

Ismail Sidky tried desperately to quell the demonstrators. He met with leading figures in the Muslim Brotherhood, including al-Banna, causing a break in the movement. The Nationalist Committee of Students was a right-wing government sponsored organization designed to fracture the movement from the leftists and Wafdists. They were mainly led by the Muslim Brotherhood and political actors from other groups such as the Liberal Constitutionalists, the Sa'adists and members of the National Party. (Note: Also included minor groups like the socialist 'Peasant Party', 'Egypt's Front', and the 'Partisan Arabs'.) Sidky appointed the minister of education as their government representative. This committee dissolved when the Muslim Brotherhood withdrew after refusing to criticize the government's ongoing negotiations with Britain.

== Aftermath ==
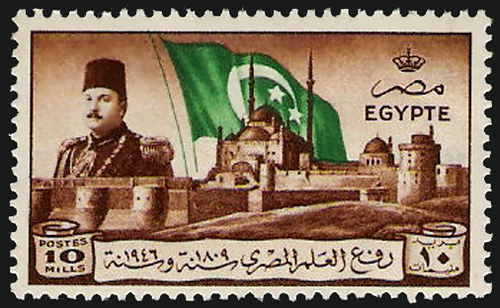
A stamp showing the Egyptian flag rising on the Cairo Citadel in honor of the British withdrawal.

The British ambassador, Sir Miles Lampson, was recalled on February 18, replaced by Sir Ronald Campbell. Prime minister Clement Attlee announced on 8 March 1946 the complete evacuation of British forces to the Suez Canal zone. During the summer break, Sidky ordered the arrests of two hundred leftists on 10 July, causing the dissolution of many groups and the closing of many magazines. Leftists such as Salama Musa and Muhammad Mandur were arrested. The National Committee of Workers and Students was banned.

The negotiations between the Egyptian and British government lasted from April to October. Sidky demanded as a pre-condition to the British negotiating team in Cairo the announcement of a complete withdrawal from Egypt. British Foreign Minister Ernest Bevin agreed, announcing in the House of Commons their intent to evacuate all troops "under the proper conditions". However, Bevin still insisted for Britain to maintain the right to reoccupy the bases in the event of war. In June, the Egyptians and British delegations came up with the idea of a "Joint Defense Board". This would be a committee made up of Egyptians and British representatives to determine whether or not the situation required British forces. While a step forward from the 1936 treaty, the opposition still opposed any defensive pact with Britain. This briefly brought the Wafd, Wafdist Bloc, and the Muslim Brotherhood together by September. Another wave of violent demonstrations in November led to even more injuries and deaths. The protesters were mostly Wafdist and leftist students fighting against Sidky and brotherhood; one common slogan was: "No Fascism—No Brotherhood—No Trafficking in Religion", leading to brawls between rival student clubs. After the failure of the Bevin-Sidky agreement, Sidky resigned on 9 December 1946.

Mahmoud el-Nokrashy returned to office, sending further notes to the British government and brought Egypt's case to the Security Council. After the return of the Wafd in the 1950 elections, al-Nahhas withdrew Egypt from the 1936 treaty. A small guerrilla war was fought by Egyptian nationalists, communists and Islamists on the Suez Canal against British control. While Egypt and Britain signed a treaty in 1954, the nationalization of the Suez Canal in 1956 sparked the Suez Crisis, resulting in the complete removal of British influence in Egypt.

== Timeline ==
- 7 October 1945: General student conference at Cairo University at the beginning of the 1945/46 school year ending with a petition imploring King Farouk to begin negotiations with Britain
- 20 December 1945: Prime minister Nokrashy sends an official diplomatic note to the British foreign secretary
- 5 January 1946: Amin Osman is assassinated
- 26 January 1946: British reply to the original note infuriates local Egyptians. Muslim Brotherhood students join the Higher Executive Committee, despite Brotherhood officials objections to working with the Wafd and leftists.
- 9 February 1946: Second semester begins. Six thousand students march across Abbas bridge while the police raise the edges, injuring 84 as students are thrown into the Nile. For the next three days, clashes leave three students dead and 170 wounded.
- 12 February 1946: Cairo university campus closes following a visit by King Farouk and further demonstrations.
- 13 February 1946: Nokrashy resigns. Ismail Sidky becomes prime minister shortly afterwards. (Note: Erlich (1988) puts this date on the 17th, while Abdalla (1985) puts it on the 15th.)
- 17 February 1946: Mixed Committee of Students is formed and issued a national charter, calling for the total evacuation of British forces from the land, water and air of the Nile valley, placing the Egyptian national question before the UN Security Council and the liberation of 'economic slavery'.
- 18 February 1946: General Union of Students is formed, as well as the National Committee of Workers and Students. The British ambassador is recalled.
- 21 February 1946: Tens of thousands in Cairo of demonstrators march and clash with British forces, killing between 20-23 and injuring 120-150.
- 4 March 1946: Another rally is held in Alexandria in honor of the victims of the previous march. A British military post is attacked, killing 2 British soldiers and 28 Egyptians and injuring 342.
- 7 March 1946: A royal decree from King Farouk is issued to ask prime minister Sidky to appoint an official delegation for negotiations with the British government. The delegation is headed by Sidky and includes Mohammed Hussein Heikal, Ahmed Lutfi el-Sayed, Ali Shamsi Pasha, Makram Ebeid, Hafez Afifi Pasha, Ibrahim Abdel Hady Pasha, Aly Maher, Abdel Fattah Yahya Pasha, Hussein Sirri Pasha, and Nokrashy.
- 8 March 1946: British Prime Minister Clement Attlee announced the evacuation of British forces from the Nile valley.
- 1 May 1946: Shots from students in Alexandria kill two policemen, leading to the university occupied by troops. The Congress of Egyptian Trade Unions is founded.
- 4 July 1946: British evacuation of the Cairo citadel.
- 13 July 1946: Seven people are injured and one is killed in a grenade attack on British military police.
- Summer 1946: Arrests and ban of Egyptian protest leaders and leftists.
- 25 October 1946: Sidky returns from London to Cairo with a draft treaty.
- 16 November 1946: Representatives of the Wafd, the Egyptian Students' Committee, Young Egypt, the Muslim Brotherhood, the Secondary Schools’ Union and the former office of the General Students’ Executive Committee join to create the National Front of All Students of the Nile Valley to support the complete evacuation of the British forces and a rejection of a military defense pact with Britain. Another wave of violence in the following weeks kill more students and injure hundreds.
- 24 November 1946: Six grenades are thrown and pistol shots are fired in Cairo. Three policemen, four soldiers and one army officer are injured.
- 25 November 1946: Medical students in Cairo set fire to two trams, trees and other items. 33 are wounded and three are killed from police gunfire.
- 2 December 1946: Hundreds of students in Asyut demonstrate and throw stones at police who open fire, kill three and injure thirty.
- 8 December 1946: Sidky resigns. Nokrashy replaces him as prime minister.

== Sources ==
- Abdalla, Ahmed (1985). "1946: The Climax". The Student Movement and National Politics in Egypt, 1923-1973. Al Saqi Books. ISBN 9780863561177.
- Abdel Ghafar, Adel (2017). Egyptians in Revolt: The Political Economy of Labor and Student Mobilizations 1919-2011. Routledge. ISBN 9781138656109.
- Abu Sarah, Christine-Marie (2024). Revolutionary Emotions in Cold War Egypt: Islam, Communism, and Anti-Colonial Protest. Bloomsbury Publishing.
- Beinin, Joel; Lockman, Zachary (1988). Workers on the Nile: Nationalism, Communism, Islam, and the Egyptian Working Class, 1882-1954. LB-Tauris. ISBN 9780691055060.
- Botman, Selma (1988). "The Historical Development of the Egyptian Communist Movement, 1942-1947". The Rise of Egyptian Communism, 1939-1970. Syracuse University Press. ISBN 9780815624431.
- D, H. S. (1946). "Egypt and Great Britain: The Egyptian Attitude to Treaty Revision". The World Today. 2 (5): 215–226. JSTOR 40392167.
- Doran, Michael (1999). "The Taproot of Egyptian Foreign Policy". Pan-Arabism before Nasser: Egyptian Power Politics and the Palestine Question. Oxford University Press. ISBN 9780195160086.
- Erlich, Haggai (1989). "The Rise and Fall of Sidqi, 1945–46: Students and the End of the Ancien Régime". Students and University in 20th Century Egyptian Politics. Routledge. ISBN 9781135778989.
- Kent, John (1998). "Britain and the Egyptian problem,1945–48". In Cohen, Michael J.; Kolinsky, Martin (eds.). Demise of the British Empire in the Middle East: Britain's Responses to Nationalist Movements, 1943-55. Psychology Press. doi:10.4324/9780203044483. ISBN 9780714648040.
- Khadduri, Majid (1952). "The Anglo-Egyptian Controversy". Proceedings of the Academy of Political Science in. 24 (4): 82–100. doi:10.2307/1173508. JSTOR 1173508.
- Ginat, Rami (2003). "The Egyptian Left and the Roots of Neutralism in the Pre-Nasserite Era". British Journal of Middle Eastern Studies. 30 (1): 5–24. doi:10.1080/1353019032000059063. ISSN 1353-0194. JSTOR 3593243.
- Gherson, Randolph (1953). "The Anglo-Egyptian Question". Middle East Institute. 5 (4): 456–483. JSTOR 4322541.
- Hahn, Peter L. (1991). "Commercial Rivalry, Egyptian Nationalism, and Strategic Interests: The United States and Anglo-Egyptian Disputes, 1937-1946". The United States, Great Britain, and Egypt, 1945-1956: Strategy and Diplomacy in the Early Cold War. University of North Carolina Press. ISBN 9780807819425.
- Lerman, Eran (2022). Britain's Imperial Position in Egypt, 1942-1947: The Politics of National Aspirations and the Emergence of the Post-war Order. Sussex Academic Press. ISBN 1789761352.
- Louis, William Roger (1984). "Egypt: British 'Evacuation' and the 'Unity of the Nile Valley'". The British Empire in the Middle East, 1945-1951: Arab Nationalism, the United States, and Postwar Imperialism. Oxford University Press.
- Mason, Michael (1994). "Killing Time: The British Army and its Antagonists in Egypt, 1945–1954". War & Society. 12 (2): 103–126. doi:10.1179/072924794791200214.
- Mitchell, Richard P. (1969). The Society of the Muslim Brothers. Oxford University Press.
- Pioppi, Daniela (2023). "Between Reformism and Revolution: the Muslim Brotherhood and the Student Movement in Egypt in the 1930s and 1940s". Studi Magrebini. 21 (2): 168–187. doi:10.1163/2590034x-20230088. ISSN 0585-4954.
- Qayyum, Shah Abdul (1973). "Egypt's Demand for Revision of 1936 Treaty: The Sidqi-Bevin Draft Agreement". Egypt Reborn: A Study of Egypt's Freedom Movement, 1945-52. New Dehli: S. Chand Group. ISBN 9780842605342.
- Rahman, H. (1994). A British Defence Problem in the Middle East: The Failure of the 1946 Anglo-Egyptian Negotiations. Ithaca Press.
- Sorby, Karol B. (2018). "Britain's Effort to Continue Its Tutelage of Egypt After the WWII, 1945 – 1947" (PDF). Asian and African Studies. 27 (2): 125–142.
- Tripp, Charles (1998). "Egypt 1945-52: The Uses of Disorder". In Cohen, Michael J.; Kolinsky, Martin (eds.). Demise of the British Empire in the Middle East: Britain's Responses to Nationalist Movements, 1943-55. Psychology Press. doi:10.4324/9780203044483. ISBN 9780714648040.
