= 1942 Abdeen Palace incident =

Attempted British coup in Egypt

Coordinates: 30.042°N 31.247°E

- Part of Egypt in World War II
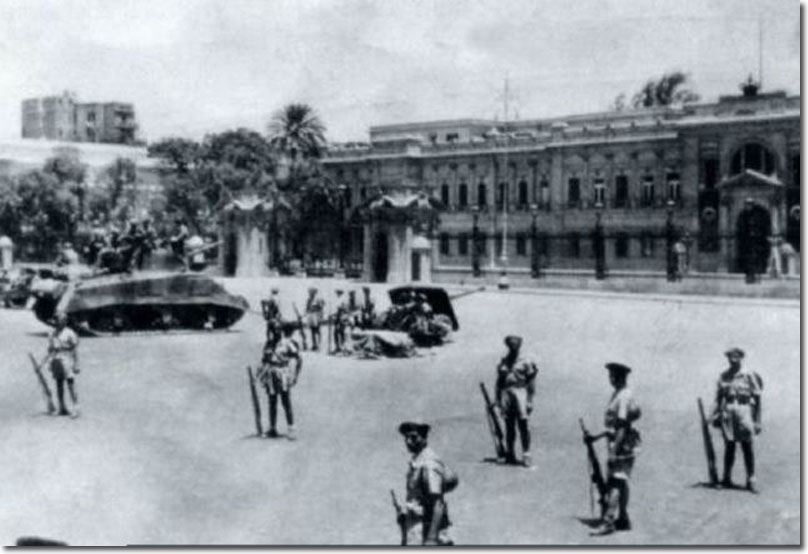
- British troops at Abdeen Palace, pictured in 1942
Date	4 February 1942
Location	Abdeen Palace, Cairo, Egypt
Result	British victory: King Farouk narrowly avoids abdication; Mostafa el-Nahas is appointed prime minister.

Belligerents
United Kingdom	Kingdom of Egypt

Commanders and leaders
(United Kingdom) Miles Lampson (United Kingdom) Oliver Lyttelton (United Kingdom) Robert Stone (United Kingdom) Walter Monckton	(Kingdom of Egypt) Farouk I (surrendered) (Kingdom of Egypt) Hussein Sirri (Kingdom of Egypt) Mohamed Naguib

The Abdeen Palace incident was a military confrontation that took place on 4 February 1942 at Abdeen Palace in Cairo, and nearly resulted in the forced abdication of King Farouk I. It is considered a landmark in the history of Egypt.

== Background ==
Following the 1919 Egyptian revolution, Egyptian politics has been described as a three-legged stool: the conservative palace, led by the King and his conservative allies, the liberal Wafd Party, led by Mostafa el-Nahas since 1927, and the British government. The popularity of the Wafd among the Egyptian masses frightened the palace and the British, who often worked together to contain and oust elected Wafdist governments. However, following the 1935–1936 protests in Egypt and the Italian invasion of Ethiopia, the British became convinced that coming to an agreement with Egyptian nationalists was vital to protect British interests in the region, specifically regarding the Suez Canal. The Anglo-Egyptian treaty of 1936 was signed following a Wafdist victory in the elections of that year. The treaty limited British forces to the Suez Canal zone, reduced the status of the British High Commissioner - then Sir Miles Lampson - to British ambassador, and set in motion the eventual end of the capitulations system, which was achieved the following year at the Montreux Convention. The treaty of 1936 also required Egypt to co-operate with the British in the case of war, though it did not specify that Egypt would declare war on Britain's enemies. Around this time, King Fuad I died and was succeeded by his son, the new King Farouk.

While signing the treaty was a major victory for the Wafd, the period 1937 to 1942 saw a major decline in their power. The King dismissed the government of Nahas, following a series of political disagreements with the palace. In 1937, the Wafd experienced a major internal split, resulting in the faction led by Ahmad Maher and Mahmoud el-Nokrashy leaving to form the Saadist Institutional Party. The 1938 parliamentary elections were rigged against the Wafd, leading to a majority anti-Wafd parliament. On the other side of the political spectrum, King Farouk was supported by the conservative Aly Maher and the Grand Imam of al-Azhar, Mustafa al-Maraghi. Maher and al-Maraghi believed that Nahas was the main threat and supported a conservative Islamic monarchy as opposed to the secularism in the Wafd. This forced the Wafd to align closer to the British. As one British observer remarked: the Wafd is in our pockets and particularly the Ambassador's.

When World War II began, Aly Maher was prime minister. While Maher cooperated with the British, he did not completely satisfy British wishes. Maher broke off all diplomatic and commercial relations with Nazi Germany, confiscated German property, and interned German subjects, later breaking off relations with Italy as well. However, the British were disappointed that Maher did not commit Egypt to officially declaring war, and were suspicious of the palace, which had close relations with the Italian community in Egypt. The British could not tolerate any neutral or pro-Axis tendency, even going so far as to plan for a forceful removal of the King as early as June 1940.

Following the dismissal of Maher, Hassan Sabry was appointed as prime minister. While Sabry was close to the British, he died in November 1940 and was succeeded by Hussein Sirri. Sirri was another pro-British politician; Lampson himself remarked that the British were lucky to have him. Yet Sirri had no real political support behind him and had to deal with a rising cost of living crisis and a hostile coalition: the Saadists under Ahmed Maher wanted Egypt to directly join the war. Meanwhile, the Wafd blamed the cost of living crisis on the British, seeking to cause a collapse of the government to make room for a Wafdist administration. The British believed that the Wafd's anti-British campaign was sponsored by the King. In short:

- The British wished to contain both the Wafd and the King, and supported a united front of political parties - including the Wafd. As Lampson put it, the goal of the British was "to try to keep the Wafd on the leash until the time comes to turn to them."
- The Wafd wished for the return of free elections in which they would dominate parliament and an all-Wafd government would be formed. The Wafd could not support the Axis, due to its support for liberal democracy, and instead supported co-operation with the British in exchange for full Egyptian independence after the war.
- The King and his allies wished to entrench monarchical power against liberal and British opposition, believing in "strict execution of the Treaty but no complacence towards the British".

From April to May 1941, Farouk met with political leaders to try to see if Nahas could join a coalition government. While Nahas offered his cooperation, the other parties refused to accept a coalition government with new elections. In June 1941, Amin Osman approached the British embassy to speak for Nahas. Three possible outcomes were proposed:

1. A pure Wafd government led by Nahas
2. A united front coalition government led by Nahas
3. A cabinet of independents led by Sirri with the backing of a united front.

Amin went further, suggesting a British intervention to bring the Wafd to power. Lampson refused to intervene at this moment, still encouraging a coalition government.

== Confrontation ==
On 6 January 1942, Sirri's government cut off diplomatic relations with Vichy France. This infuriated King Farouk, who was not consulted, and demanded the resignation of the foreign minister, eventually culminating in Sirri's resignation the first of February. When Lampson asked Sirri who should replace him, he simply replied: "Send for the Wafd". On 2 February 1942, Lampson presented King Farouk with four demands:

1. We must have a government that is loyal to the terms of the Treaty and able to implement both its spirit and letter, citing especially Article 5 of the Treaty.
2. A strong government able to govern and commanding popular and adequate support.
3. This meant sending for Nahas as leader of the Majority Party in the country and consulting him with a view to his forming a government.
4. That His Majesty should be held personally responsible for any disorders that might occur in the meantime.

King Farouk responded that while he agreed with points 1 and 2, he was consulting with Nahas to form a government. Nahas still rejected the idea of a coalition at this time, since he believed a coalition with 'king's men' would restrict his ability to get things done. He was willing to form a Wafd government if instructed to by the King. On the 2nd, Lampson favored a coalition government, but by the next day he was determined to bring Nahas to office. On the fourth, Lampson gave an ultimatum to Ahmed Hassanein:

Unless I hear by 6 P.M. today that Nahas has been asked to form a Government His Majesty King Farouk must accept the consequences.

Farouk had a meeting with all the party leaders, including Nahas, to issue the following response:

In their opinion the British ultimatum is a great infringement of the Anglo-Egyptian Treaty and of the independence of the country. For this reason and acting on their advice His Majesty cannot consent to an action resulting in an infringement of the Anglo-Egyptian Treaty and of the Country.

It was after Hassanein delivered this document that Lampson and Oliver Lyttleton drafted the abdication proclamation. On the night of 4 February 1942, General Robert Stone surrounded Abdeen Palace in Cairo with troops and tanks, and Lampson presented Farouk with an abdication decree drafted by Sir Walter Monckton. Farouk was going to sign until Hassanein intervened in Arabic. Farouk then asked if he could still appoint Nahas. Lampson agreed. As he put it:

It was sorely tempting to have insisted on King Farouk's abdication which I believe I could have extracted. But the course of wisdom seemed on the balance (very reluctantly I admit) to lie in allowing him to send for Nahas. After all if he had agreed at 6.00 p.m. we should be glad to have accepted this solution: the fact that his acceptance came three hours later would hardly have justified a different sanction of ejection however tempting.

== Legacy ==
The Wafd emerged as an anti-British and Egyptian nationalist force ever since the 1919 revolution. The fact that the British were now appointing the Wafd greatly damaged their prestige among Egyptian nationalists. After their wartime government from 1942-1944, the Wafd wouldn't enter government again until 1950. In his memoirs, Mohamed Naguib, one of the leaders of the Egyptian revolution of 1952, and Egypt's first president, cited the incident as a major factor in the rise of revolutionary, anti-monarchical sentiment in the country that contributed to the revolution ten years later.

== See also ==
- Egypt in World War II

== Sources ==
- Arab, Mohamed Samer; الشروق, دار (2016). 4 فبراير 1942 [February 4, 1942] (in Arabic). Dar Shorouq. ISBN 9789770932391.
- Kolinsky, Martin (1998). "Lampson and the wartime control of Egypt". In Cohen, Michael J.; Kolinsky, Martin (eds.). Demise of the British Empire in the Middle East: Britain's Responses to Nationalist Movements, 1943-55. Psychology Press. ISBN 9780714648040.
- ——————— (1999). "British Intervention in Egyptian Politics". Britain’s War in the Middle East: Strategy and Diplomacy, 1936–42. Palgrave. doi:10.1007/978-1-349-27636-3_9.
- Morsy, Laila Amin (1989). "Britain's Wartime Policy in Egypt, 1940–42". Middle Eastern Studies. 25 (1): 64–94. doi:10.1080/00263208908700768.
- ———————— (1994). "Indicative cases of Britain's wartime policy in Egypt, 1942–44". Middle Eastern Studies. 30 (1): 91–122. doi:10.1080/00263209408700985. JSTOR 4283617.
- Smith, Charles D. (1979). "4 February 1942: Its Causes and Its Influence on Egyptian Politics and on the Future of Anglo-Egyptian Relations, 1937–1945". International Journal of Middle East Studies. 10 (4). Cambridge University Press: 453–479. doi:10.1017/s0020743800051291. ISSN 0020-7438. JSTOR 162213. OCLC 1226911. S2CID 154143856.
- Warburg, Gabriel (1975). "Lampson's ultimatum to Faruq, 4 February 1942". Middle Eastern Studies. 11 (1). London: Cass Taylor & Francis: 24–32. doi:10.1080/00263207508700285. ISSN 1743-7881. JSTOR 4282554. OCLC 237511833.
- Wichhart, Stefanie (2021). "Abdin Palace and "British Bayonets," January 1942- October 1942". Britain, Egypt, and Iraq during World War II: The Decline of Imperial Power in the Middle East. I.B Tauris. ISBN 978-0-7556-3453-8.
