= Makram Ebeid =

Egyptian politician (1889–1961)

- مكرم عبيد باشا
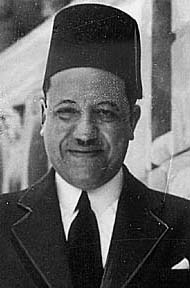
- Makram Ebeid Pasha

Minister of Transportation
- In office 16 March 1928 – 25 June 1928
- Prime Minister: Mustafa el-Nahhas
- Preceded by: Ahmed Mohamed Khashaba Pasha
- Succeeded by: Abdul Hamid Suleiman Pasha

Minister of Finance
- In office 1 January 1930 – 19 June 1930
- Prime Minister: Mustafa el-Nahhas
- Preceded by: Mustafa Maher Pasha
- Succeeded by: Ismail Sidqi Pasha
- In office 9 May 1936 – 20 December 1937
- Prime Minister: Mustafa el-Nahhas
- Preceded by: Ahmed Abdel Wahab Pasha
- Succeeded by: Ismail Sidqi Pasha
- In office 4 February 1942 – 26 May 1942
- Prime Minister: Mustafa el-Nahhas
- Preceded by: Abdul Hamid Badawi Pasha
- Succeeded by: Kamil Sidqi Pasha
- In office 8 October 1944 – 15 February 1946
- Prime Minister: Ahmad Maher Pasha Mahmoud El Nokrashy
- Preceded by: Kamil Sidqi Pasha
- Succeeded by: Ismail Sidqi Pasha

Personal details
- Born: 25 October 1889 Qena, Khedivate of Egypt
- Died: 5 June 1961 (aged 71)
- Party: Wafdist Bloc
- Other political affiliations: Wafd Party

Makram Ebeid (Note: Last name also spelled Ubayd or Ubaid.) Pasha (Arabic: مكرم عبيد باشا; 25 October 1889 – 5 June 1961) was an Egyptian politician. A supporter of liberal politics, he was exiled to the Seychelles alongside Saad Zaghloul and Mustafa Nahhas during the 1919 revolution. He was one of the founders of the Wafd Party and was its secretary-general between 1927 and 1942. He was the Minister of Communications in 1928 and the Minister of Finance in 1930, 1936–1937 and 1942. He was also president of the bar association from 1933 to 1936. He later split from the Wafd part after a financial scandal to form the 'Wafdist Bloc' party, serving as Minister of Finance from 1944 to 1946.

== Family history and early life ==
Ebeid came from a prestigious well-known Coptic Christian family in Qena, Upper Egypt. His family was originally from Asyut where his grandfather married the daughter of Jirjis al-Jawhari. (Note: Another source says it was his great grandfather.) Ebeid's father owned thirty feddans of land but later was involved in construction work of the railway from Nag Hammadi to Luxor, the completion of which led to being granted the title of bey, second class and the order of al-Majidi from the khedive. He bought around 900 feddans around Qena and died in December 1925.

Makram Ebeid was born William Makram Ebeid, one of eleven children. His first name, "William", was later dropped due political concerns with the British protectorate in Egypt. He was noted as one of the brightest of the family. He went to primary school at a government school in Qena around 1900 alongside the famous writer Abbas Mahmoud al-Aqqad. He then studied at a short time at Al-Tawfiqia Secondary School in Cairo until his father advised him to enroll at the American school in Asyut. Later, he studied law at New College, Oxford from 1905 to 1908 at the suggestion of Akhnoukh Fanous. Ebeid was one of the youngest ever to be admitted in the college. After graduating, Ebeid moved to France to study at Lyons University for two years to study Egyptology and eventually returned to Egypt. He married the daughter of Murqus Hanna. He was the uncle of Mona Makram-Ebeid.

== Rise in Wafd Party ==
In 1913, Ebeid was the secretary of the official gazette of the Ministry of Justice, al-Waqa'i al-Misriyya. He then worked as the private secretary of British legal advisors of the ministry from 1915 to 1918. He resigned due to political differences with William Brunyate. His resignation during the 1919 Egyptian revolution attracted the attention of Sa'ad Zaghloul, who leading a delegation (Arabic: Wafd) of Egyptian nationalists at the Paris Peace Conference to advocate Egyptian Independence. This demand was refused, and the Wafd eventually turned into a political party following the Unilateral Declaration of Egyptian Independence in 1922, soon beginning to campaign for internal autonomy, constitutional government, civil rights, and Egyptian control of both the Sudan and the Suez Canal. Zaghloul, impressed by Ebeid's intelligence and eloquence, declared him his political son and supporter, marking Ebeid's rise in the ranks of the Wafd party. Ebeid was then a tutor at the Royal School of Law where he tutored fellow Wafdists, such as Ibrahim Abdel Hady. He was dismissed from the school in August 1921 for attending a banquet in honor of Zaghloul. Around this time in September 1921, Ebeid rejected his father's conversion to Protestantism and embraced Coptic Christianity.

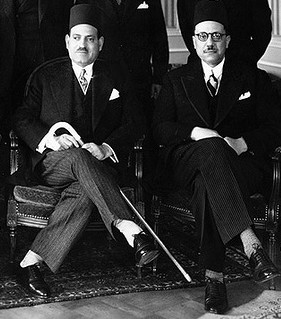
Ebeid (right) with Mostafa El-Nahhas

Ebeid was a member of several of Zaghloul's delegation to London, giving several speeches and interviews to the British press. On 22 December 1921, the British government deported several Wafdists to the Seychelles, including Zaghloul, Ebeid and Mustafa Nahhas. When they arrived back to Egypt in 1923, Ebeid was a member of the Secretariat of the Wafdists Reorganized High Command, and would continue to serve of secretary of the high command while in the party. After the Wafdist victory in the 1923–24 Egyptian parliamentary election, his father-in-law became Minister of Public Works. Ebeid joined Zaghloul in another delegation to the UK to negotiate with the government of Ramsay MacDonald, but returned empty handed. After resignation of Zaghloul, Ebeid was arrested on 27 November 1924 for inciting the Egyptian masses in his speeches. Throughout his political career as a Wafdist he represented his hometown of Qena in parliament.

After the death of Zaghloul in 1927, Mustafa al-Nahhas became the new leader of the party with Ebeid as secretary-general and the minister of communication in Nahhas' first government in 1928. He was involved in negotiations with Britain as a cabinet minister is Nahhas' first (1928) and second (1930) government. While president of the bar association, he defended his former classmate and then parliamentarian Abbas al-Aqqad when he was arrested for insulting the king. In 1936, Ebeid was selected by royal decree to a part of the negotiating team with Britain. After the Wafdist victory in the 1936 elections, he was given the title pasha and became minister of finance in Nahhas' cabinet. He was also a signatory to the 1936 Anglo-Egyptian Treaty.

Around this time, the party was led by four men: Nahhas, Ebied, Ahmad Maher, and Mahmoud al-Nuqrashi. During the 1935–1936 Egyptian protests, the latter two supported the immediate restoration of the 1923 constitution, while the former two thought that this demand was too far at the moment. Tensions between these two factions continue to boil. Ebeid and al-Nuqrashi clashed over a plan to electrify the Aswan dam. This incident convinced Nahhas to drop al-Nuqrashi and three of his supporters from the cabinet in August 1937. On 14 September, he was removed from the party, later joined by Maher. They would go on to form the Sa'adist party.

== Criticism of Wafd Party and political decline ==
Following the Abdeen Palace incident in 1942 and the appointment of a new Wafdist government, conflict was brewing between Nahhas and Ebeid. Ebeid objected to the rise in corruption in the party, especially quarreling with Nahhas' wife. Nahhas, on his end, was suspicious of meetings between Ebeid and the king. On 23 May 1942, Ebeid told the press that he objected to the promotion of three officials in the cabinet. On the 26th, Nahhas reshuffled his government to exclude Ebeid. On 8 July, Ebeid was dismissed from the party alongside fifteen other members in the chamber. These dissidents organized a new party called Hizb al-Kutlah al-Wafdiyyah (Wafdist Bloc).

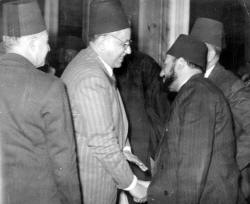
Ebeid with Hassan al-Banna

Following the death of Saad Zaghloul, the Wafd party began to see a rise in corruption. In February 1943, Ebeid published the Black Book, which accused Nahhas and his colleagues of favoritism and corruption. The book was secretly published. His younger brother left copies on the desks of cabinet ministers; royal advisor Ahmed Hassanein was given a copy to personally hand to King Farouk. The book accused Nahhas and his wife of buying their home with ill-gotten money and price fixing of sugar and yarn. Because Egypt was under martial law due to World War II, Ebeid was placed under house arrest on May 9, and later moved to the delta and then a Cairo hospital; Fouad Serageddin replaced him as Wafd secretary. He would not released until 9 October 1944, after the fall of the Wafd government. (Note: el-Feki puts this date as 7 October.) The rise of disunity and corruption within the ranks of the Wafd marked the decline of Ebeid's position in the political scene. His last ministerial position was minister of finance in the Sa'adist government following the dismissal of the Wafdist government in 1944. He resigned in February 1946 amid the 1946 Egyptian protests, bringing down al-Nuqrashi's government. He was chosen to be a member of a limited committee for a new constitution in 1953.

== Relationship with the Muslim Brotherhood ==
Ebeid had a cordial relationship with Hassan al-Banna, founder of the Muslim Brotherhood. He was the only politician to condemn its official dissolution in 1948. He was also one of two men allowed to attend the latter's funeral along with his father in February 1949, as being a government figure, meanwhile any other man would be arrested.

== Death ==
Ebeid died of a liver ailment on 5 June 1961 in his villa near Cario. More than 15,000 mourners attended his funeral at the Saint Mark's Coptic Orthodox Cathedral, Azbakeya where he was eulogized by Anwar Sadat and Gamal Nasser.

== Legacy ==
Makram Ebeid has a street in Egypt named after him, and is taught as one of the main heroes of Egypt in history books, he and his family played a major role in forming Egypt's Golden Age. The family to this day is well known among the elite politicians, they are involved in a lot of charity and continue to support liberal politics.

== Bibliography ==
- Atiya, Aziz S., ed. (1991). "Makram Ebied". The Coptic Encyclopedia. Vol. 5. Macmillan Publishing Company. pp. 1515–1516.
- Coury, Ralph (January 1995). "The Arab Nationalism of Makram ʿUbayd". Journal of Islamic Studies. 6 (1): 76–90. JSTOR 26195545.
- El-Feki, Mustafa (1993). "Makram Ebeid: politician of the majority party". In Tripp, Charles (ed.). Contemporary Egypt: Through Egyptian Eyes. Routledge. ISBN 9780415061032.
- ——————— (1991). Copts in Egyptian Politics, 1919-1952 (PDF). General Egyptian Book Organization. ISBN 9789770127964.
- ——————— (January 1985). "A Coptic Leader in the Egyptian National Movement". International Studies. 22 (1): 33–58. doi:10.1177/0020881785022001004.
- Goldschmidt Jr, Arthur (2003). "UBAYD, [WILLIAM] MAKRAM (1889–1961)". Historical Dictionary of Egypt (5th ed.). Scarecrow Press. pp. 403–404. ISBN 978-0-8108-6586-0.
- —————————— (2000). "'Ubayd, William Makram". Biographical Dictionary of Modern Egypt. Lynne Rienner Publishers. p. 217. ISBN 9781555872298.
- Long, Richard (2005). "Appendix 2: Egyptian personalities". British Pro-Consuls in Egypt, 1914-1929 : The Challenge of Nationalism. RoutledgeCurzon. pp. 192–193.
- Lynn Carter, Barbara (2013) [1986]. The Copts in Egyptian Politics: 1918-1952. Routledge Library Editions: Egypt. Vol. 11. Croom Helm. ISBN 9780709934172.
- Lynn Carter, Barbara (December 1982). Communalism in Egyptian politics: The experience of the Copts, 1918-1952 (PDF) (Thesis). School of Oriental and African Studies, University of London.
- Rizk, Younan Labib (1978). الوفد والكتاب الأسود [The Wafd and the Black Book] (in Arabic). Al-Ahram Center for Political and Strategic Studies. ISBN 9789777248013.
- Terry, Janice J. (1982). The Wafd: Cornerstone of Egyptian Political Power. Publisher: Third World Centre for Research and Publishing. ISBN 9780861990009.
