= Second cabinet of Nokrashy Pasha =

Egyptian government between December 1946 and December 1948

Second Cabinet of Nokrashy Pasha
- Cabinet of Kingdom of Egypt

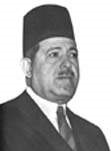
- Prime Minister Mahmoud El Nokrashy Pasha
- Date formed: 10 December 1946
- Date dissolved: 28 December 1948

People and organisations
- Head of state: King Farouk
- Head of government: Mahmoud El Nokrashy Pasha
- Member party: Saadist Institutional Party; Liberal Constitutional Party
- Opposition party: Wafd Party

History
- Predecessor: Cabinet of Ismail Sidky
- Successor: Cabinet of Ibrahim Abdel Hady Pasha

The second cabinet formed by Mahmoud El Nokrashy Pasha lasted between December 1946 and December 1948. It succeeded the cabinet led by Ismail Sidky who resigned from the premiership on 8 December 1946. Next day King Farouk asked Mahmoud El Nokrashy Pasha, head of the Saadist Institutional Party, to form the cabinet which was announced on 10 December. The cabinet was a coalition government comprising members of the Saadist Institutional Party and the Liberal Constitutional Party and was confirmed by the Parliament on 16 December with 150 confidence against 21 objection votes.

One of the significant tasks carried out by the government was the continuation of the negotiations with the British authorities to finalize the independence of Sudan as proposed by the British. As his predecessor, Ismail Sidky, Nokrashy Pasha could not settle the issue. On 28 December 1948 Prime Minister Mahmoud El Nokrashy Pasha was assassinated, and Ibrahim Abdel Hady Pasha was appointed prime minister.

== List of ministers ==
The cabinet members were as follows:

Portfolio	Minister	Took office	Left office	Party
Prime Minister	Mahmoud El Nokrashy Pasha	10 December 1946	1948	Saadist
Minister of Foreign Affairs	Mahmoud El Nokrashy Pasha	10 December 1946	1948	Saadist
Minister of Finance	Ibrahim Abdel Hady Pasha	10 December 1946	18 February 1947	Saadist
Minister of Finance	Abdel Majid Badr Pasha	18 February 1947	1948	
Minister of Interior	Mahmoud El Nokrashy Pasha	10 December 1946	1948	Saadist
Minister of Defense	Ahmed Atiyah Pasha	10 December 1946	1948	Liberal Constitutional Party
Minister of Education	Abdel Razzaq Al Sanhuri Pasha	10 December 1946	1948	Saadist
Minister of Commerce	Abdel Majid Badr Pasha	10 December 1946	18 February 1947	Saadist
Minister of Commerce	Mahmoud Riaz	18 February 1947	1948	
Minister of Social Affairs	Mahmoud Hasan Pasha	10 December 1946	1948	Saadist
Minister of Public Health	Najib Iskandar Pasha	10 December 1946	1948	Saadist
Minister of Justice	Ahmad Khashaba Pasha	10 December 1946	1948	Liberal Constitutional Party
Minister of Public Works	Abdel Majid Salih Pasha	10 December 1946	1948	Liberal Constitutional Party
Minister of Agriculture	Ahmad Abdel Ghaffar Pasha	10 December 1946	1948	Liberal Constitutional Party
Minister of Information	Ibrahim Dessuki Abaza Pasha	10 December 1946	1948	Liberal Constitutional Party

Muhammad Alluba Pasha was appointed the minister of waqf, but he declined the offer due to his objection to the government program.
