= 1945 Egyptian parliamentary election =

- 9 January 1945
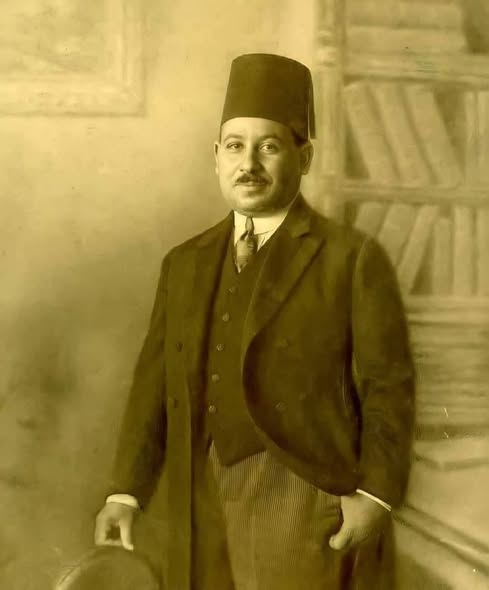

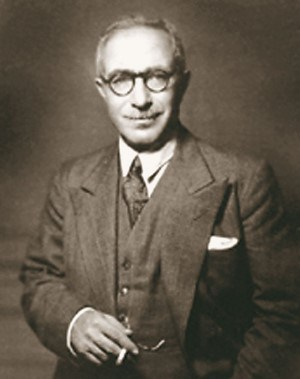

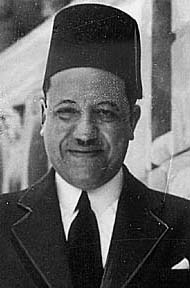
	First party	Second party	Third party
Leader	Ahmad Maher Pasha	Mohammed Hussein Heikal	Makram Ebeid
Party	Saadist	Liberal Constitutional	Wafdist Block
Seats won	126	75	18
Prime Minister before election
Ahmad Maher Pasha
Saadist
Subsequent Prime Minister
Ahmad Maher Pasha
Saadist

Parliamentary elections were held in Egypt on 9 January 1945. Boycotted by the Wafd Party, they resulted in a victory for the Saadist Institutional Party, which won 126 of the 264 seats.

== Results ==
Dolf Sternberger et al, the Political Handbook and Atlas of the World and P. J. Vatikiotis give the totals as 125 seats for the Saadist Institutional Party, 74 seats for the Liberal Constitutional Party, 29 for the Wafdist Block, 7 for the National Party and 29 for independents. (Note: Sternberger et al. notes that another source mostly agrees except for one seat: 124 Saadist and 30 for the Wafdist Block) Egypt in 1945 has the same figures as except for independents, which it puts at 34, as well as 64 out of 140 Wafdists in the Senate. Six members of the Muslim Brotherhood ran the election, including its founder Hasan al-Banna who ran in Ismailia, but all candidates lost.

Party	Votes	%	Seats
Saadist Institutional Party	739,717	41.95	126
Liberal Constitutional Party	427,899	24.27	75
Wafdist Block (Note: Splinter party formed by Makrem Ebied after his expulsion from the Wafd Party)	354,570	20.11	18
National Party	67,700	3.84	7
Independents	173,485	9.84	38
Total	1,763,371	100.00	264
Total votes	1,770,238	–	
Registered voters/turnout	3,234,042	54.74	
Source: Khatib

== Aftermath ==
Parliament sat on 18 January that year and was dissolved on 7 November 1949.

== Sources ==
- Khatib, M.F. (1954). The working of parliamentary institutions in Egypt, 1924-1952 (Thesis). University of Edinburgh.
- Sternberger, Dolf; Vogel, Bernhard; Nohlen, Dieter; Landfried, Klaus, eds. (1978). Die Wahl Der Parlamente Und Anderer Staatsorgane: Ein Handbuch (in German). Walter de Gruyter GmbH.
