= Mona Makram-Ebeid =

Egyptian politician and academic

Mona Makram-Ebeid (Arabic: منى مكرم عبيد; born 20 March 1943 in Qena) is an Egyptian politician and academic, Professor of Political Science and Political Sociology at the American University of Cairo.

== Life ==
From a Coptic Wafdist family prominent in Egyptian politics, Mona Makram-Ebeid was inspired and learnt much from her uncle as a child, the politician Makram Ebeid. She was educated at Harvard University, the University of Cairo and the American University of Cairo.

She joined the Wafd Party in 1983, but from 1990 to 1995 was appointed by President Mubarak as a member of the People's Assembly of Egypt. She returned to the Wafd Party, though left that to join Ayman Nour’s El-Ghad Party. Rejoining the Wafd Party, she resigned for a third time after the Egyptian revolution of 2011, criticizing the actions of the coalition between the Wafd party and the Muslim Brotherhood.

She and two other Wafd members, Alaa Abdel Monem and Mostafa al-Guindi, left the Democratic Alliance for Egypt and joined the Egyptian Bloc.
