= Muhammad Mandur =

Egyptian literary critic

Muhammad Mandur (1907–1965) was an Egyptian literary critic. His criticism evolved to place an increasing emphasis on social engagement. As well as his own work, Mandur translated work by Georges Duhamel, Alfred de Musset, Flaubert and others from French to Arabic.

== Life ==
Born in the Egyptian Delta, Muhammad Mandur attended secondary school in Tanta before reading literature and law at the Cairo University. He was influenced by Taha Husayn, who helped him gain in 1930 a scholarship for further study in Paris; In 1939 he returned to Egypt and was appointed a lecturer at the University of Cairo. In 1942 he was appointed to the literary faculty of the new University of Alexandria, and in 1943 he completed his doctorate with Ahmad Amin as supervisor.

Denied academic promotion, Mandur resigned his university post in 1944 and became an editor of the Wafdist newspaper al-Misri. Three months later he became chief editor of the party paper al-Wafd al-misri, until it was charged with communism and shut down in 1946. Manduri becameeditor of another Wafdist daily, Sawt al-Umma.

Mandur registered as a barrister in 1948 and became an MP for the Wafd Party in 1949. He also began teaching at the Institute of Dramaturgy, keeping this job after political parties were dissolved at the 1952 Revolution.

In 1956 he travelled in Romania and the Soviet Union. In 1962 Mandur was awarded the State Encouragement Prize for Literature. He died in Cairo on May 20, 1965.

== Work ==
A book of essays, Fi'l-Mizan al-Jadid (1944) rapidly established Mandur's reputation as a critic of modern Arabic poetry. The book discussed the use of myth in poetry, and the tone and metres of Arabic poetry.
