= 1938 Egyptian parliamentary election =

- 6 April 1938
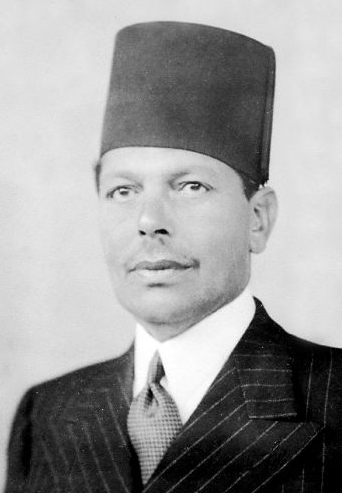

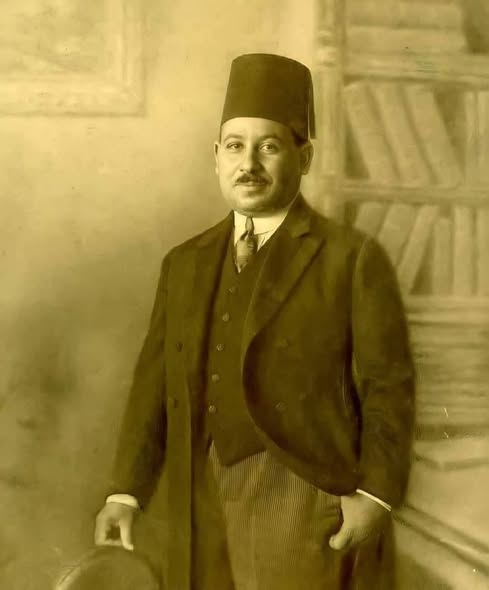

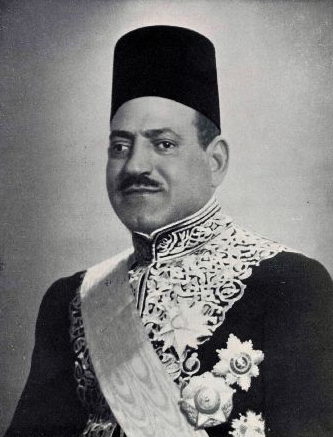
| | First party | Second party | Third party |
|---|---|---|---|
| Leader | Mohammed Mahmoud | Ahmad Maher Pasha | Mostafa el-Nahas |
| Party | Qawmiyyun (Note: Coalition of Liberal Constitutional Party, Ittihad Party, People's Party and National Party) | Saadist | Wafd |
| Seats won | 105 | 87 | 14 |
| Percentage | 42.61% | 25.43 | 6.26% |
Prime Minister before election
Mohamed Mahmoud Pasha
Liberal Constitutional
Subsequent Prime Minister
Mohamed Mahmoud Pasha
Liberal Constitutional

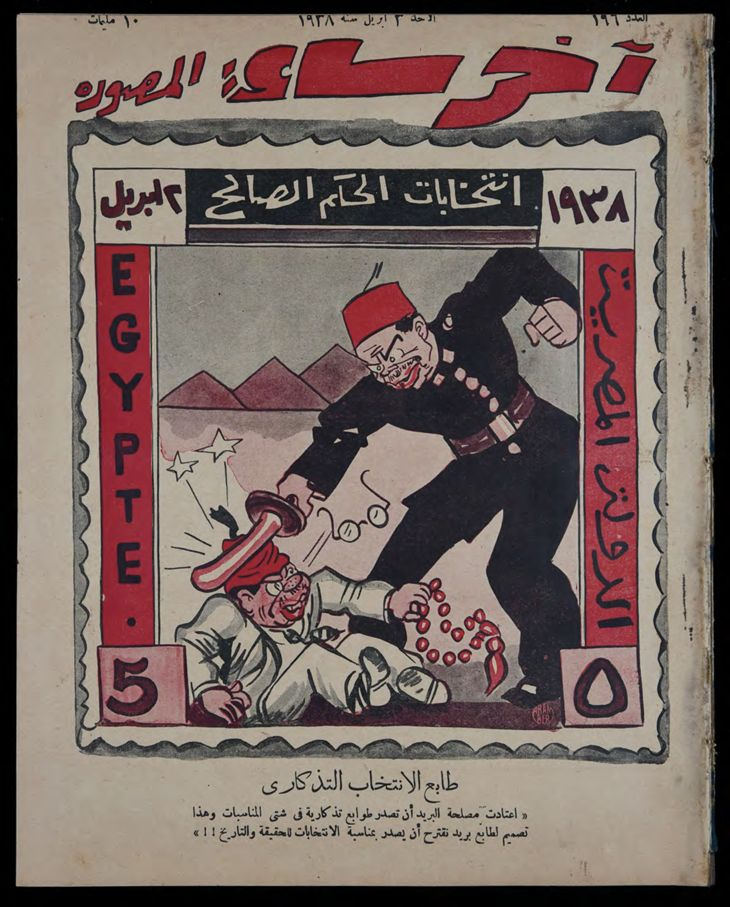
Cartoon by the political magazine Akhir Sa'ah showing a satirical commemorative stamp for the elections

Parliamentary elections were held in Egypt on 6 April 1938. (Note: According to another historian, prime minister Mahmud dissolved the Chamber of Deputies on 22 February and held elections in Upper and Middle Egypt on 31 March and in Lower Egypt on 2 April.) The result was a victory for the ruling coalition government, dubbed the Qawmiyyun, which won 105 of the 264 seats. This was the only election that the Wafd Party lost without boycotting, due to election rigging by the government.

== Background ==
Egyptian politics at this time was divided between the liberal Wafd Party and the conservative palace. The term 'the palace' refers both to the king and his advisors and the minor parties that were traditional enemies of the Wafd. After the Wafd Party won the 1936 elections its leader Mostafa el-Nahas was appointed prime minister. However, issues quickly arose between the Wafd and the conservative palace. The Wafd opposed holding the coronation ceremony for King Farouk in a religious manner due to their secularist tendency. A constitutional crisis emerged over an empty seat in the Senate because the palace did not believe that the government had the right to appoint senators. The Wafd refused to disband its paramilitary youth wing, the Blue Shirts. Nahas' government was dismissed on 30 December 1937 after refusing to appoint Aly Maher as Chief of the Royal Cabinet. A split in the Wafd occurred when a faction led by Ahmad Maher and Mahmoud El Nokrashy left to form the Saadist Institutional Party. A new coalition government was led Prime Minister Mohamed Mahmoud of the Liberal Constitutionalist Party which dissolved parliament on 2 February 1938.

The anti-Wafdist parties joined forces as the Qawmiyyun (Nationalist) coalition to deny the Wafd victory. The government gerrymandered districts, intimidated Wafdist voters and threatened village leaders to rig the elections. The government also arrested several former Blue Shirt leaders in March, claiming to find a Wafdist plot to disrupt the elections.

== Results ==
Different sources give different results for the elections. Marius Deeb (1979) puts the results as 77 seats for the Liberal Constitutionalists, 84 for the Saadists, 12 for the Wafd, 11 for the People's Party, five for the Ittihad Party, three for the National Party and 72 independents. David Moore (1965) puts the victory at 143 seats for the coalition, 104 for the Saadists, 80 for independents and 14 for Wafdists. The Wafd held on to a plurality of seats in the Egyptian senate, 68 out of 140. According to the journalist Philip Graves, the coalition got 99 seats, the Saadists 84, independents 68 and Wafdists 12. The Political Handbook and Atlas of the World gives the numbers as 93 for Liberal Constitutionalists, 89 Saadists, 19 for Ittihad and the People's Party, 13 Wafdists, 3 Nationalists and 47 independents.

| Party | Votes | % | Seats |
|---|---|---|---|
| Qawmiyyun | 755,951 | 42.61 | 105 |
| Saadist Institutional Party | 451,146 | 25.43 | 87 |
| Wafd Party | 111,106 | 6.26 | 14 |
| Independents | 455,835 | 25.69 | 58 |
| Total | 1,774,038 | 100.00 | 264 |
| Total votes | 1,779,893 | – | |
| Registered voters/turnout | 3,003,326 | 59.26 | |
Source: Khatib

== Aftermath ==
Mohammed Mahmud remained prime minister until August 1939, when he was replaced by Ali Maher. Parliament sat on 8 May 1938 and was dissolved on 7 February 1942.

== Sources ==
- Deeb, Marius (1979). Party Politics in Egypt: the Wafd & its Rivals 1919–1939. Ithaca Press. ISBN 9780903729406.
- Graves, Philip (March 1938). "The Story of the Egyptian Crisis". Nineteenth Century and After. Vol. CXXIII, no. 733. pp. 297–313.
- Graves, Philip (May 1938). "The Egyptian Election". Nineteenth Century and After. Vol. CXXIII, no. 735. pp. 579–585.
- Jankowski, James P. (1970). "The Egyptian Blue Shirts and the Egyptian Wafd, 1935-1938". Middle Eastern Studies. 6 (1). Taylor & Francis: 77–95. JSTOR 4282308 – via JSTOR.
- Khatib, M.F. (1954). The working of parliamentary institutions in Egypt, 1924-1952 (Thesis). University of Edinburgh.
- Moore, David F. (1965). The Wafd Party of Egypt: 1936–1945 (Thesis). American University of Beirut. ProQuest 2316005707.
- Quraishi, Zaheer M. (1967). Liberal Nationalism in Egypt; Rise and Fall of the Wafd Party. Jamal Printing Press. ISBN 9780861990009.
- Terry, Janice J. (1982). The Wafd: Cornerstone of Egyptian Political Power. Third World Centre for Research and Publishing. ISBN 9780861990009.
