= Ibrahim Abdel Hady Pasha =

Prime Minister of Egypt (1948–1949)

- إبراهيم عبد الهادي
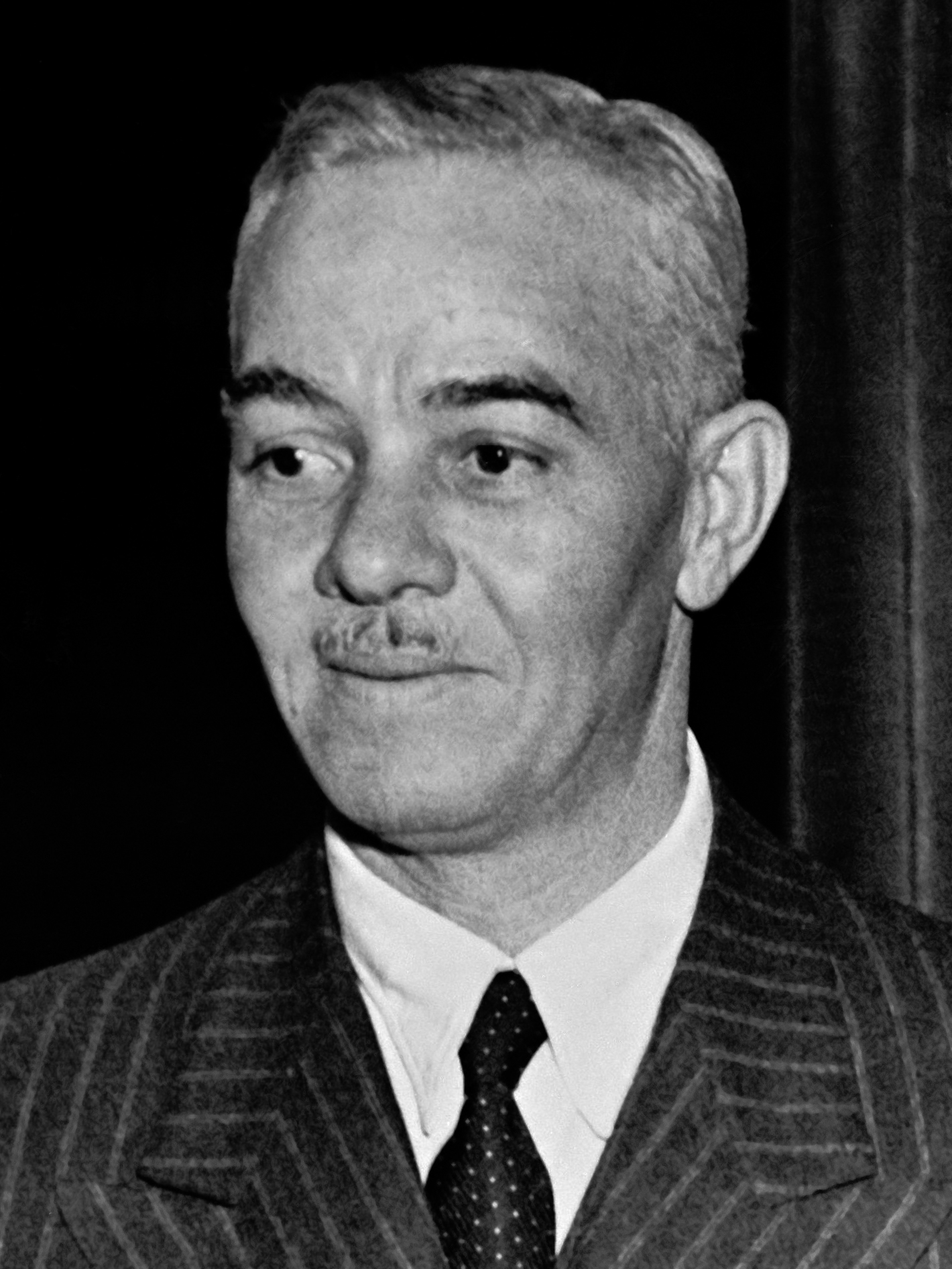
- Hady in 1948

28th Prime Minister of Egypt
- In office 28 December 1948 – 26 July 1949
- Monarch: Farouk
- Preceded by: Mahmoud El Nokrashy Pasha
- Succeeded by: Hussein Sirri Pasha

Personal details
- Born: 14 February 1896 Al-Zarqa, Egypt
- Died: 18 February 1981 (aged 85) Cairo, Egypt
- Party: Saadist Institutional Party

Ibrahim Abdel Hady Pasha (14 February 1896 (Note: Meital puts his birth year as 1899 but no date.) – 18 February 1981) was an Egyptian politician who was the 28th Prime Minister from 28 December 1948 until 26 July 1949. After the 1952 Egyptian revolution, he was placed on trial in the revolutionary court.

== Early life and politics ==
He was born in al-Zarqa, a town near Damietta in the Dakahlia Governorate. He studied at the Abbasiyya Secondary school in Alexandria. As a law student, he became a student leader during the 1919 Egyptian revolution, spending four years behind bars. He received his law license from the government law school in 1925. He served in the Chamber of Deputies representing his hometown in the 1929, 1936 and 1938 sessions. He was a member of the Wafd party until joining the Saadist Institutional Party during the split from the Wafd in 1938. He became Chief of the Royal Court (Divan) in late 1946. He also served as the Minister of Finance for a short time between 10 December 1946 and 18 February 1947 in the cabinet of Mahmoud El Nokrashy Pasha.

== Premiership ==
Hady became prime minister following the assassination of El Nokrashy, the leader of the Saadist party, by a member of the Muslim Brotherhood. As prime minister, Hady extended martial law, vowing to restore order. He issued a decree prescribing the death penalty for anyone carrying bombs and explosives, following the bombing of a court house. Thousands were arrested under his rule. Hassan al-Banna, the leader of the Brotherhood, was himself assassinated not long after, leading to suspicion of Hady's involvement. On 5 May 1949, there was an attempt on his life by the members of the Brotherhood. One of his final acts in government was to enhance Egypt's position in the Suez Canal board, such as increasing Egypt's seats on the Board of Directors. His government was eventually replaced on 26 July 1949. He lost his seat in the Egyptian senate following a purge of senators in July 1950.

== Post-premiership and trial ==
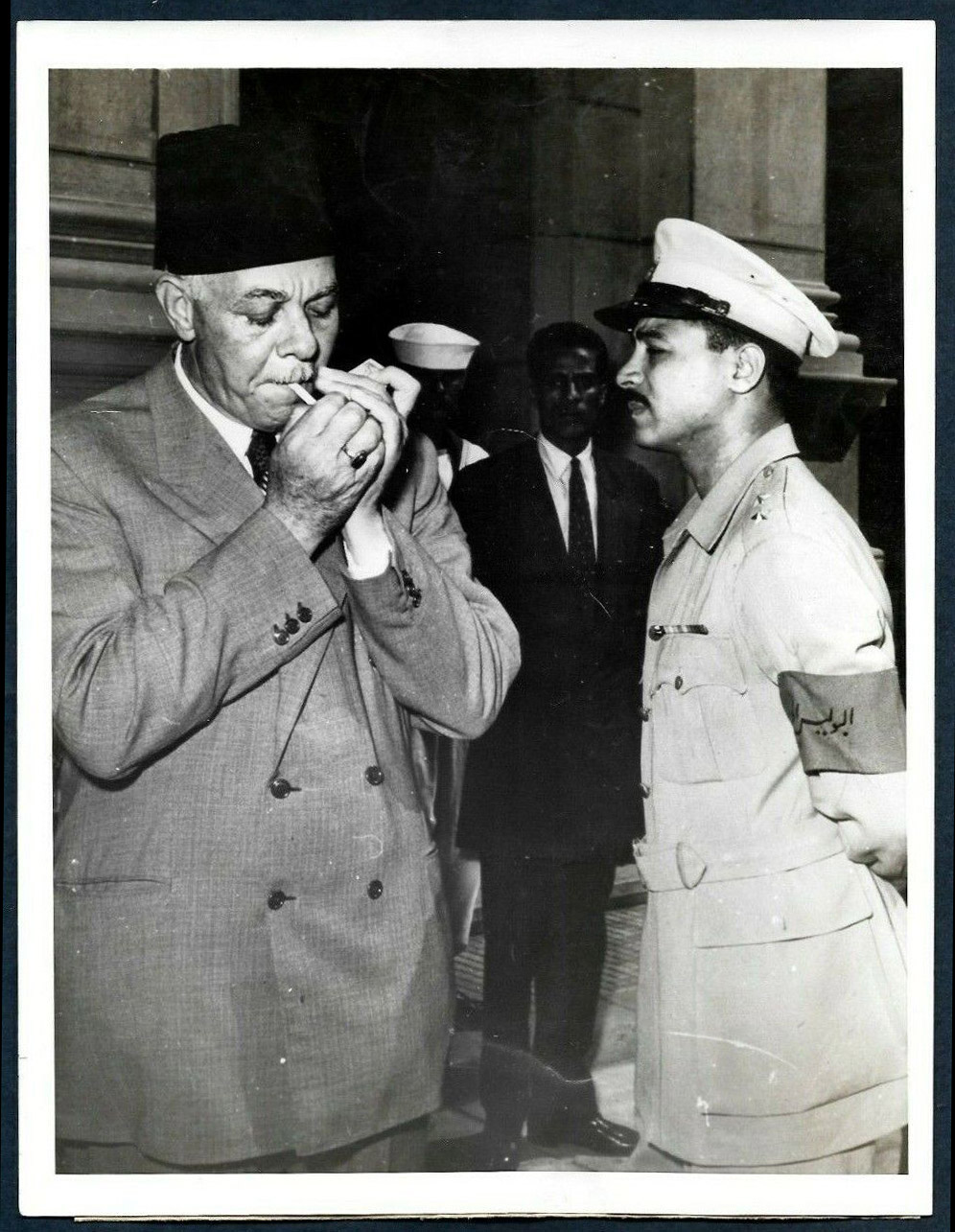
Hadi smoking a cigarette during his trial

Following the coup of the Free Officers in July 1952, the new ruling junta ordered existing political parties to "purify" themselves by purging their ranks of the old guards. al-Hady and his Sa'adist party took a more conciliatory stance towards the officers than other pre-revolutionary parties, ordering the creation of a new secretariat.

On 26 September 1953, he was taken to a revolutionary military tribunal following his arrest several days before. He was charged with treason against the country and revolution for being in contact with harmful "foreign elements" in 1953, treason against the country and its well-being due to his actions in the 1948 Palestine war, corruption due to his "reign of terror", and for the assassination of Hasan al-Banna. He pleaded not guilty to all four of these charges. During his trial, this request for additional council beyond his one attorney was denied. In his opening statement, he identified himself as a fellow revolutionary, denying accusations of treason, as well as arguing that King Farouk's decision to intervene in Palestine was not his responsibility.

The decision to intervene in Palestine was a key topic of debate in the trial. According to an interview with the Egyptian journalist Mohamed Hassanein Heikal, Heikal was informed by Hady in March 1948 that Egypt would not enter the war. At the trial, Hady argued that he was not aware of the decision to intervene before the public was aware, which was contradicted by evidence of his involvement in several senior government meetings that planned Egypt's intervention. On 1 October 1953, Hady was sentenced to execution by hanging and the confiscation of his property. The sentence was reduced to life imprisonment with hard labor on 4 October. He was released in 1954 for health reasons, and his property was restored in 1975.

== Sources ==
- Goldschmidt Jr, Arthur (2003). "ABD AL-HADI, IBRAHIM (1898–1981)". Historical Dictionary of Egypt (5th ed.). Scarecrow Press. pp. 23–24.
- —————————— (2000). "Abd al-Hadi, Ibrahim". Biographical Dictionary of Modern Egypt. Lynne Rienner Publishers. pp. 4–5.
- Gordon, Joel (1992). Nasser's Blessed Movement: Egypt's Free Officers and the July Revolution (PDF) (1st ed.). Oxford University Press.
- Gwady, Muhammed (2009). العمل السري في ثورة 1919: مذكرات الشبان الوفديين : مذكرات إبراهيم عبد الهادي، سيد باشا، عريان يوسف سعد، محمد مظهر سعيد [Clandestine Activity in the 1919 Revolution: Memoirs of Young Wafdists — Memoirs of Ibrahim Abdel Hadi, Sayyid Pasha, Erian Youssef Saad, and Mohamed Mazhar Saeed.]. Al-Shorouk International Bookstore.
- Meital, Yoram (2017). Revolutionary Justice: Special Courts and the Formation of Republican Egypt. Oxford University Press.
- Reid, Donald M. (1982). "Political Assassination in Egypt, 1910-1954". The International Journal of African Historical Studies. 15 (4): 625–651. doi:10.2307/217848. ISSN 0361-7882. JSTOR 217848.
- Sayf, Muḥammad ʻAzīz Muḥammad (2013). إبراهيم عبد الهادي ودوره في السياسة المصرية واغتيال حسن البنا مرشد جماعة الإخوان المسلمين [Ibrahim Abdel Hadi and his role in Egyptian politics and the assassination of Hassan al-Banna, the leader of the Muslim Brotherhood] (in Arabic). al-Maktab al-ʻArabī lil-Maʻārif. ISBN 978-977-276-650-5.
- Qayyum, Shah Abdul (1973). Egypt Reborn: A Study of Egypt's Freedom Movement, 1945-52. New Dehli: S. Chand Group.

Political offices
Preceded by Mahmoud El Nokrashy Pasha	Prime Minister of Egypt; 1948–1949	Succeeded by Hussein Sirri Pasha
