= Amin Osman =

Egyptian jurist and politician (1898–1946)

Minister of Finance
- In office 2 June 1943 – October 1944
- Prime Minister: Mustafa El Nahas
- Preceded by: Kamel Sidky

Personal details
- Born: 28 November 1898 Alexandria, Khedivate of Egypt
- Died: 5 January 1946 (aged 47) Cairo, Kingdom of Egypt
- Resting place: Tomb of Imam Al Shafi'i, Cairo
- Party: Independent (until 1944); Revival Party
- Spouse: Katie Osman
- Children: 1
- Education: Victoria College; Brasenose College, Oxford
- Awards: Order of the British Empire

Amin Osman, also known as Amin Osman Pasha, (28 November 1898 – 5 January 1946) was an Egyptian judge and politician who served as finance minister in the period 1943–1944. He was assassinated by Hussein Tawfik, who was connected with the Egyptian army officers, on 5 January 1946.

== Early life and education ==
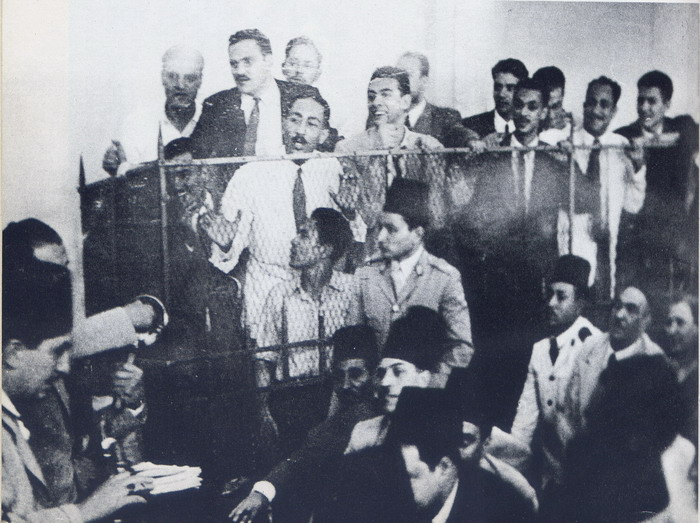
Anwar Sadat and others during the trials about the assassination of Amin Osman in late 1946

Amin Osman was born in the Muharram Bey neighborhood of Alexandria on 28 November 1898. His father was a secretary general in the municipality of Alexandria.

Educated at Victoria College and then at Brasenose College, Oxford, Amin Osman was a judge by profession. He continued his studies in law in Paris.

== Career ==
Following his graduation Osman joined the ministry of finance in Cairo. He was a member of the Egyptian delegation led by the Prime Minister Mustafa El Nahas which signed the Anglo-Egyptian Treaty in August 1936. Osman adopted a pro-British political stance and was part of a group created by the British diplomats to control the Egyptian politics. He was the primary liaison between the Prime Ministers Mustafa El Nahas and then Mohammed Mahmoud Pasha and the British Embassy in Cairo. However, next Prime Minister Ali Maher Pasha fired Osman soon after he took over the office in August 1939. Osman was serving as the undersecretary of finance before his dismissal.

Osman's next post was the director of the National Bank of Egypt. Following the Wafd Party's formation of the government he was named as the head of the audit department of the finance ministry in February 1942. In a cabinet reshuffle dated 2 June 1943 he was appointed minister of finance to the cabinet led by Mustafa El Nahas and replaced Kamel Sidky Pasha in the post. It was the fifth cabined headed by Mustafa El Nahas. Osman served in the post until October 1944 when the cabinet was dissolved. Although Osman served in the Wafd cabinet, he was not a member of the party. Instead, he founded a political party entitled the Revival League after his term as finance minister ended.

== Personal life and assassination ==
Amin Osman married a British woman, Katie. They had a daughter.

He was assassinated in front of the Old Victorian Club on Sharia Adly in Cairo on the evening of 5 January 1946. He died shortly after the attack. The assassination was planned by the Egyptian army officers, including Anwar Sadat who would be the president of the country, and their target was also Prime Minister Mustafa El Nahas. When the assassins led by Hussein Tawfiq did not manage to kill Mustafa El Nahas on 26 December 1945, they targeted and murdered Amin Osman. Years later Anwar Sadat told these incidents in detail and argued that they murdered Osman due to the fact that the program of his party, the Revival League, emphasized the significance of the relationship between Egypt and Great Britain.

A funeral ceremony for Amin Osman was held on 6 January in Cairo, and he was buried in the tomb of Imam Al Shafi'i there. During his funeral the supporters of the Wafdist Party and university students protested the government demanding the resignation of the Prime Minister Mahmoud Fahmi Nokrashy.

Tawfik was arrested soon and based on his confession Anwar Sadat, Mohammed Ibrahim Kamel, and others were also arrested and jailed. Of them Sadat was released from the prison in 1948.

=== Awards ===
Osman was the recipient of the Order of the British Empire which was awarded as a result of his contributions in the sign of the Anglo-Egyptian Treaty in 1936.
