= Gabriel Warburg =

German-Israeli historian (born 1927)

Gabriel R. Warburg (born 1927) is a German-Israeli historian specialising in the modern history of Sudan and Egypt.

== Life and career ==
Warburg was born in 1927 in Berlin. In 1933, he emigrated with his family to Haifa, then under the British Mandate for Palestine. From 1946 to 1965, he was a member of Kibbutz Yehiam in northern Israel. He pursued higher education at the Hebrew University of Jerusalem between 1961 and 1964 and earned his Ph.D. from the School of Oriental and African Studies (SOAS), University of London, in 1968.

He held academic positions at the University of Haifa, where he served as rector from 1974 to 1977. He was also the director of the Israeli Academic Center in Cairo between 1984 and 1987. He was a fellow at the Berlin Institute for Advanced Study during the 1991/1992 academic year, where he worked on the project "Religion and State in the Sudan in the 19th and 20th Centuries."

Warburg's research focuses on the interplay of Islam, nationalism, and politics in Sudan and Egypt. Among his notable publications are: The Sudan Under Wingate: Administration in the Anglo-Egyptian Sudan (1899–1916) (1971), Islam, Nationalism and Communism in a Traditional Society: The Case of Sudan (1978), Egypt and the Sudan: Studies in History and Politics (1985) and Islam, Sectarianism and Politics in Sudan Since the Mahdiyya (2003).
