= Saadist Institutional Party =

Saadist Institutional Party حزب الهيئة السعدية
- President: Ahmad Maher Pasha
- Founded: January 4, 1938
- Dissolved: January 17, 1953
- Split from: Wafd Party
- Headquarters: Cairo
- Ideology: Royalism; Liberalism
- Political position: Centre
- Colours: Purple

The Saadist Institutional Party (Arabic: حزب الهيئة السعدية) was an Egyptian political party. It was established in 1938 as a split-off from the Wafd party by former Wafdists Ahmed Maher Pasha and Mahmoud Fahmy el-Nokrashy Pasha. Ibrahim Abdel Hady Pasha later became president following the assassinations of the two founders.

== History ==
The Wafd party was founded by Saad Zaghloul in 1919 and was the main political force during the 1919 Egyptian revolution. Following the death of Zaghloul, Mustafa al-Nahhas became the new party leader. al-Nahhas, Makram Ebeid, Ahmed Maher and Mahmoud el-Nokrasky were the core four main leaders of the party after Zaghloul's death. However, the latter two were expelled from the party following a contracting dispute over a plan to electrify the Aswan Dam. On 4 January 1938, they founded the Saadist party, named after the late founder of the Wafd. The party did well in the 1938 Egyptian parliamentary election, acquiring a number of deputies and local committees. The party was typically urban in makeup; members of the committees were part of the local nascent bourgeoisie, such as merchants, industrialists and financiers. The party supported increased government aid to local Egyptian industry, such as the Federation of Industries, and tariffs to defend the Egyptian cotton industry, as well as Bank Misr.

The party program was published on 15 June 1939 in al-Dustur. The administrative board contained 27 members other than the president and vice president from the Saadist members of parliament. 21 were elected by the general assembly of the party and the other six were co-opted, a third of which were to be annually replaced. The general assembly of the party were active members who paid an entrance fee and an annual subscription, while associate members only paid lower membership fees. In general, the party was a parliamentary cadre party with branches of notables, rather than a mass party. Outside of Mahir and el-Nokrasky, Abd al-Razzaq al-Sanhuri and Abbas Mahmud al-Aqqad were also members. It stood out during World War II as the only party to advocate Egypt's direct involvement in the conflict with a declaration of war against Italy. Following the party's victory in the 1945 elections, now prime minister Ahmed Maher fulfilled that promise with a declaration of war against the Axis, a decision which cost him his life as he was assassinated by an Egyptian nationalist for this action. In general, the party had a more moderate opinion regarding negotiations with the United Kingdom than the Wafd, as Maher's successor as prime minister el-Nokrasky was reluctant to confront the UK in negotiations after the war's end, only doing so following intense pressure in the 1946 Egyptian protests.

Following the 1952 Egyptian revolution, the Free Officers demanded that the pre-revolutionary parties purge themselves of corrupt members. The Saadists formed a new secretariat under Mahmud Ghalib. The Saadist Ibrahim Abdel Hady was placed on trial in a revolutionary court and was sentenced to death, later commuted to life imprisonment. It was dissolved along all other parties on 17 January 1953 following the 1952 Egyptian revolution.

== Electoral history ==
=== Chamber of Deputies elections ===
Election	Party leader	Seats	+/–	Position
1938	Ahmed Maher	87 / 264	▲87	▲2nd
1942	Ahmed Maher	1 / 264	▼86	▼4th
1945	Ahmed Maher	125 / 264	▲124	▲1st
1950	Ibrahim Abdel Hady Pasha	28 / 319	▼97	▼2nd

== Sources ==
- Deeb, Marius (1979). Party Politics in Egypt: the Wafd & its rivals 1919–1939. Ithaca Press : London: The Middle East Centre St Antony’s College Oxford. ISBN 9780903729406.
- Khatib, M.F. (1954). The working of parliamentary institutions in Egypt, 1924-1952 (Thesis). University of Edinburgh.
- Tachau, Frank (1994). Political Parties of the Middle East and North Africa (1st ed.). Greenwood. pp. 122–123. ISBN 978-0313266492.
