= Ahmad Maher Pasha =

Prime Minister of Egypt (1944–1945)

Ahmad Maher Pasha Pasha
- أحمد ماهر باشا
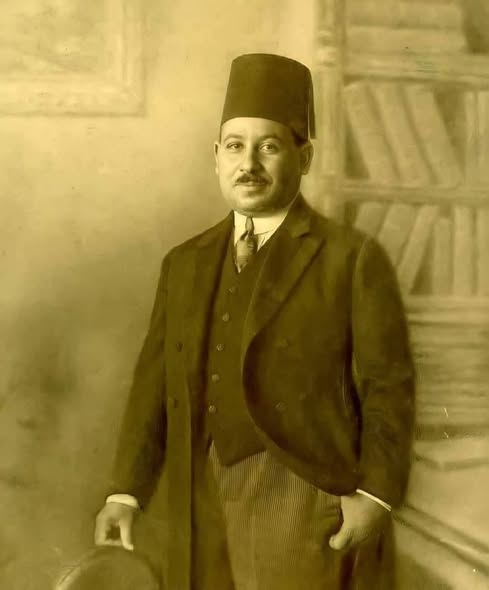

26th Prime Minister of Egypt
- In office 10 October 1944 – 24 February 1945
- Monarch: Farouk of Egypt
- Preceded by: Mostafa el-Nahas
- Succeeded by: Mahmoud El Nokrashy Pasha

Personal details
- Born: 1885
- Died: 24 February 1945 (aged 59–60)
- Party: Saadist Institutional Party
- Other political affiliations: Wafd Party

Ahmad Maher Pasha (Note: Also spelt Ahmad Mahir) (1885/6 (Note: Goldschmidt (2003) puts his year of birth as 1885, while Long (2005) puts it at 1886)– 24 February 1945) (Arabic: أحمد ماهر باشا) was an Egyptian politician from the Saadist Institutional Party who served as Prime Minister of Egypt from October 1944 to February 1945. He was the younger brother of Aly Maher, and the grandfather of the diplomats Ahmed Maher El Sayed and Ali Maher.

Maher was born in the Abbasiyya district of Cairo. He was the son of Muhammad Mahir, a former Under-Secretary of State for War and Governor of Cairo, and was of Circassian origin. He attended Montpellier University where he earned a license en droit, later teaching at law school, what became Cairo University. He later became involved in the Wafd party during the 1919 Egyptian Revolution. After rivals of the Wafd formed the Liberal Constitutional Party, two of its members were assassinated because they were mistaken for party founders, Adly Pasha and Husayn Rushdi. Maher was arrested for this crime but then released shortly afterwards. He then became Minister of Education under the government of Sa'ad Zaghloul. He had to resign after being implicated in the assassination of Sir Lee Stack, but was later acquitted in June 1926 alongside fellow Wafdist Mahmoud El Nokrashy. Despite his acquittal, the British were still wary of Maher. He became president of the Comptabilité Committée in parliament following the 1926 Egyptian elections and was a member of the Wafd High Command in 1927, 1932 and 1935. He was also a signatory to the 1936 Anglo-Egyptian Treaty in his capacity of president of the Chamber of Deputies.

In 1937, Maher and Nokrashy left the Wafd party to form the Saadist party. After the 1938 Egyptian parliamentary election Maher became Minister of Finance. He was the prime minister from 10 October 1944 to 24 February 1945. He was appointed upon the removal of Mustafa an-Nahhas Pasha by King Farouk of Egypt.

Maher consistently supported the Allies during World War II. He argued that joining the war would give the Egyptian Army vital combat experience it had lacked since the era of Muhammad Ali, and that this deficiency was the pretext Britain used to justify keeping its forces in Egypt as guardians of the Suez Canal.

== Early life and education ==
Maher graduated from the Faculty of Law in 1908 and practised as a lawyer for two years. In 1910 he travelled to Montpellier to study law and economics at Montpellier University for three years, earning a doctorate. After returning to Egypt he taught from 1913 for eight years at the Higher School of Commerce, where he formed a close friendship with Nokrashy Pasha. The two men became associates under Saad Zaghloul and joined the secret network of Abd al-Rahman Fahmi.

== Political career ==
=== Minister of Education ===
Maher was elected to the Chamber of Deputies in 1924. Within months, Saad Zaghloul appointed him Minister of Education in October 1924. He was arrested in May 1925 and tried alongside Nokrashy in connection with political assassinations. Zaghloul formed a defence team headed by the lawyer Mustafa el-Nahas, who secured both men's acquittal in under a year.

He was re-elected to parliament and became chairman of the Budget and Accounts Committee. In August 1927 he represented Egypt at the International Parliamentary Conference in Rio de Janeiro, but returned immediately upon learning of Zaghloul's death.

He became director of the Wafdist newspaper Al-Balagh and was re-elected as a deputy in 1930, accompanying the Egyptian Wafd delegation to treaty negotiations that year as a financial expert. He took over the editorship of the Wafdist newspaper Kawkab al-Sharq in 1934. He was elected deputy and then Speaker of the Chamber of Deputies in May 1936 and served as a member of the treaty negotiation delegation and the Montreux Conference delegation.

=== Split from the Wafd ===
After the death of Saad Zaghloul, Maher and Nokrashy believed they had a stronger claim to the party secretaryship than Makram Ebeid, given their earlier ties to Zaghloul and their roles in the secret resistance that had repeatedly put their lives at risk. The competition between Maher and Nokrashy on one side and al-Nahhas and Makram on the other foreshadowed the split that occurred between 1937 and 1938, when Maher, Galeb, and Nokrashy left with a group of young Wafdists to form the Saadist body.

In 1937, Maher and Nokrashy left the Wafd party to form the Saadist Institutional Party. After the 1938 Egyptian parliamentary election Maher became Minister of Finance.

=== Prime Minister ===
He was the prime minister from 10 October 1944 to 24 February 1945, serving two consecutive terms. He was appointed upon the removal of Mustafa an-Nahhas Pasha by King Farouk of Egypt. After taking office he called for new elections and sought a legal ruling against members of the Muslim Brotherhood standing as candidates. He then moved to declare war on the Axis powers, with Egypt entering World War II in its final stages in order to secure Egyptian representation at the post-war peace conference.

==== First cabinet (8 October 1944 – 15 January 1945) ====
Minister	Portfolio
Ibrahim Abd al-Hadi	Public Health
Ibrahim Dessouki Abaza	Communications
Ahmad Abd al-Ghaffar Pasha	Agriculture
Ahmad Maher Pasha	Interior
al-Sayyid Salim	National Defence
Hafiz Ramadan Pasha	Justice
Raghib Hanna Bey	Commerce and Industry
Taha Muhammad Abd al-Wahhab al-Sibai Bey	Supply
Muhammad Husayn Haykal	Social Affairs; Public Education
Mahmoud Ghalib Pasha	Public Works
Mahmoud El Nokrashy Pasha	Foreign Affairs
Mustafa Abd al-Raziq	Awqaf (Religious Endowments)
Makram Ebeid	Finance

==== Second cabinet (15 January 1945 – 24 February 1945) ====
Minister	Portfolio
Ibrahim Abd al-Hadi	Public Health
Ibrahim Dessouki Abaza	Communications
Ahmad Abd al-Ghaffar Pasha	Agriculture
Ahmad Maher Pasha	Interior
al-Sayyid Salim	National Defence
Hafiz Ramadan Pasha	Justice
Hafni Mahmoud Bey	Commerce and Industry
Raghib Hanna Bey	Minister of State
Taha Muhammad Abd al-Wahhab al-Sibai Bey	Supply
Abd al-Razzaq al-Sanhuri	Public Education
Abd al-Majid Badr Bey	Social Affairs
Mahmoud Ghalib Pasha	Public Works
Mahmoud El Nokrashy Pasha	Foreign Affairs
Mustafa Abd al-Raziq	Awqaf (Religious Endowments)
Makram Ebeid	Finance

== Assassination ==
While Prime Minister, he declared war against the Axis powers in World War II on 24 February 1945. On that day, the Egyptian parliament held a session to vote on declaring war on the Axis and joining the United Nations. Maher first held a closed session with the Chamber of Deputies to explain what Egypt stood to gain from a formal declaration. Having secured near-unanimous approval, he moved to proceed to the Senate, located a short distance away. As he crossed the Pharaonic hall connecting the two chambers, a young man named Mahmud Issawi shot and killed him on the spot.

Following the assassination, Hassan al-Banna, Ahmad al-Sukkari, Abd al-Hakim Abdin, and other leaders of the Muslim Brotherhood were arrested, as Issawi was believed to be a member. They were released within days after Issawi confessed to membership of the National Party and stated he had acted to prevent Egypt from entering the war alongside Britain. Other sources identify Issawi as a trainee lawyer working in the office of Abd al-Rahman al-Rafi'i.

In later years, evidence emerged linking Issawi to the Muslim Brotherhood's secret apparatus. In his memoirs, Sheikh Ahmad Hasan al-Baquri wrote that the special apparatus had decided to seek revenge for the Brotherhood's candidate being defeated in elections in the Ismailia constituency, and that Issawi was directed by the apparatus to attack Maher at the moment he declared war on the Axis.

Issawi was found guilty of murder and sentenced to death by hanging. However, he died while on a hunger strike on death row on 23 August 1945.

== Sources ==
- Goldschmidt Jr., Arthur (2003). "MAHIR, AHMAD (1885–1945)". Historical Dictionary of Egypt (5th ed.). Scarecrow Press. pp. 247–248. ISBN 978-0-8108-6586-0.
- Long, Richard (2005). "Appendix 2: Egyptian personalities". British Pro-Consuls in Egypt, 1914-1929 : The Challenge of Nationalism. RoutledgeCurzon. pp. 185–186.
- Badrawi, Malak (2013) [2000]. Political Violence in Egypt 1910-1924: Secret Societies, Plots and Assassinations. Routledge.
- Terry, Janice J. (1982). The Wafd: Cornerstone of Egyptian Political Power. Publisher: Third World Centre for Research and Publishing. ISBN 9780861990009.
- Reid, Donald M. (1982). "Political Assassination in Egypt, 1910-1954". The International Journal of African Historical Studies. 15 (4): 625–651. doi:10.2307/217848.
- Deeb, Marius (1979). Party Politics in Egypt: the Wafd & its rivals 1919–1939. Ithaca Press. ISBN 9780903729406.
- Quraishi, Zaheer M. (1967). Liberal Nationalism in Egypt; Rise and Fall of the Wafd Party. Jamal Printing Press. ISBN 9780861990009.
- Marsot, Afaf Lutfi (1977). Egypt's Liberal Experiment: 1922–1936. University of California Press. ISBN 9780520031098.

Political offices
Preceded by Mostafa en-Nahhas Pasha	Prime Minister of Egypt; 1944–1945	Succeeded by Mahmoud en-Nokrashy Pasha
