= Unilateral Declaration of Egyptian Independence =

1922 British legal instrument

- Created: 28 February 1922
- Commissioned by: United Kingdom
- Purpose: To recognize Egypt as an independent state

The Unilateral Declaration of Egyptian Independence on 28 February 1922 was the formal legal instrument by which the United Kingdom recognised Egypt as an independent sovereign state.

According to the official British archives, Egypt became an independent state after the issuance of the declaration of February 28, 1922, however four key limits were placed on Egyptian independence, which were only removed in the Anglo-Egyptian treaty of 1936.

== Background ==
The status of Egypt had become highly convoluted ever since its virtual breakaway from the Ottoman Empire in 1805 under Muhammad Ali Pasha. From then on, Egypt was de jure a self-governing vassal state of the Ottoman Empire, but de facto independent, with its own hereditary monarchy, military, currency, legal system, and empire in Sudan. From 1882 onwards, Egypt was occupied by the United Kingdom, but not annexed, leading to a unique situation of a country that was legally a vassal of the Ottoman Empire whilst having almost all the attributes of statehood, but in reality being governed by the United Kingdom in what was known as a "veiled protectorate".

In the unilateral declaration, the United Kingdom granted to itself "reserved" powers in four areas central to the governance of Egypt: foreign relations, communications, the military, and Sudan, which was legally a condominium of both Egypt and the United Kingdom. These reserved powers, to which the Egyptian government did not consent, meant that nationalist grievances against the United Kingdom continued and would contribute to the causes of the Egyptian Revolution of 1952 three decades later. According to historian Caroline Elkins, the Egyptian independence declaration did not entail sovereignty for Egypt, but rather a "semiautonomous" status.

In 1914, the legal fiction of Ottoman sovereignty was ended, and the Sultanate of Egypt was established, marking the first time since the Mamluk Sultanate an Egyptian state existed, but now smaller and with Anglo-Egyptian Sudan, Egypt was not legally a sovereign state. Though the United Kingdom did not annex Egypt, it made the restored sultanate a protectorate (a state not part of the British Empire but nonetheless within the sphere of influence of the United Kingdom), thereby formalising the political and military role that it had exercised in Egypt since 1882. The continued control of Egypt's foreign affairs by the United Kingdom, as well as British repression of Egyptians who pushed for a more complete independence, sparked the Egyptian Revolution of 1919. Subsequently, the British government entered into negotiations intended to abate Egyptian grievances whilst maintaining its own military presence and political influence in the country.

Although it met the Egyptian nationalists' immediate demands for an end to the protectorate, the declaration was globally unsatisfactory, since the Egyptian independence that the United Kingdom recognised was greatly restricted by the "reserved points" clause, as later recognized in the Egyptian Constitution of 1923. This led to sustained pressure on the United Kingdom from Egyptian nationalists to renegotiate the relationship between the two countries. The Anglo-Egyptian treaty of 1936 resolved some of these issues, but others, particularly regarding Sudan, and the presence of British military personnel in the Suez Canal Zone, remained.

The declaration was preceded by a period of inconclusive negotiations between the governments of Egypt and the United Kingdom. Areas of disagreement included Egypt's position on the issues of the protectorate, and of its future role in Sudan. Egyptian Prime Minister Adli Yakan Pasha, and moderate Egyptian nationalists managed to obtain the agreement of British High Commissioner Edmund Allenby to secure the more general issue of Egyptian sovereignty with a view to the United Kingdom ultimately recognising Egypt as an independent state. The Coalition Government of British Prime Minister David Lloyd George wanted to maintain the protectorate over Egypt. Allenby threatened to resign, and this action brought the issue to public discussion, and led to a quick official response: two weeks later the declaration was issued.

== Text ==
The following text was first published in 1922. As a result, it is currently in the public domain in the United States, as well as in the United Kingdom where its Crown copyright has expired.

Declaration to Egypt by His Britannic Majesty's Government (February 28, 1922)

Whereas His Majesty's Government, in accordance with their declared intentions, desire forthwith to recognise Egypt as an independent sovereign State; and

Whereas the relations between His Majesty's Government and Egypt are of vital interest to the British Empire;

The following principles are hereby declared:

1. The British Protectorate over Egypt is terminated, and Egypt is declared to be an independent sovereign State.

2. So soon as the Government of His Highness shall pass an Act of Indemnity with application to all inhabitants of Egypt, martial law as proclaimed on 2 November 1914, shall be withdrawn.

3. The following matters are absolutely reserved to the discretion of His Majesty's Government until such time as it may be possible by free discussion and friendly accommodation on both sides to conclude agreements in regard thereto between His Majesty's Government and the Government of Egypt:

(a) The security of the communications of the British Empire in Egypt;
(b) The defence of Egypt against all foreign aggression or interference, direct or indirect;
(c) The protection of foreign interests in Egypt and the protection of minorities;
(d) The Soudan.

Pending the conclusion of such agreements, status quo in all these matters shall remain intact.
