= 1950 Egyptian parliamentary election =

- 3 January 1950 (first stage); 10 January 1950 (second stage)
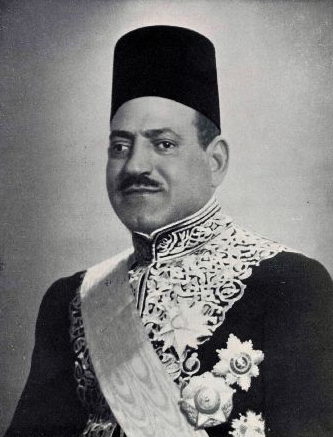

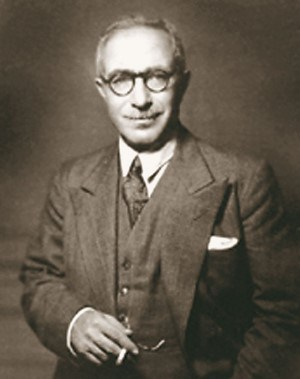

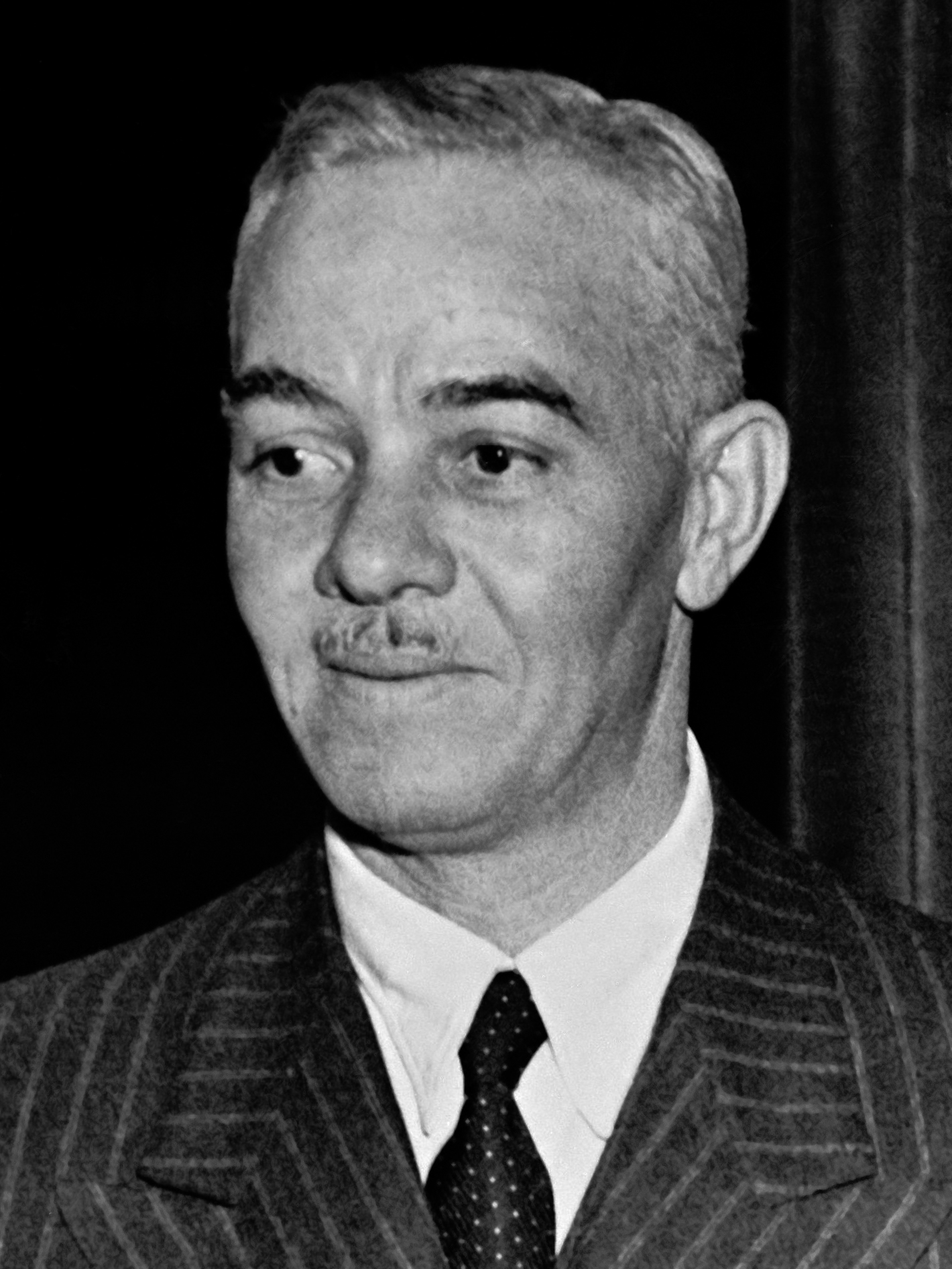
| | First party | Second party | Third party |
|---|---|---|---|
| Leader | Mostafa el-Nahas | Mohammed Hussein Heikal | Ibrahim Abdel Hady Pasha |
| Party | Wafd Party | Liberal Constitutional | Saadist |
| Seats won | 226 | 27 | 28 |
Prime Minister before election
Hussein Sirri Pasha
Independent
Subsequent Prime Minister
Mostafa el-Nahas
Wafd

Parliamentary elections were held in Egypt on 3 January 1950, with a second round on 10 January. The result was a victory for the Wafd Party. They were the last parliamentary elections that took place under the monarchy, and the last genuinely contested legislative election in Egypt until the election following the Revolution of 2011.

== Results ==
While all sources agree that the Wafd achieved a majority of seats, there are disagreements on the figures. Nohen et al and Dolf Sternberger et al puts the numbers as 225 Wafd, 28 Saadist, 26 Liberal Constitutionalist, 6 Nationalists, 1 Democratic Socialist and 33 independents, though the latter notes that a different source disagrees on one seat, 226 Wafd and 32 independents. P. J. Vatikiotis gave the totals as 288 to the Wafd out of 327 seats, polling at barely 40 percent of the votes, as well as 38 independents, with 2.8 million total votes cast out of 4.1 million voters. Both the Annual Register and Joel Gordon gives the same figures as Khatib except for the Wafdist deputies - 228. The Political Handbook and Atlas of the World gives the numbers as 218 Wafd seats and 39 independents but otherwise agrees with Khatib. An article by Moshe Pearlmann in 1950, citing al-Ahram, gives the numbers as: the Wafd at 228 seats with and 1,090,000 votes (44% of the total), independents at 30 seats with about 500,000 votes, the Sa'adists with 28 seats and 428,000 votes, the Liberal-Constitutionalists at 26 seats and 303,000 votes, the National party at 6 seats and the socialists, formerly Young Egypt, with one seat and 7,000 votes.

| Party | Votes | % | Seats |
|---|---|---|---|
| Wafd Party | 1,357,206 | 54.56 | 226 |
| Saadist Institutional Party | 406,693 | 16.35 | 28 |
| Liberal Constitutional Party | 292,444 | 11.76 | 27 |
| National Party | 37,512 | 1.51 | 6 |
| Socialist Party | 16,499 | 0.66 | 1 |
| Wafdist Block | 14,803 | 0.60 | 0 |
| Independents | 362,587 | 14.57 | 31 |
| Total | 2,487,744 | 100.00 | 319 |
| Total votes | 2,496,208 | – | |
| Registered voters/turnout | 4,126,879 | 60.49 | |
Source: Khatib

== Aftermath ==
Parliament sat on 16 January 1950 and was dissolved on 24 March 1952.

== Sources ==
- Khatib, M.F. (1954). The working of parliamentary institutions in Egypt, 1924-1952 (Thesis). University of Edinburgh.
- Sternberger, Dolf; Vogel, Bernhard; Nohlen, Dieter; Landfried, Klaus, eds. (1978). Die Wahl Der Parlamente Und Anderer Staatsorgane: Ein Handbuch (in German). Walter de Gruyter GmbH.
- Ries, Matthias (1999). Nohlen, Dieter; Krennerich, Michael; Thibaut, Bernhard (eds.). Elections in Africa: A Data Handbook. Oxford University Press.
- Vatikiotis, P. J. (1991). The History of Modern Egypt: From Muhammad Ali to Mubarak (4th ed.). Baltimore: Johns Hopkins University Press.
