= Anglo-Egyptian treaty of 1936 =

1936 defence pact between the UK and Egypt

Anglo-Egyptian Treaty of 1936
- Type: Bilateral treaty
- Signed: 26 August 1936
- Location: London, England, UK
- Original signatories: United Kingdom; Egypt
- Ratifiers: United Kingdom; Egypt

Anglo-Egyptian treaty of 1936

The Anglo-Egyptian Treaty of 1936 (officially, The Treaty of Alliance Between His Majesty, in Respect of the United Kingdom, and His Majesty, the King of Egypt) was a treaty signed between the United Kingdom and the Kingdom of Egypt. The treaty significantly reduced Britain's influence in Egypt's domestic policy but Britain still had significant influence in Egypt's foreign policy and defence, especially the Suez Canal.

Under the terms of the treaty, the United Kingdom was required to withdraw all its troops from Egypt, except those necessary to protect the Suez Canal and its surroundings, numbering 10,000 troops plus auxiliary personnel. Additionally, the United Kingdom would supply and train the Egyptian Army and assist in its defence in case of war. The treaty was to last for 20 years; it was negotiated in the Zaafarana palace, signed in London on 26 August 1936 and ratified on 22 December. It was registered in the League of Nations Treaty Series on 6 January 1937.

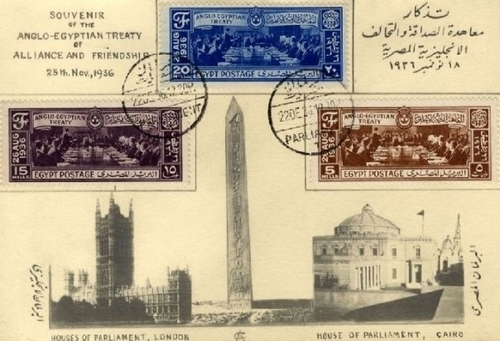
Anglo-Egyptian Treaty of 1936

== Background ==
In November 1918, seven prominent Egyptians from the landed gentry and the legal profession, including Sa'd Zaghlul, formed a delegation, or Wafd, whose chief goal was the complete independence of Egypt from British rule. But when the Wafd asked the British High Commissioner in Egypt if they could represent the country at the 1919 Paris Peace Conference, he refused. As a result, the delegation organisers took their message of independence to the people of Egypt and this led to the founding of one of the most popular political parties in modern Egyptian history.

In 1922 to ease political tensions the British government unilaterally declared Egypt independent, however under the declaration four key areas were reserved to Britain, thus limiting Egypt's independence.

Wafdist leaders thought that the ideas of independence and constitutional government were closely related and they had someone to model themselves after - the British. Following the proclamation of the Egyptian Constitution of 1923 the 1923–24 Egyptian parliamentary elections were held. Many European-educated Egyptians believed that the mere existence of a constitution and a parliament would legitimize Egyptian claims for complete independence.

But Egyptian democratic independence ran into many obstacles; the nature of the constitution gave many powers to the king, including the power to dissolve parliament. So the king used this constitutional power to get rid of parliament when it went against his wishes, culminating in many periods of royal rule. The British also continued to meddle in Egyptian politics, and they did not allow for a fully independent political apparatus to develop. Also the Wafd party and other minor political parties never created a coalition to stand together against the British, instead they held each other in contempt. The result of these obstacles was a constant struggle for power between the British-backed King Fuad I, and the Wafd party that sought complete independence from the British.

The intense desire for real independence was only partially fulfilled in 1936, when Britain agreed to renegotiate the 1922 declaration of independence, because of Italian expansionism into Ethiopia in 1935.

Among the justifications for the treaty was the Second Italo-Abyssinian War, which had started in 1935. King Farouk feared that the Italians might invade Egypt or drag it into the fighting. The 1936 treaty did not resolve the question of Sudan, which, under the terms of the existing Anglo-Egyptian Condominium Agreement of 1899, stated that Sudan should be jointly governed by Egypt and Britain, but with real power remaining in British hands. With rising tension in Europe, the treaty expressly favoured maintaining the status quo. The treaty, however, was not welcomed by Egyptian nationalists like Young Egypt, who wanted full independence. It ignited a wave of demonstrations against the British and the Wafd Party, which had supported the treaty.

== Treaty signing ==
The Treaty was signed in the Locarno Room at the Foreign Office building in London on 27 August 1936. The principal signatories were Egyptian premier Nahas Pasha and British Foreign Secretary Anthony Eden.

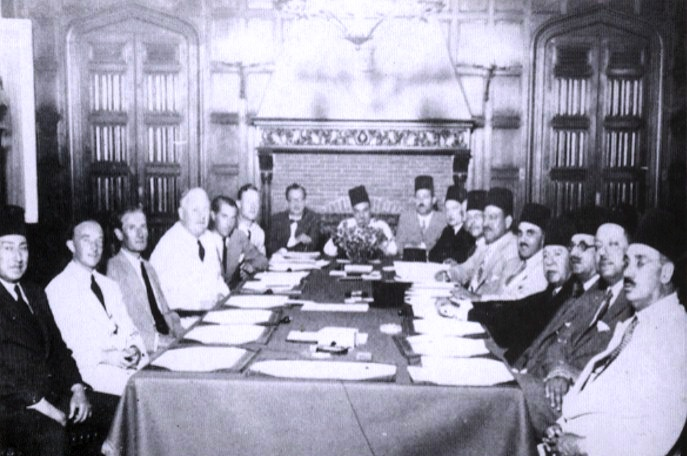
Second site of the negotiations in Alexandria, August 1936

Other signatories included Ramsay MacDonald, Mahmoud Pasha, Lord Halifax, Sir John Simon, Ismail Sidky Pasha, Makram Ebeid Pasha, Sir Miles Lampson and Amin Osman.

== Treaty provisions ==
- Removal of British military forces from the Egyptian cities to the Suez Canal area but British soldiers in Sudan remain unconditionally.
- The number of British troops in Egypt to number no more than 10 thousand soldiers and 400 pilots with the staff required for administrative and technical work in peacetime only, while during a state of war the UK has the right to increase the number.
- British forces are not transferred to new areas until new barracks are built.
- British troops remain in Alexandria eight years from the date of the Treaty
- British air forces remain in the camp in the Canal Zone and are entitled to use Egyptian air space and the same right is given to Egyptian aircraft.
- In case of war the Egyptian government is committed to provide all facilities and assistance to the British forces including the right to use Egyptian ports and airports and roads.
- After 20 years from the implementation of the Treaty parties it shall be determined if the presence of British troops is necessary as the Egyptian army may be able to guarantee shipping in the Suez Canal safely. Disagreements may be submitted to the League of Nations.
- Egypt has the right to demand the abolition of foreign privileges.
- Cancel all agreements and documents contrary to the provisions of this Treaty including the February 28 statement
- The return of the Egyptian army to Sudan and the recognition of joint management with Britain.
- Freedom of Egypt to make treaties with foreign countries, provided that these are not inconsistent with the provisions of this Treaty.
- Exchange ambassadors with the United Kingdom.

== Aftermath ==
On 23 September 1945, after the end of World War II, the Egyptian government demanded the modification of the treaty to terminate the British military presence, and also to allow the annexation of the Anglo-Egyptian Sudan. In 1946, Britain agreed to withdraw all remaining troops in Egypt into the Suez Canal Zone. In 1947, UK troops officially withdrew from all other Egyptian bases outside the Suez Canal Zone. Following the Wafd Party's victory in the boycotted Egyptian parliamentary election, 1950, the new Wafd government unilaterally abrogated the treaty on October 15th 1951. Three years later, and with new government leadership under Gamal Abdel Nasser, the UK agreed to withdraw its troops in the Anglo–Egyptian Agreement of 1954; the British withdrawal was completed in June 1956. This date is seen as when Egypt gained full independence, although Nasser had already established an independent foreign policy that caused tension with several Western powers.

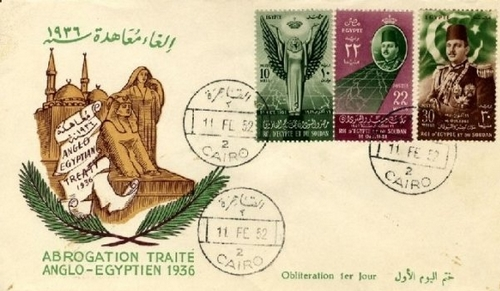
An Egyptian stamp issued for the abrogation of the treaty, February 1952

Following the abrupt withdrawal of an offer by Britain and the United States to fund the building of the Aswan Dam, Egypt nationalised the Suez Canal on 26 July 1956, ostensibly to pay for the dam, although in reality the Soviet Union provided most of the funding. The nationalization was technically in violation of the international agreement that Nasser had signed on 19 October 1954, although he agreed to pay compensation to the shareholders. Some months later, France, Israel and Britain colluded to overthrow Nasser, and the Suez Crisis ensued. After international pressure and threats from the 2 new superpowers (the United States and the USSR), Britain, France and Israel were all forced to withdraw from Egypt, and the canal remained under Egyptian control.

== Sources ==
General

- Anglo-Egyptian Treaty of 1936
- The Anglo – Egyptian Alliance Treaty 1936

Specific

- Cleveland, Bunton (2013). A History of the Modern Middle East. Boulder: Westview Press.
- Ibrahim, Hassan Ahmed (1976). The 1936 Anglo-Egyptian Treaty: An Historical Study with Special Reference to the Contemporary Situation in Egypt and the Sudan. Khartoum University Press.
- Ibrahim, Hassan Ahmed (1970). The Anglo-Egyptian treaty of 1936 with special reference to the contemporary situation in Egypt and the Sudan (Thesis). SOAS University of London. doi:10.25501/SOAS.00029241.
- Morewood, Steven (1996). "Appeasement from strength: The making of the 1936 Anglo-Egyptian treaty of friendship and alliance". Diplomacy & Statecraft. 7 (3): 530–562. doi:10.1080/09592299608406016.
- Morewood, Steven (2005). The British Defence of Egypt 1935–1940: Conflict and crisis in the Eastern Mediterranean. Frank Cass. ISBN 978-0714649436.
- Morsy, Laila (March 1984). "The Military Clauses of the Anglo–Egyptian Treaty of Friendship and Alliance, 1936". International Journal of Middle East Studies. 16 (1): 67–97. doi:10.1017/S0020743800027616. JSTOR 162941. Archived from the original on 2025-07-13.
