= Arthur Goldschmidt Jr. =

American scholar of Egyptian history

Arthur Goldschmidt Jr. is a historian of Egypt and professor emeritus of Middle East history at Pennsylvania State University. He graduated from Colby College and Harvard University.

== Selected publications ==
=== Articles and chapters ===
- “The Egyptian Nationalist Party, 1892–1919” in Political and Social Change in Modern Egypt, edited by P.M. Holt (Oxford University Press, 1968)
- “The Leader Muhammad Farid as Viewed by a Foreign Historian” (in Arabic), al-Musawwar, 14 November 1969
- “Historical Perspectives,” in The Middle East: Its Government and Politics, edited by Abid A. Al-Marayati and others (Duxbury Press, 1972)
- “Egyptian National Party from Spotlight to Shadow,” Journal of Asian and African Studies 16 (1982)
- “The 1906 Taba Affair,” al-Abhath 35 (1986)
- “Van Dyck, Cornelius” in American National Biography (1999)
- “Egypt’s 1952 Revolution” and “The United Arab Republic” in History in Dispute.

=== Books ===
- A Concise History of the Middle East (Westview Press, 1979, 1983, 1988, 1991, 1996, 1999, 2002, 2006 with Lawrence Davidson; AUC Press, 1983, 2004)
- Modern Egypt: The Formation of a Nation-State (Westview Press, 1988, 2004)
- Memoirs and Diaries of Muhammad Farid, an Egyptian Nationalist Leader (1868–1919) (Edwin Mellen Press, 1992)
- Historical Dictionary of Egypt, 2nd ed. (Scarecrow Press, 1994); 3rd ed. with Robert Johnston (Scarecrow Press, 2003; AUC Press, 2004)
- 71 entries in Encyclopedia of the Modern Middle East (Macmillan, 1996, 2004)
- Biographical Dictionary of Modern Egypt (Lynne Rienner Publishers, 2000)
- History chapter in Understanding the Contemporary Middle East, edited by Deborah Gerner (Lynne Rienner Publishers, 2000, revised 2003, revised 2008)
- Editor and contributor, Re-Envisioning Egypt, 1919–1952 (AUC Press, 2005)
- Brief History of Egypt (Facts on File, 2008)
- Series editor, Creation of the Modern Middle East Series (Chelsea House, 2008)
