= Mahmoud El Nokrashy Pasha =

Prime Minister of Egypt (1945–1946, 1946–1948)

- محمود فهمى النقراشى باشا
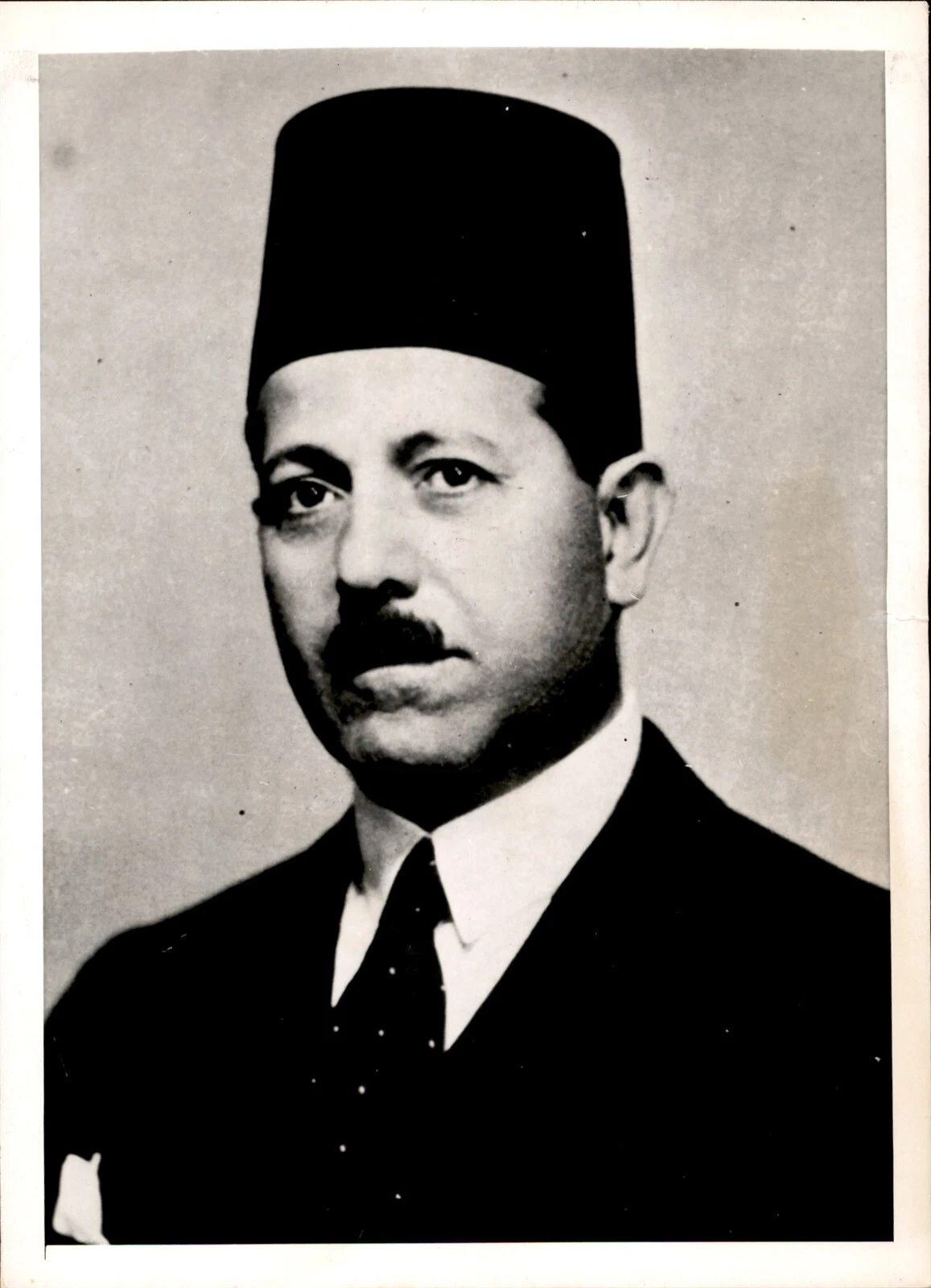

27th Prime Minister of Egypt
- In office 9 December 1946 – 28 December 1948
- Monarch: King Farouk
- Preceded by: Ismail Sidqi Pasha
- Succeeded by: Ibrahim Abdel Hadi Pasha
- In office 26 February 1945 – 17 February 1946
- Monarch: King Farouk
- Preceded by: Ahmad Mahir Pasha
- Succeeded by: Ismail Sidqi Pasha

Personal details
- Born: 26 April 1888 Egypt
- Died: 28 December 1948 (aged 60) Cairo, Egypt
- Party: Saadist Institutional Party

Mahmoud Fahmy El Nokrashy Pasha (Note: "Mahmoud" sometimes spelt Mahmud. "Fahmy" sometimes spelt "Fahmi". "El Nokrashy" sometimes spelt "al-Nuqrashi" or "an Nuqrashy".) (26 April 1888 – 28 December 1948) (Arabic: محمود فهمى النقراشى باشا, IPA: [mæħˈmuːd ˈfæhmi (e)nnoʔˈrɑːʃi ˈbæːʃæ]) was an Egyptian political figure. He was the twenty-seventh prime minister of the Kingdom of Egypt.

== Early life and education ==
Nokrashy was born in Alexandria on 26 April 1888 to a middle-class family. His father was an Egyptian accountant from Nuqrash in Delta, and his mother, Hanifa was a Sunni Muslim who migrated from Greece during the Ottoman Empire. Nokrashy was a graduate of the Ras Al Tin high school.

== Career ==
Nokrashy Pasha was a member of the Saadist Institutional Party (SIP) which supported a liberal monarchist programme. He was also a member of the secret apparatus of the Wafd Party, Egypt's then main nationalist party.

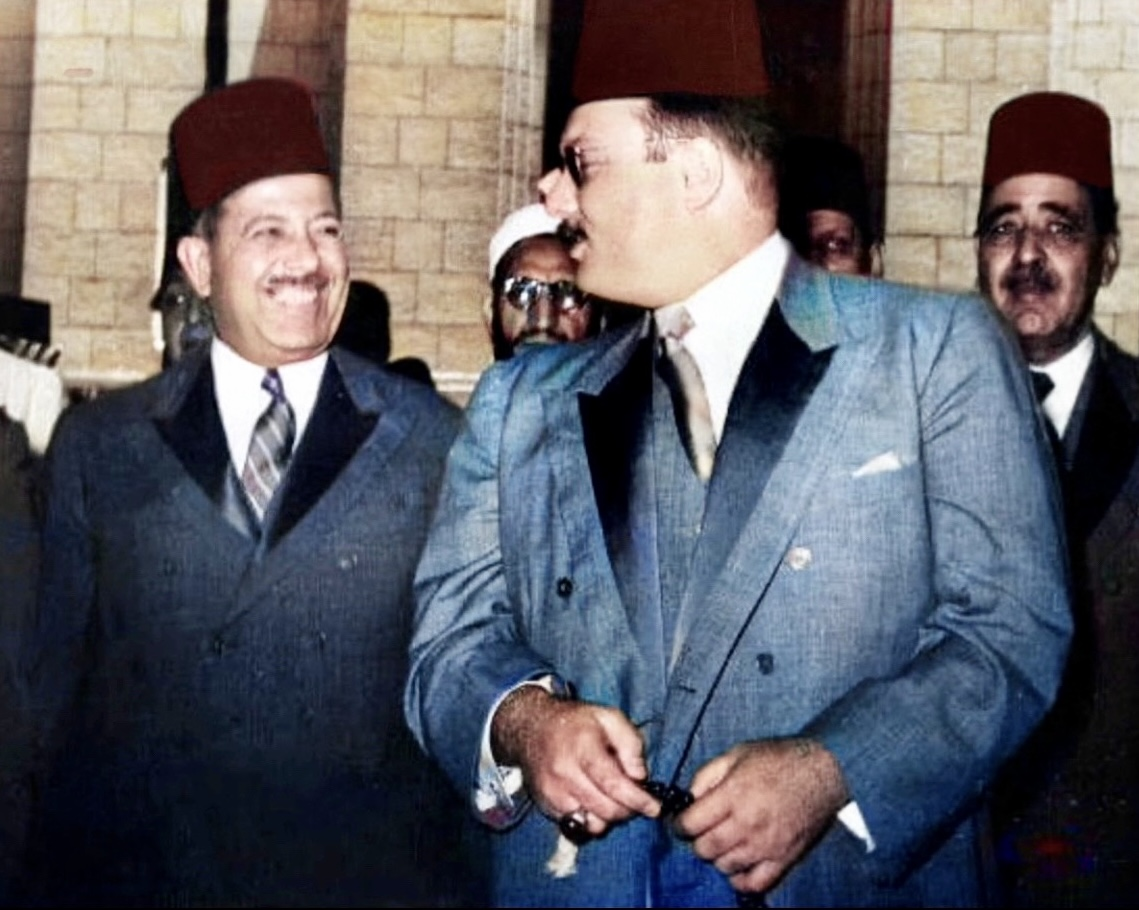
Nokrashy Pasha and King Farouk in an official visit, 1947

Nokrashy Pasha served as the prime minister of Egypt twice. His first term was from 1945 to 1946 (he initially came to power after the murder of Ahmad Mahir Pasha) and the second from 1946 to 1948. His second cabinet was a coalition government comprising members of the Saadist Institutional Party and the Liberal Constitutional Party.

In 1948, Nokrashy Pasha became very concerned with the assertiveness and popularity of the Muslim Brotherhood. Rumours of a Brotherhood coup against the monarchy and government had appeared, and the Brotherhood had already been implicated in the killing of Nokrashy Pasha's predecessor. Shortly after these rumours first gained currency, the prime minister formally outlawed the Brotherhood in December 1948, and this led directly to his own assassination. In addition to the Brotherhood being officially declared an illegal organization, the assets of the Brotherhood were seized by the government and many Brotherhood members went to prison.

== Assassination ==
Less than three weeks after these activities against the Brotherhood, Nokrashy Pasha was gunned down by Abdel Meguid Ahmed Hassan, who was a veterinary student at the University of King Fouad I and another member of the Brotherhood. The slaying occurred on 28 December 1948 at 10:00 am. Nokrashy Pasha was killed in the main building of the Ministry of Interior by Hassan, who was wearing the uniform of a lieutenant. Hassan shot him twice. This crime in turn led to the assassination (by the political police) of Muslim Brotherhood leader Hasan Al Banna on 12 February 1949: despite the fact that Banna had condemned the murder of the prime minister, and had publicly called it a terrorist act incompatible with Islam.

Hassan was arrested after the murder, and confessed that he was a member of the Brotherhood. He reported that it was the prime minister's decision to crack down upon the Brotherhood that had motivated him to carry out the shooting. Found guilty at his trial, he was soon afterwards hanged; three men who had knowingly helped him plan the assassination were sentenced to penal servitude for life.

== Notes ==
Political offices
Preceded by Ahmed Maher Pasha	Prime Minister of Egypt; 1945–1946	Succeeded by Ismail Sedky Pasha
Preceded by Ismail Sedky Pasha	Prime Minister of Egypt; 1946–1948	Succeeded by Ibrahim Abdel Hady Pasha
