= Wafd Party =

Former Egyptian center-right political party

Wafd Party حزب الوفد
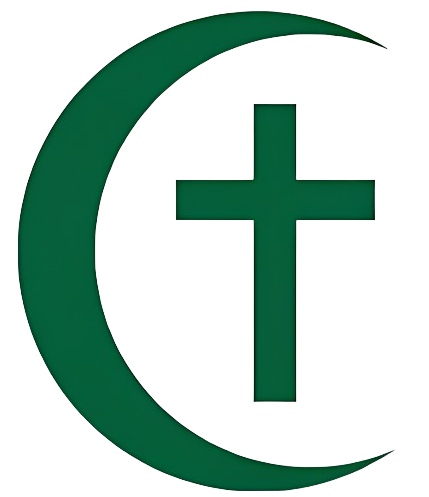
- Historical leaders: Saad Zaghlul Pasha (1919–1927); Mostafa el-Nahhas (1927–1953)
- Secretary-general: Makram Ebeid (1926–1942)
- Founder: Saad Zaghloul (most prominent)
- Founded: 1919
- Dissolved: January 1953
- Succeeded by: New Wafd Party
- Headquarters: Cairo
- Newspaper: Al Misri
- Youth wing: Blue Shirts
- Women's wing: Wafdist Women's Central Committee
- Ideology: Egyptian nationalism National liberalism Liberal conservatism
- Political position: Centre-right
- Colours: Green
- Slogan: "Justice is above power, and the nation is above the government" الحق فوق القوة والأمة فوق الحكومة
- Anthem: "Arise O' Egyptian!" قوم يا مصري

Party flag

The Wafd Party (Arabic: حزب الوفد, romanized: Ḥizb al-Wafd, lit. 'Delegation Party') was a nationalist liberal political party in Egypt. It was said to be Egypt's most popular and influential political party for a period from the end of World War I through the 1930s. During this time, it was instrumental in the development of the 1923 constitution, and supported moving Egypt from dynastic rule to a constitutional monarchy, where power would be wielded by a nationally-elected parliament. The party was dissolved in 1953, after the 1952 Egyptian revolution.

== History ==
=== Rise ===
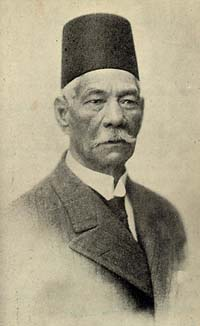
Saad Zahgloul, the party's founder and later Prime minister in 1924. He was the most prominent leader of the 1919 Egyptian revolution

The Wafd party was an Egyptian nationalist movement that came into existence in the aftermath of World War I. Although it was not the first nationalist group in Egypt, it had the longest lasting impact. It was preceded and influenced by smaller and less significant movements which evolved over time into the more modern and stronger nationalist Wafd Party. One of these earlier movements was the Urabi Revolt led by Ahmed Urabi in the early 1880s. This uprising fought against the ruling powers of the Egyptian Khedive and European interference with Egyptian affairs. Saad Zaghloul, the future creator and leader of the Wafd Party, was a follower of Urabi, and participated in the revolt.

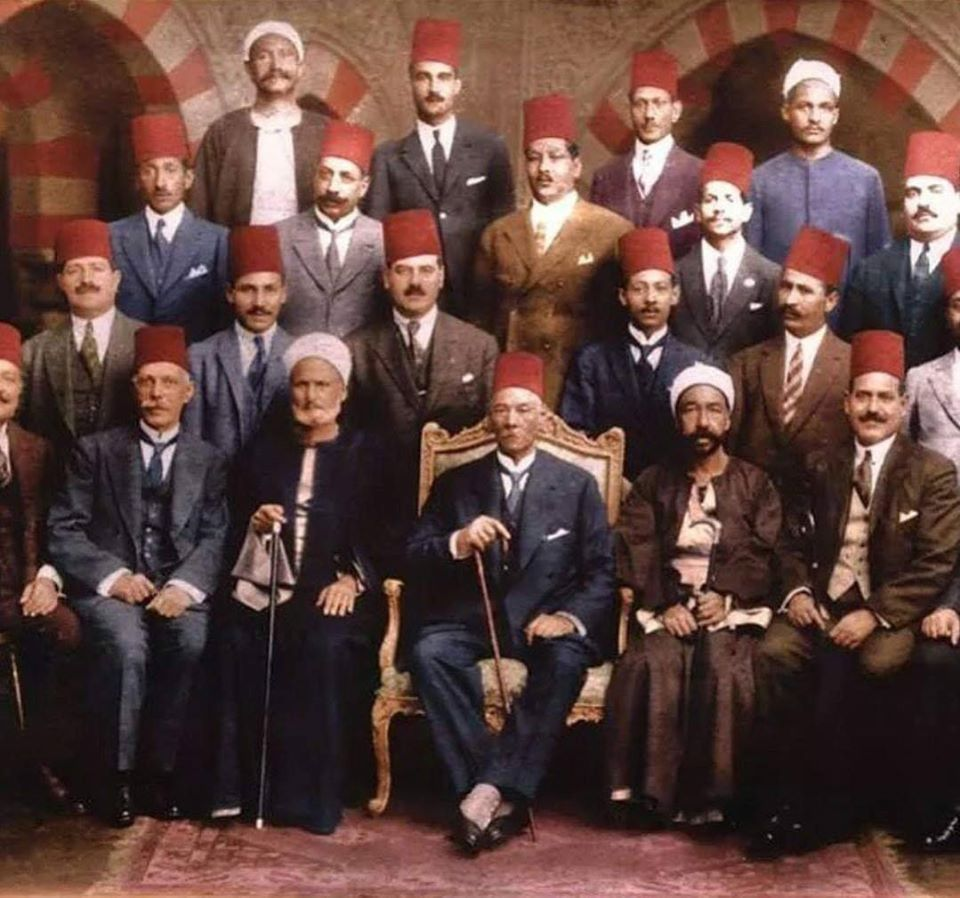
Saad Zaghloul Pasha with members of the Wafd Party.

The actual party began taking shape during World War I and was founded in November 1918. The original members included seven prominent figures of the Egyptian landed gentry and legal profession, including their leader Saad Zaghloul. They presented themselves with Zaghloul as their representative to Reginald Wingate, the British High Commissioner in Egypt and requested to represent Egypt at the Paris Peace Conference. They told Wingate that the main goal of the Wafd was the immediate termination of the British occupation of Egypt, but not of their intention to use the Paris Peace Conference to plead their case to the world powers. Zaghloul had created a delegation (or Wafd in Arabic) that involved representatives of most of the political and social groups of Egypt. Since it was full of so many different groups, it could not yet truly be considered a political party but more of a coalition. The Wafd had formed a constitution, outlining the ways that they wished to govern Egypt.

The Wafd was denied its request to go to London and speak with the home government, nor were they allowed to attend the Paris peace conference. The Wafd counteracted this by publishing memos and giving speeches ensuring that the delegations in Paris would know what the real Egyptian delegation desired. Zaghloul became a popular figure amongst the Egyptian public and was able to arouse popular discontent at Egyptian's continued status as a British protectorate. British authorities arrested Zaghloul and three other leaders and had them exiled to the island of Malta in 1919. These deportations caused the opposite effect to that the British had hoped, and though attempts were made to keep it quiet, word spread and eventually led to a strike of law students. This strike became a demonstration with chants including "Long live Saad! … Long live Independence!" This started the Egyptian Revolution of 1919, and in the following days many more began to strike and the government and courts shut down entirely. Several riots and other disturbances broke out over Egypt, which were gradually suppressed by the British. The British then released Saad Zaghloul and his followers, hoping to create a rift in the Wafd leadership. However, the party became more unified, and the strikes continued. The symbol used by the protesters was a crescent placed next to a cross on a plain green flag, Indicating the sense of national unity between Muslim and Christian Egyptians in facing the British occupation. And as the Wafd were seen as the revolution's party, the crescent and cross ultimately became the symbol of the Wafd.

The Wafd was now becoming a true party and one with widespread support of the people. The delegation made its way to Paris only to hear that U.S. President Woodrow Wilson supported the British Protectorate of Egypt. Although at this point the British were still in control, the Wafd was effectively leading the people of Egypt. In 1922, the British protectorate ended and the Wafd was placed in control of Egypt. The party rapidly became the dominant political organization in the country through most of the liberal period which came to an end with the rise of Gamal Abdel Nasser.

=== Government party ===
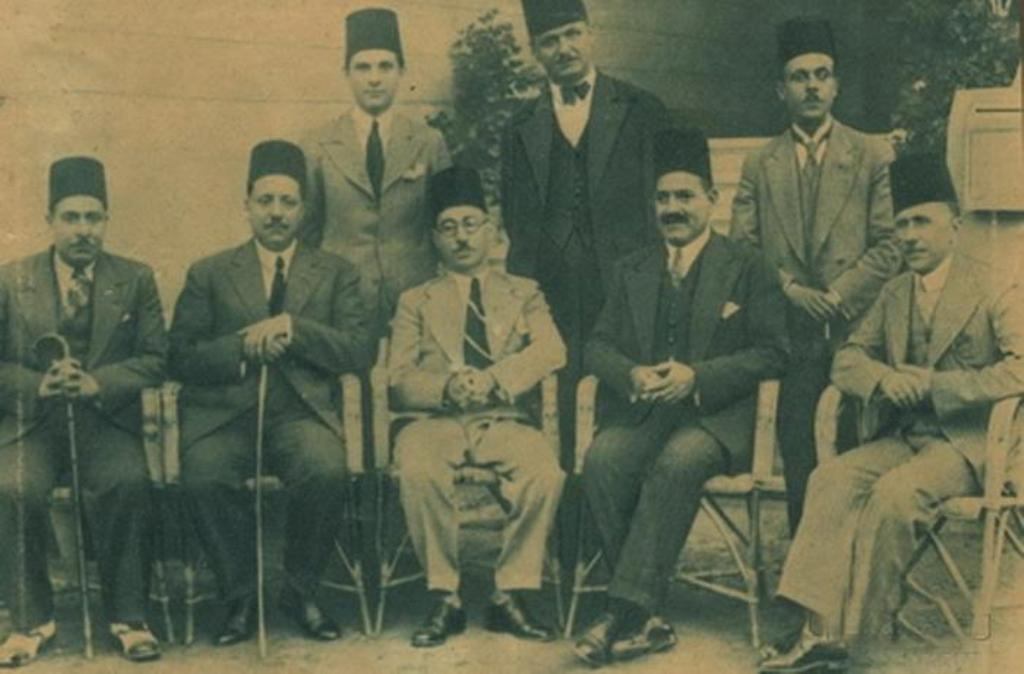
Party leader and Prime minister Mustafa El-Nahas Pasha with Secretary-general and Finance Minister Makram Ebeid Pasha, and other prominent cabinet and party members during his leadership.

The three-decade period between Britain's nominal exit in 1922 and the nationalist revolution of 1952 saw the erection of an uneasy balance of power between the King, the British Residency, and the Wafd leadership, of which the Wafd was the least powerful. In the fragile stability of this triangle, the Wafd became Egypt's preeminent political organization, described by contemporary historians as "the first in the field," "the best organized," and "the strongest numerically." In the 1924 parliamentary election the Wafd won 179 of 211 parliamentary seats. In 1936 it won 89% of the vote and 157 seats in Parliament.

However, ties between the Wafd and the two other axes of power – the King and the Residency – were strained by the party's raison d'être of opposing British intervention in Egypt and the King's collusion therein. King Fuad I's relations with the Wafd were described as "cool," and ties between the monarch and the largest political party further deteriorated after Fuad's son Farouk, who succeeded his father to the sultanate, signed an unduly quiescent treaty with the British in 1936. This alienated the party that had arisen primarily out of popular resentment of British control of Egypt and commanded popular support by associating itself most closely with the nationalist struggle for full Egyptian independence.

=== Decline ===
The power vacuum resulting from the end of the British mandate over Egypt also precipitated a severe welfare provision vacuum which the new government failed to fill. By the 1930s, Egypt became a top destination for Christian missionary organizations, which funded and performed badly needed social services for the Egyptian middle and lower classes. Western Proselytism consortia beseeched their sponsors "to make heavy sacrifices so that Egyptian children could have a better education than their own parents could afford"; likewise, the proliferation of missionary-operated hospitals exposed the inadequacy of government-provided healthcare.

Further social unrest resulted from the government's inability to resolve metastasizing labor disputes threatening the Egyptian economy. The twin occurrences of the worldwide recession prompted by the Great Depression and a regional cotton crisis slowed Egypt's GDP growth through the late 1920s and most of the following two decades. The consequent instability in the labor market motivated early attempts at widespread unionization. Sensing a threat to its unrivaled power, the Wafd implemented numerous local labor conciliation boards, which were essentially toothless owing to the dearth of labor laws on a national level. Though the Wafd secured guarantees of a permanent national labor council, no significant labor laws were enacted; those that did gain passage were not enforced; and the Wafd was unable to effect any substantial change in the fiercely anti-union policy of the government.

=== Failures of youth mobilization ===
During the 1920s, the party's leadership had placed very low emphasis on the recruitment and mobilization of youth. Complacent in its dominant parliamentary position, the Wafd did not pursue innovative methods of youth organization until at least the mid-1930s, leaving it hopelessly behind future competitors such as the Egyptian Muslim Brotherhood, which had employed a far more effective local-franchising system since its inception in 1928.

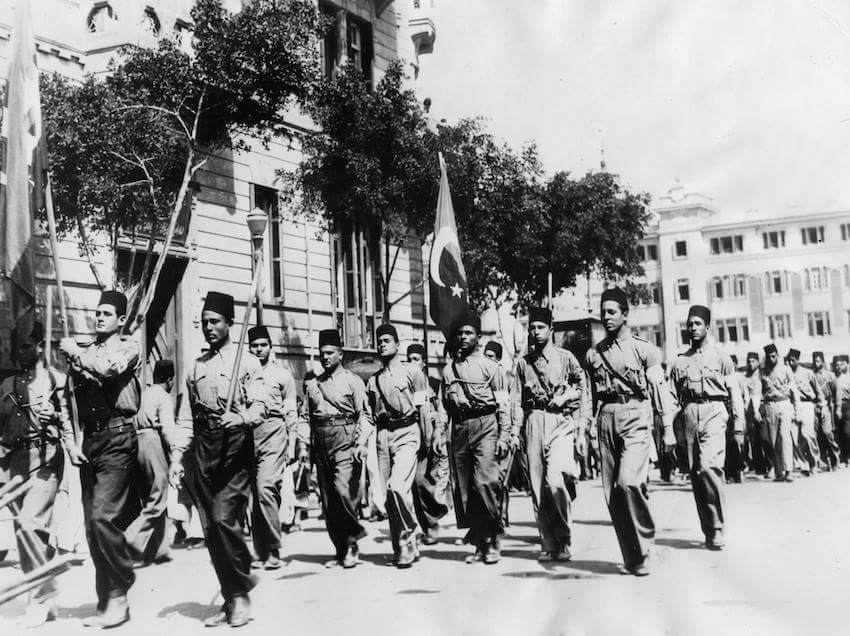
Blue Shirts parade at Abdeen Palace in 1936.

After student demonstrations against the Anglo-Egyptian Treaty of 1936 and the anti-labor policies of the government began to reveal cracks in the previously ironclad Wafd coalition, party leaders created a youth wing dubbed the "Blue Shirts." However, rather than capitalizing on the grassroots nature of the youth movements, the party instead tried to slot the Blue Shirts onto their own rung in the top-down Wafd hierarchy, presenting members with uniforms, badges, and a standardized salute – all under the motto "Obedience & Struggle." By June 1937, the Wafd feared that the Blue Shirts were becoming too militant, and thereafter further restricted their privileges. Having never fully embraced youth mobilization, by the close of the 1930s the uneasy Wafd leadership had essentially abandoned any efforts at intergenerational coalition-building.

=== Accommodation of the British presence ===
Easily the greatest factor contributing to popular disillusionment with the Wafd was the party's failure to boycott the Farouk government after it acceded to the Anglo-Egyptian Treaty of 1936. The policies followed by the party during the Anglo-Egyptian crisis of the mid-1930s alienated many Egyptian nationalists – heretofore the single most reliable support bloc for the Wafd – and severed the party between its small but powerful accommodationist minority and its large but voiceless resistant majority. The failure of the Wafd to more aggressively oppose the continuation of the British presence "left Egyptian politics devoid of a popularly legitimized leader or party."

=== Dissolution ===
The collapse of the widespread popular support once commanded by the Wafd has been historically attributed to the combined embattlements of three distinct trends in Egyptian politics of the pre-revolutionary era. The party, along with all other Egyptian political parties, was banned in January 1953 by Gamal Abdel Nasser following the Free Officers Revolution of 1952. The paper of the party, Al Misri, was also closed in 1954.

== Electoral history ==
=== House of Representatives elections ===
Election	Party leader	Seats	+/–	Position
1923–1924	Saad Zaghloul	179 / 211	▲179	▲1st
1925	Saad Zaghloul	113 / 211	▼66	1st
1926	Saad Zaghloul	171 / 211	▲58	1st
1929	Mostafa el-Nahhas	216 / 232	▲45	1st
1931	Mostafa el-Nahhas	0 / 150	▼216	▼ Boycotted
1936	Mostafa el-Nahhas	190 / 232	▲190	▲1st
1938	Mostafa el-Nahhas	14 / 264	▼176	▼3rd
1942	Mostafa el-Nahhas	232 / 264	▲218	▲1st
1945	Mostafa el-Nahhas	0 / 264	▼218	▼ Boycotted
1950	Mostafa el-Nahhas	226 / 319	▲226	▲1st

== See also ==
- Al-Wafd
- Hoda Shaarawi
- Liberalism in Egypt
- Makram Ebeid
- Wissa Wassef
- Zafiya Zahlul

== Bibliography ==
- Al-Sayyid-Marsot, Afaf Lutfi (1977). Egypt's Liberal Experiment: 1922–1936. University of California Press. ISBN 9780520031098.
- el-Din Aly, Mohammed Alaa (1985). Mustafa Al-Nahhas: a Case Study of Egyptian Political Leadership (PDF) (Thesis). University of London.
- Deeb, Marius (1979). Party Politics in Egypt: the Wafd & its rivals 1919–1939. Ithaca Press. ISBN 9780903729406.
- Gordon, Joel (1989). "The False Hopes of 1950: The Wafd's Last Hurrah and the Demise of Egypt's Old Order". International Journal of Middle East Studies. 21 (2): 193–214. doi:10.1017/S0020743800032281. ISSN 0020-7438. JSTOR 163074.
- Jankowski, James P. (1970). "The Egyptian Blue Shirts and the Egyptian Wafd, 1935–1938". Middle Eastern Studies. 6 (1): 77–95. JSTOR 4282308.
- Moore, David F. (1965). The Wafd Party of Egypt: 1936–1945 (Thesis). American University of Beirut. ProQuest 2316005707.
- Terry, Janice J. (1982). The Wafd: Cornerstone of Egyptian Political Power. Publisher: Third World Centre for Research and Publishing. ISBN 9780861990009.
- Quraishi, Zaheer M. (1967). Liberal Nationalism in Egypt; Rise and Fall of the Wafd Party. Jamal Printing Press. ISBN 9780861990009.
