= Socialism in Egypt =

Political ideology in Egypt

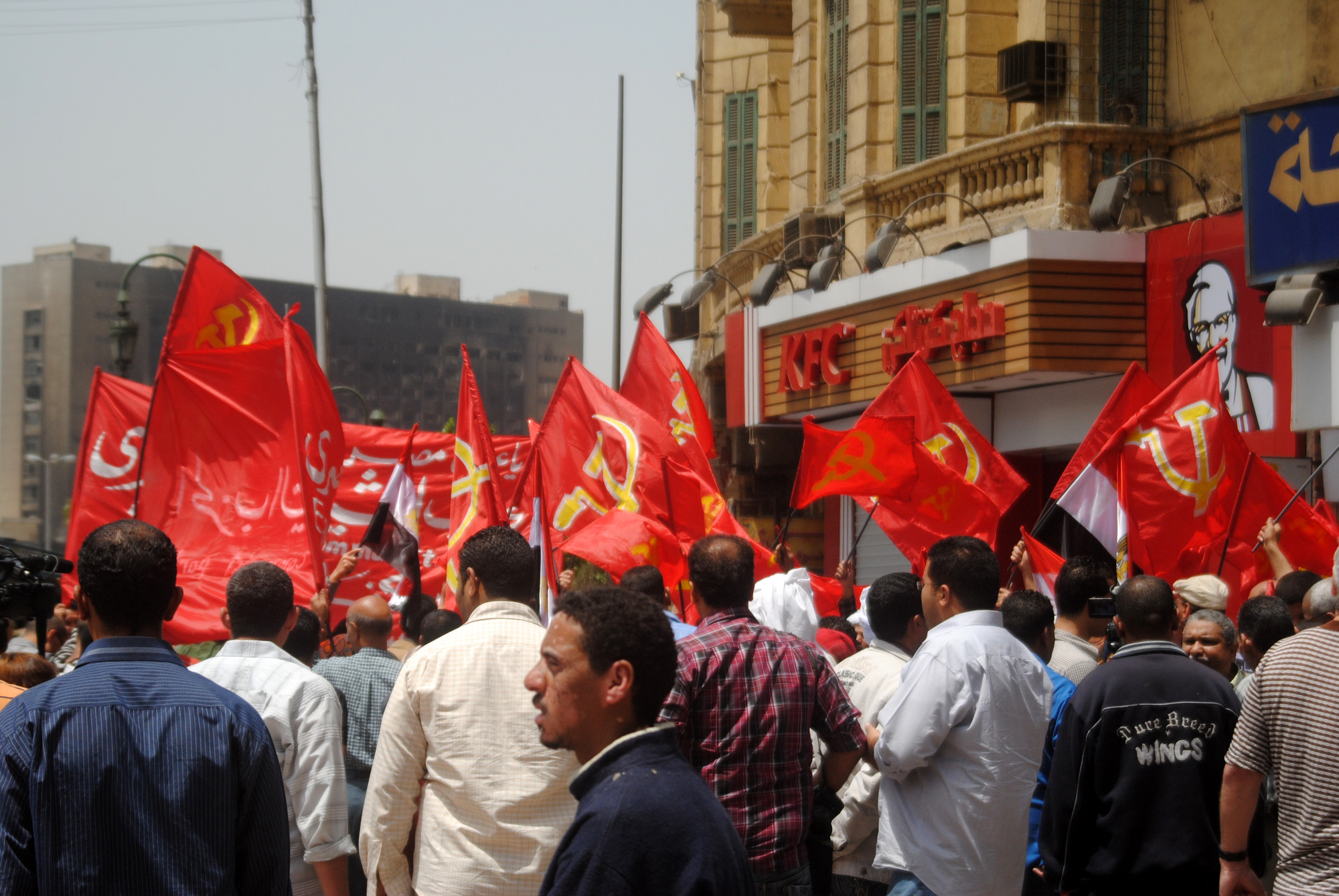
Egyptian Communist Party flags in Tahrir Square

Socialism in Egypt as a political movement dates back to the early 20th century, with the founding of the first Egyptian Socialist Party taking place in 1921. Despite facing severe state repression throughout the years, Egyptian organized labour has consistently fought for workers' rights. Egyptian president Gamal Abdel Nasser developed a special type of Third-World Socialism, dubbed Nasserism, which has inspired many Arab and African socialist movements, such as the FLN in Algeria and the Third International Theory in Libya. While Egypt transitioned towards capitalism under President Anwar Sadat, Egyptian socialists have remained harsh critics of privatization and neoliberalism in Egypt. Workers' uprisings in the early 2000s Egypt under President Hosni Mubarak eventually developed into the 2011 Egyptian Revolution.

== History ==
=== Kingdom of Egypt ===
==== 'Capitalism without Capitalists' ====
During the reign of Muhammad Ali Pasha in the early 1800s, the Egyptian economy began to enter the modern capitalist era. Muhammad Ali focused on growing grain and cotton for European markets in exchange for capital for industrialization. Cotton was grown at such a scale that by 1836 it accounted for 80% of Egyptian exports. The government maintained a monopoly on cotton production using workers who were conscripted in a semi-feudal system, with historian Mourad Wahba describing this stage of the Egyptian economy as "capitalism without capitalists". The government grew cotton production through intermittent, unpaid forced labor to manufacture a class of day laborers or tenants who could not easily afford rent. The Egyptian state seized large swaths of what was then privately owned land; by 1907, over 90% of Egyptian rural families either did not own enough land for subsistence or had no land at all. To live, they either worked for large estates, rented land, or became wage workers. Peasant revolts broke out against this new system; one in 1864 was described by Lucie, Lady Duff-Gordon as a 'communist' uprising. Muhammad Ali's successors borrowed large amounts for foreign debt to pay for their lifestyles.

Due to a struggling economy and failed expensive projects, the Khedive of Egypt formed the Caisse de la Dette Publique, a national debt council, to oversee repayment. This council, which was run by wealthy foreign investors, gradually eroded the national sovereignty of the Egyptian state, especially after Egypt declared bankruptcy in 1876. Further financial concessions sparked the 1882 uprising against the government and its ruling landlord class. After a British intervention defeated the uprising, Britain established the 'veiled protectorate'. Egypt became a de facto British colony run by the Consuls-General, beginning with Lord Cromer. Cromer resolved the deficit but damaged native industry, as historian Afaf Marsot explains:

By the turn of the century Cromer had rendered Egypt solvent, albeit at the expense of Egyptian industry, and had transformed agriculture into a monoculture, cotton, to feed the mills of Lancashire. The cultivation of tobacco was prohibited and an excise tax imposed on imported tobacco helped to balance the budget. Attempts to set up local industries were discouraged by Cromer, who loaded them with tariffs equal to the taxes paid on imported goods, rendering them non-competitive. Textiles, which should have thrived using Egyptian cotton, were deliberately discouraged so that cotton could be exported. Egypt was relegated to becoming a provider of raw materials for Britain.

Economically, the Egyptian state was still heavily reliant on agriculture, namely cotton, which grew to 93% of exports by 1914. While a small industrial sector existed, the British administration's significant austerity measures reduced the Egyptian state's ability to develop an indigenous economy, instead preserving power in the hands of a small, British-friendly, large land-owning class. Native Egyptian workers were paid little, and often subject to fraud or abuse. The first unions and strike actions hit Egypt by the turn of the 20th Century, when coal dockworkers in 1900 and cigarette rollers in 1899 organized the first unions in Egyptian history. At the start of World War I, the legal fiction of the Khedivate itself was abolished in place of the Sultanate of Egypt, a more explicit British dictatorship under martial law, after the British feared that Khedive Abbas II was planning to join the Central Powers. During the conflict, the Egyptian Labour Corps (ELC) was drafted by the British during their campaign against the Ottoman Empire. The workers were responsible for back-breaking work such as draining swamps and building railroads for the British army. Laborers in the corps were subjected to a distinct collective racial oppression, such as flogging by British overseers. As William Knott, a British conscientious objector, wrote:

The treatment of these Egyptians is a scandal. They [the British] talk about modern civilization and abolishing slavery, yet these men have taskmasters paid by the British government to whip them like dogs with long leather whips. Even the British and Australians kick and bully them unmercifully.

By recruiting Egyptians from all over the country and subjecting them to abysmal conditions, the British had inadvertently linked the national movement with the labor movement. Up to 200 police officers were killed in Upper Egypt in incidents directly related to Labour Corps recruitment. ELC workers who fought against brutal conditions launched major mutinies against the British, exploding in 1917. As one British soldier noted:

At daybreak this morning we were all called back to quell a disturbance among the Egyptians. They were refusing to work on account of one of their members sentenced to a flogging. . . . They were very threatening and commenced to come at us with sticks and stones. . . . First a volley of two rounds were fired overhead, then two rounds at their feet, then the Officers gave the order to let them have it. Five were killed and 9 or 10 wounded. This settled them. . . . It was an awful sight, and the effect of the sight of blood on the Egyptians was instantaneous. Even our officers turned their heads.

==== Early Socialists and the Labour Movement ====
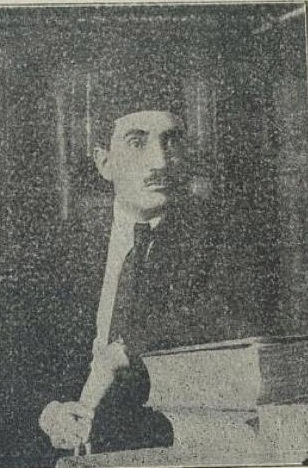
Salama Musa, 1924

While no socialist party existed until the 1919 Egyptian revolution, Marxist ideas began to spread among Egyptian students in Europe at the turn of the 20th century. By 1908, there were around 600 Egyptian students in Europe, mostly in France but also in the UK and Germany, who founded student organizations with close ties to the local socialist movements in their respective countries. Salama Mousa studied in England and joined the Fabian Society, while students in France had a close relationship with French socialists. Mousa's first writings on socialism in 1913 are considered the first Arabic works regarding the topic. In 1915, Mustafa al-Mansuri wrote Tarikh al-Mathahib al-Ishtirakiyah (The History of Socialist Ideologies), declaring on the industrial revolution:

"There is no sane person who wants to return to the dark ages ... Thus, we have to have the machines serve man rather than compete with him. But how can we do this when the morals of the machines cannot be changed and the capitalists have the expense of the pain and toiling of the laborers? ... The only way to bring happiness to mankind is to abolish private ownership and the place capital in the hands of the workers themselves."

Later in 1919, al-Mansuri published two books, one a translation of Tolstoy and the other a commentary on economist Henry George with regard to how Georgism can be applied to Egypt. Another early Arab socialist around this time was the Syrian Niqula al-Haddad. Haddad had met the American socialist Eugene Debs and started an Arab socialist society in New York in 1910, later moving to Egypt. Haddad argued against reformists, instead making the case for a socialist system where "every individual should enjoy all the result of his labor on the basis that people who share labor should also share its fruits, each according to his work".

==== 1919 Revolution ====
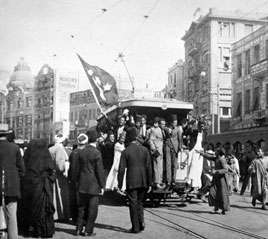
Demonstrations of tram workers in Cairo during the 1919 Revolution

After the war, a group of nationalist politicians led by Saad Zaghloul formed an Egyptian delegation (Arabic: Wafd) to demand Egyptian independence at the Paris Peace Conference. However, the British colonial administrators refused, sparking the 1919 Egyptian revolution. The resulting mass protests of Egyptians and the struggle between the liberal Wafd party, the conservative monarchy and the British eventually culminated in the Declaration of Egyptian Independence in 1922, the Egyptian Constitution of 1923, and the election of Zaghloul as prime minister in 1924. Egyptian workers were pivotal during the revolution; labor uprisings and strikes paralyzed the economy in what was the first mass movement in Egyptian history, as Egyptians began to develop both a national and class consciousness. Peasants (called fallaheen in Arabic) cut railway and communication lines to weaken British retributive violence. After Zaghloul and the Wafd were arrested on March 8, tram workers and taxi drivers went on strike, a few days later, all forms of transportation ceased to exist. By the 29th, management agreed to create a council to investigate claims of abuse by tram workers, but the workers demanded that representatives participate in the council on an equal basis. In the end, the government agreed to the workers' demands, including higher wages. Wage workers refused to work unless Zaghloul and the Wafd were freed and demanded complete independence. The British compared the situation in Egypt with the Russian Revolution around the same time:

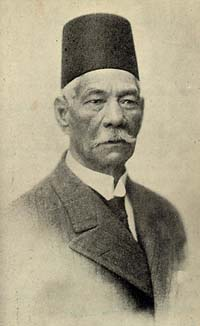
Saad Zaghlul - first leader of the Wafd

Landowners and omdehs generally were reported seriously alarmed at the attitude of the fellaheen, the damage done to property, cattle lifting, danger to the water supply and the likelihood of further unrest. They were becoming exasperated with Cairo and the "effendi" agitators to whose activities their losses were attributable; while they were uneasy at the appearance amongst the fellaheen of what, from their point of view, they regarded as the worst symptom of Bolshevism, namely the proposal to partition large estates for the benefit of the small holders and landle.

The connections between the Wafd in 1919 and the Bolshevik movement are unclear. According to the Egyptian politician Hafez Afifi Pasha, the Russian delegation at Paris promised to drive the English out of Egypt by financially supporting the Wafd and supporting the movement in their propaganda. However, the historian Mohammed Nuri El-Amin argues that a Wafd-Bolshevik alliance was exaggerated by British intelligence. While in Paris, Zaghloul instructed his group to only focus on Egyptian independence to "the exclusion of all other targets that are usually apt to discredit political movements". In June 1919, Zaghloul sent a letter to leaders of the Wafd movement back in Egypt, declaring:

"The Wafd does not approve the leaflets which indicate that the Egyptians depend on the Germans and applaud the victory of the Bolsheviks. These leaflets benefit our enemies in their claim that the Egyptian movement has connections with the Germans and the Bolshevik movement".

Zaghloul was not interested in socialism and, as did the Wafd party as a whole post-Zaghloul, rejected a revolutionary approach, instead pushed for gradualist negotiations - only using mass protests for leverage in negotiations and not as a means in and of themselves to achieve independence. The Indian socialist M. N. Roy criticized Zaghloul for abandoning revolutionary struggle, writing:

The latest political events in Egypt signify the collapse of opportunist centrism. They prove how history has deprived the colonial bourgeoisie of a consistent revolutionary role. ... In a rather peculiar way, Egypt is enjoying all the sensations of a bourgeois revolution. Feudalism and reactionary bureaucracy are defeated; imperial exploitation will be carried on in the future through the medium of the native bourgeoisie. The basis of imperial rule is widened, but the revolutionary consciousness of the anti-imperialist hosts will also be quickened. Thus grows the struggle, and the day is drawing nearer when the people of Egypt will be free, in spite of the fact that British Imperialism, embodied in King Fuad, has secured the loyally of Zaghlul Pasha. It will simply help the revolutionary forces to lose another illusion.

===== First Egyptian Communist Party =====
It was during the 1919 revolution that Joseph Rosenthal believed that the time was right to establish an Egyptian Communist Party (ECP). Rosenthal was interested in Marxism even before immigrating to Egypt in 1897 and had helped establish some of the first unions in Egyptian history, namely the cigarette workers' union. In 1921, he formed the Confederation Generale du Travail (CGT), reaching a membership of 20,000 by 1923. The Egyptian Socialist Party (ESP) was formed in the same year, uniting many labor unions to coordinate factory strikes. From late 1921 to early 1922, eighty-one strikes broke out in fifty factories. In late December 1921, Rosenthal met with Makram Ebied, a member of the Wafd, and they agreed to continue the strikes and "keep the fire of enthusiasm burning in the students, for Zaghlul must conduct the negotiations with Great Britain". At its peak, the organization had roughly a thousand members, mostly in Alexandria and Cairo.

"Do not despair. Keep a brave heart. The advanced workers of all countries are coming to your aid. Expose the shameful conduct of the Egyptian government. UNITE AROUND YOUR COMMUNIST PARTY. Demand the release of the imprisoned communists. Demand a determined and irreconcilable struggle against British imperialism for the complete and real independence of Egypt."

— Harry Pollitt, Sen Katayama, M.N. Roy, "Against British Capitalism in Egypt", Daily Worker.

The Wafd party, however, was not led by workers or socialists, but by the educated upper classes, mostly nationalist students and lawyers, whose main interests were protecting the middle class and landed elites. It attempted to control and direct the workers to further its agenda - the complete removal of British influence from Egypt. The Wafd would later create its own unions, but these Wafd-controlled unions were instead used to suppress the workers' movement. Zaghloul was determined to use the labor movement for Wafdist interests; his government dissolved the communist-oriented CGT and replaced it with the Wafd-led National Labour Union.

A British report in June 1922 illustrates the enormous support the Wafd had among the workers, to the dismay of the socialists:

An Egyptian workman dressed in a gallabieh asked to be allowed to speak. He was given permission by El Orabi, who did not know him personally and who told the audience that he (the workman) would be responsible for his own words. The workman then spoke in poetical form of his misery at the commencement of the war and of his career in the Egyptian Labour Corps, where he had been obliged to work to keep his family, although he hated the English. He ended his poem by two verses about Zaghlul Pasha, at the mention of whose name the audience broke into cheers for Zaghlul. Husni-el-Orabi did not hide his annoyance caused by the fact that members of the Egyptian Socialist Party should so compromise their principles of Socialism by cheering a Nationalist leader.

Joseph Stalin: "For the same reasons, the struggle that the Egyptians merchants and bourgeois intellectuals are waging for the independence of Egypt is objectively a revolutionary struggle, despite the bourgeois origin and bourgeois title of the leaders of Egyptian national movement, despite the fact that they are opposed to socialism; whereas the struggle that the British "Labour" Government is waging to preserve Egypt's dependent position is for the same reason a reactionary struggle, despite the proletarian origin and the proletarian title of the members of the government, despite the fact that they are "for" socialism".

The early ESP was plagued by internal disputes and divisions, namely between moderates in the Cairo wing who sought to insert the movement as a left faction of the Wafd and more hardline members in the Alexandria section who believed the party should exist independently of the Wafd. Salama Mousa, an early member of the party, criticized Rosenthal as a "radical", declared that "our loyalty to Egypt must be stronger than our loyalty to socialism. Independence is our primary goal and socialism is secondary." Ultimately, Mousa would leave the movement; the ESP changed its name to the Egyptian Communist Party when it joined the Comintern in 1922. Rosenthal himself would be ousted from the party during an internal power struggle with Husni al-Urabi. The government planned to deport Rosenthal since November 1922. However, since he was born in Ottoman Palestine, he was not a citizen of any European country. His legal status remained in limbo until he agreed to a deal with Zaghlul, where he would be allowed to remain in Egypt only if he refrained from socialist activities. In 1924, the party launched strikes in Alexandria demanding the recognition of their trade unions, the introduction of an eight-hour workday, and legislation for the protection of employees. Workers seized the factories, leading to mass arrests and police surveillance of the party. In the end, socialist movements were forced underground during the inter-war years due to both external suppression and internal division. The Wafd under Zaghloul crushed the early independent ECP in a wave of arrests by March.

==== The Wafd and the problem of the colonial bourgeoisie ====
Traditional Marxist theory argued that liberal revolutions preceded socialist revolutions. As Egypt was a mostly feudal country with limited capitalism, an immediate socialist revolution was not possible.

According to Joseph Stalin, there were three types of "eastern" countries:

1. Countries that had little or no proletariat and were quite undeveloped industrially.
2. Countries that were underdeveloped industrially and had a relatively small proletariat.
3. Countries that were capitalistically more or less developed and had a fairly large national proletariat.

Egypt, according to Stalin, was a type two nation "where the national bourgeoisie has already split up into a revolutionary party and a compromising party, but where the compromising section of the bourgeoisie is not yet able to join up with imperialism". Stalin argued that the Communists should therefore abandon forming a united national front against imperialism, instead forming "a revolutionary bloc of the workers and the petty bourgeoisie". This bloc would criticize the national bourgeoisie for choosing to compromise with the imperialists, since the Wafd believed in negotiations with the British as opposed to armed struggle, as well as directly fighting imperialism itself. The Comintern in 1926 described the Wafd as "an Egyptian Kuomintang along its own lines, and still in the first stage of its development", ordering the ECP to reorganize as an "Egyptian left-Kuomintang".

Fuad Mursi, founder of the leftist Raya group, explained the goal of Egyptian communists as:

We were not asking workers to make a socialist revolution but . . . the national democratic revolution.. . . We were concentrating on the national question, getting rid of British colonialism and imperialism—not only the monarchy, the remnants of feudalism and Egyptian monopolies ... We were asking the workers to concentrate on the national democratic question in the field of politics and to change their working conditions in the economic field.

Mursi argued that the working class, petite bourgeoisie, peasants, and progressive intellectuals were a progressive revolutionary force, while the large landowners, foreign capitalists and the national bourgeoisie were reactionary to national liberation. The leftist Democratic Movement for National Liberation (DMNL) organization instructed its members to vote Wafd in the 1950 election in races without socialist candidates. However, some socialists rejected an alliance with the Wafd - viewing it as a completely reactionary party. Saad Zahran, an early member of the ECP, commented:

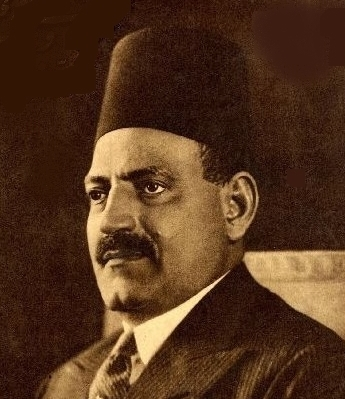
Leader of the Wafd after the death of Zaghloul, Mostafa al-Nahhas: "The realization of the legitimate interests of the workers is in the employers' interest, just as ensuring the legitimate interests of the employers is in the workers' interest. You understand that the Wafd government is the people's government, and that in the vanguard of this faithful people are her sons the workers, whom I know to be the trustworthy soldiers of the Wafd and its strong arm!'

We accepted the Stalinist point that the grand bourgeoisie was not nationalist and therefore could not be allies. Instead, we said that our allies must be the poor and middle-level peasants and workers. We saw the Wafd as the client of imperialism and we opposed the other communist groups that wanted to make an alliance with it. Our interest was to lessen the Wafd's effect especially on the peasants.

After breaking with the Wafd, the ECP denounced the party as an enemy of the workers' movement:

The Wafd is the party of bourgeois, landowning counter-revolutionary national reformism. It unites the rich capitalists, lawyers, speculators and liberal landowners, who, for fear of a people's revolution, favour a deal with the enslavers of Egypt and count on receiving some small remuneration in return. This is the party which deceives the entire population, the party of national treason ... the entire history of the Wafd since 1919 is the history of its struggle against the revolutionary workers, peasants, and toilers in general. When the Wafd was in power, all independent class-conscious workers' organisations and all revolutionary organisations were destroyed. The Wafd is afraid of the revolutionary victory of the workers and peasants, and with its strength and means endeavours to block it ... There can be no successful and victorious revolutionary struggle with them. Between the camp of the Wafd and the camp of the People's anti-imperialist and agrarian peasant revolution lies an impassable gulf. To overthrow the imperialist yoke it is necessary to break and destroy the influence of the Wafd on the masses, its influence on the workers, peasants and petit bourgeoisie.

==== Egyptian economy between revolutions ====
By the end of the first World War, an urban Egyptian working class had emerged, although Egypt's economy was still heavily centered on agriculture owned by a few large landowners. However, real wages remained stagnant, if not falling, since the war when accounting for a 25% increase in the cost of living. Egyptian workers faced brutally long hours, while basic food items such as meat and eggs were considered a luxury, and paid vacations, sick pay and worker compensation were a rare sight.

==== Suppression and re-birth of the Egyptian Left ====
During the late 1920s and 1930s, union politics and workers' organizations, such as the General Federation of Labour Unions, were mostly Wafd-dominated, as the Wafd relied on them for votes in exchange for tepid support of labor rights. The Wafd heavily relied on its unions for its fight against the autocratic 1930 constitution, which increased the powers of the King, successfully getting it repealed after years of strikes and protests. The ECP supported the Wafd in their common goal of reinstating the 1923 constitution.

By 1936, much had changed. King Farouk ascended to the throne at the age of sixteen after the death of his father. The Wafd signed a treaty with the British government, agreeing to reduce the number of British troops in Egypt (except for the Suez Canal and in times of war), yet fell short of complete independence - greatly damaging the Wafd's credibility and beginning the slow decline of the Wafd. In Europe, the rise of fascism frightened many observers in Egypt, who looked for inspiration in the left. One such place of inspiration was a local bookstore owned by Henry Curiel. During World War II, Curiel founded the Egyptian Movement of National Liberation (EMML), a Marxist party. Even while in prison in 1942, Curiel still organized dissent - he led a hunger strike along with members of the Muslim Brothers for better conditions. Another leftist party was Iskra, founded by Hillel Schwartz. The Soviet Union's victory over Nazi Germany at Stalingrad established it as a potential anti-imperialist power for Egyptians.

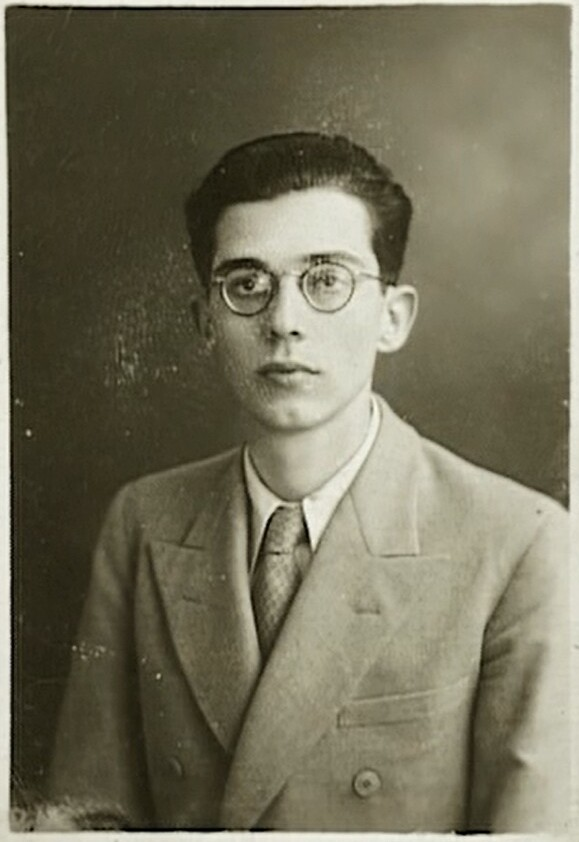
Henri Curiel, founder of the DMNL

The war had accelerated the national movement, as local nationalists demanded for complete independence as a reward for Egypt's participation. When the Allied soldiers left Egypt, wartime workers were fired and unable to find work. This, along with growing land scarcity and higher prices, led to an increase in the intensity of the national movement all across the political spectrum. At the beginning of the 1945/1946 school year, left-wing students called for a strike against renewing the Anglo-Egyptian treaty and the rejection of any defensive pact with Britain. On the ninth of February 1946, thousands of students held a general conference at Cairo University and later marched toward the Abdeen Palace across the Abbas Bridge. There, the army and police brutally attacked the protesters, killing over twenty protesters and injuring 84. The students and local union workers formed the National Committee for Students and Workers (NCSW) ten days later, which called a general strike on the 21st. The EMNL and Iskra worked together with the NCSW in the student councils and strikes. Tens of thousands of workers joined the movement, resulting in the largest protests in Egypt since 1919. In response, British Prime Minister Clement Attlee ordered British troops to evacuate its troops except for the Suez Canal.

The main issue with the NCSW was its lack of organization, as the quickly accelerating events made a concrete leadership impossible.

The National Committee of Workers and Students was a very fluid body,- that is why almost anyone who participated in the national movement in 1946 or 1947 can say that he was, at one time or another, a member. People were coming and going all the time. People used to drop out and others used to come and replace them. It wasn't a very circumscribed body so that sometimes people used to be members without being elected. People would just be there carrying out assignments or tasks within the Committee.

Though Prime Minister Ismail Sidqi successfully quieted the movement through mass arrests of leftists and protesters, strikes and student protests would continue the next year, led in part by Curiel's DMNL.

==== Position on Palestine and Zionism ====
"Jews were potential Zionists, but that anyhow all Zionists were communists, and he looked at the matter as much from the point of view of communism as from the point of view of Zionism"

— British ambassador Ronald Hugh Campbell describing position of Mahmoud Al-Nuqrashi - the Egyptian P.M during the 1948 Arab-Israeli war,

Joseph Rosenthal, himself the son of Eastern-European Jews and was born in Ottoman-era Palestine, was an anti-Zionist; he accepted the Marxist opinion that Zionism was reactionary and only a socialist revolution would solve the "Jewish Question". Later Egyptian socialists also criticized Zionism as imperialist; Ahmad Sadiq Sa'd argued that Zionism was a tool of British imperialism to secure British interests in the region. Egyptian Jewish socialists also criticized Zionism: Yusuf Darwish, who converted to Islam in 1947, was firmly anti-Zionist and supported the 1936 Palestinian revolt; Marcel Israel founded the Jewish Anti-Zionist League; while Henri Curiel disagreed with the league's harsh stance, instead taking a more neutral line of a binational solution. As the historian Joel Beinin explains:

While there can be no legitimate doubt that Curiel and the EMNL ideologically rejected Zionism, Curiel freely admitted that he and his group had violently opposed the Jewish Anti-Zionist League, regarding its political line as a "grave error" that had led to "provocative scenes" with the middle-class Jews of Dahir. He believed Iskra's decision to accept the government's dissolution of the League on the eve of unification with the EMNL was a tacit admission of the bankruptcy of Iskra's entire political approach. Curiel apparently thought that by refraining from attacking Zionist ideology directly (just as the DMNL did not criticize Islamic belief and observances) he could more easily convince Egyptian Jews not to identify with Zionism. His unwavering confidence in his political credo often led him to engage confirmed opponents in dialogue, and many times he did win them over. Yet Curiel's rivals regarded his personalistic political style and excessive tactical flexibility as opportunism, which not only opened him to accusations of being a Zionist but also undermined the status of Egyptian Jews in both the communist movement and the country at large. More "provocative scenes" like the one in Dahir, which was favorably noted in the nationalist Egyptian press, might have persuaded more Egyptian nationalists that Egyptian Jews were generally not Zionists.

However, the situation changed when the Soviet Union endorsed partition by voting for UN Resolution 181. The USSR believed that two nations, a Jewish and an Arab nation, were already in existence in Palestine and that they could not live in peace, so partition was needed. The DMNL, the largest socialist movement at the time, later shifted its view into endorsing the Soviet position. The DMNL still believed in the eventual unification of the two states through reconciliation, despite the efforts of the "Arab reactionary elements". The party newspaper described it as:

We do not want to take Palestine away from the Arabs and give it to the Jews, but we want to take it away from imperialism and give it to the Arabs and Jews----Then will begin the long struggle for rapprochement between Arab and Jewish states.

During Egypt's war against Israel, martial law was used to suppress the communist and worker's movement under the government of El Nokrashy. Curiel was later deported to Italy in 1950.

==== On the eve of the monarchy ====
"I own 8000 feddans. Do you think I want Egypt to go communist?"

— Wafd politician Fouad Serageddin Pasha in a conversation with the US Ambassador,

In 1950, the Wafd were elected to power for the last time, with a socialist party earning a single seat in parliament. al-Nahhas began a campaign of full Egyptian independence with the complete withdrawal of British forces from the canal zone. In 1951, he abrogated the 1936 treaty, declaring the presence of British troops in Egypt from then on unlawful. Guerrilla warfare was unleashed on the canal, as small cadres of Egyptians - a coalition of Wafdists, leftists and Muslim Brothers - joined the battle against British imperialism. 80,000 Egyptian workers left their jobs in the British administration, as laborers refused to work in British factories. Railway workers, customs officials, airline employees, and longshoremen refused to handle British supplies. In 1950, a poll showed that 60% of Cairo students wanted either 'Islamic socialism', socialism or communism. There were high hopes for reform, as the new generation of Wafdists, dubbed the "Wafdist Vanguard", emerged as a left-wing faction within the party. Even Serageddin Pasha, a Wafdist politician representing the right wing of the party, described all the Wafdist deputies as "socialists". However, political squabbling both within the party and the cabinet failed to produce adequate reforms, specifically regarding the land situation.

By the last few years on the monarchy, many socialist factions were in existence, dividing the Egyptian left. (Note: These include the main ones: DMNL (Arabic acronym would be HADITU - al-Harakah al-Demoqratiyah lil Tahrur al-Watani), Iskra, and the second Egyptian Communist Party as well as smaller factions such as The Workers Vanguard, Red Star, the Union of Peace Partisans and The New Dawn, as well as countless others.) The main division was between the DMNL, the larger party that stressed a united front for national independence, the newly reorganized Egyptian Communist Party, led by Fuad Mursi and Ismail Sabri Abdullah. The ECP was more rigid in its form, rejected the loose structure of the DMNL and accepting a more leftist position. The Wafd continued its anticommunist position, Curiel was deported to Italy in 1950.

=== Republic of Egypt ===
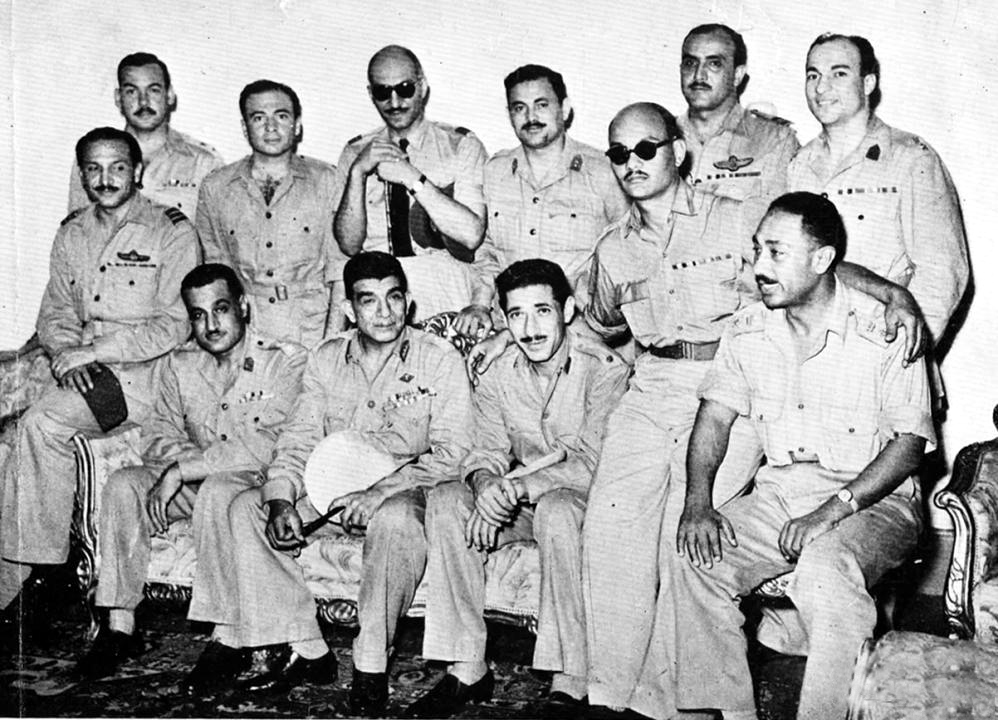
Members of the Free Officers. Front row from left: Abdel Latif Boghdadi, Gamal Abdel Nasser, Mohamed Naguib, Abdel Hakim Amer, Salah Salem. Mohamed Anwar Sadat. Back row from left: Hussein el-Shafei, Khaled Mohieddin, Gamal Salem, Kamal el-Din Hussein, Hassan Ibrahim, Zakaria Mohieddin

Discontent within the army had grown stronger since World War II, so that after the war with Israel, a political movement within the Egyptian military dubbed "The Free Officers" was formed with the goal of overthrowing the regime.

The goals of the officers were laid out in its six principles:

- the elimination of imperialism and its collaborators
- the ending of feudalism
- the ending of the monopoly system
- the establishment of social justice
- the building of a powerful national army
- the establishment of a sound democratic system

The DMNL was given advance knowledge of the coup through Ahmad Hamrush, the leader of the DMNL's military branch. Hamrush then passed the information on to other members of the DMNL, Khalid Muhyi al-Din (Note: Khalid Muhyi al-Din was never a formal member of the DMNL, though he was on the left of the Free Officers movement and had connections with the DMNL's military wing.) and Ahmad Fuad. Khalid himself personally introduced Nasser to Ahmad Fuad, the liaison between the DMNL's central committee and military, in either late 1949 or early 1950. The DMNL agreed to disseminate the officers' political pamphlets via their networks. The DMNL agreed to support the movement, despite it not being an explicitly Marxist group, because they saw the group as the best weapon against the liberal-capitalist feudal monarchy. After the coup of July 23, 1952, the DMNL believed that they could inject Marxist ideas to move the revolution. However, the officer movement initially was not anti-capitalist; one of the first enacted reforms reduced the minimum requirement for companies to have native Egyptian shareholders from 51% to 49%, allowing foreign investors to hold a majority stake.

After King Farouk was overthrown, a new government was proclaimed, the Revolutionary Command Council, with Mohammed Naguib as president - an older more conservative officer. The first major crisis the regime faced was a major protest at Kafr al-Dawwar, just twenty days after the coup. Kafr al-Dawwar was a small industrial city with two large textile factories and a workers' housing complex. The average daily wage was seventeen piasters a day, low even for Egyptian standards. The workers were motivated by the RCC's revolutionary slogans, demanding their rights "in the name of Muhammad Naguib and the revolution". The workers at the plant rose on August 12, demanding improved conditions.

The company called the police, who barricaded the workers inside the factory. Some workers threw rocks at the police. In the ensuing battle, two offices were set on fire and one worker was killed, with many wounded. The head of police contacted the army to put down the rebellion, who sent five hundred soldiers. The next day, trade unionist Mustafa Khamis led two demonstrations. The second demonstration led to a number of deaths. As Muhammad Metwalli al-Sha'rawi recalled:

When the first demonstration of Mustafa Khamis was marching past the factory, one Aziz al-Jamal, nephew of Husayn al-Jamal, General Director of the Misr Company, fired some shots. At that point, the soldiers thought that the demonstration was armed. . . . The forces sent shots into the air, not hitting anyone and dispersing the crowd. Meanwhile, Mustafa Khamis tried to pass over the bridge in order to lead his group behind the second line of demonstrators. Mistakenly, he was later blamed for the killing of the soldiers despite the fact that his demonstration. . . had no connection with the place in which the soldiers were killed. He came from the housing area whereas the other demonstration passed by al-Mahmudiyya Canal.

On the 14th, a hastily summoned court was created to try Mustafa Khamis and Ahmad al-Bakri, the strike leaders. In just four days, they were sentenced to death by hanging, performed on the factory grounds. Khalid Muhyi al-Din explained the situation:

The military court gave Khamis and Bakri the death penalty but there was resistance in the Council to this. I remember Gamal Abdul Nasser. . . and I think Yusuf Siddiq, although I am not sure about him . . . were against the decision. The majority were in favor. We tried to postpone it, we tried to have a judgment other than the death penalty . . . but the Council wanted to make the workers and the people afraid of any activity that sabotaged the government ... They said "if we let workers strike and burn factories we will not be able to control them. So we must treat them like soldiers and make them afraid" Also, they were afraid of the workers, and at this time there was the Soviet Union and communism. In the back of their minds they were afraid of this---- It was a tragedy.

While other communist movements denounced the hangings, the DMNL was still attempting to maintain a relationship between them and the RCC, maintaining hopes that they could influence the officers to the left. The DMNL applauded a new law limiting land ownership to 200 feddans, 300 for large families, passed on September 9, 1952, pointing to this as evidence of successful leftist influence. Ismail Sabri Abd Allah of the ECP gave a different view:

We were confused first because of two contradicting things. We thought that objectively the overthrow of the King was something very positive but due to our political education we believed that nothing good and durable could come from the army. The army was a tool of oppression, conservative by definition, and to us there was nothing that could be called a progressive coup d'etat. We were against coups. We were for revolution. In the first days our position was ambiguous, saluting the overthrow of the King but asking the military to fraternize with the population and form neighborhood committees and village committees of workers and soldiers...Then there was a strike at Kafr al-Dawwar. The army intervened and two leaders of the strike were hanged. Then we said that this is a fascist regime.

In total, around 550 communists were arrested from 1952 to 1955. In January 1953, the new regime arrested DMNL members - including both Hamrush and Siddiq. As a response, the DMNL demanded to "put an end to the fascist regime of Najib". Since political parties were banned by this point, the non-officer political currents united to form the "National Democratic Front" - an alliance of the remaining socialists and Wafdist liberals in the country. Around the same time, the leftist splinter groups united to form the United Communist Party. However, these opposition movements were too little too late; Nasser and his officer corps were able to secure their power by 1954. Khalid Muhyi al-Din explained the reason that:

the movement of 1954 failed because people were not ready to come back to the old political system. They were not in favor of real democratic life. They wanted a strong leader to reform the country. The democratic trend was found only among lawyers, students and some parts of the working class. But the majority of people were in favor of keeping the situation as it was because there was a probability of reform. So the coup succeeded ... The population was fed up with the old system and it thought that the mistakes of the past came directly from the multi-party system.

==== Nasser ====
After securing a political victory over both Naguib in the RCC and over the remaining political opposition in the country, Nasser was free to implement his economic reforms. Though Nasser would pivot Egypt towards the Soviet Union and the Eastern Bloc, he would continue to suppress local Egyptian communists as well as adopting a position of nonalignment. When Nasser first visited the Soviet Union in 1955, he announced that his position of anticommunism would not be dimmed by the trip.

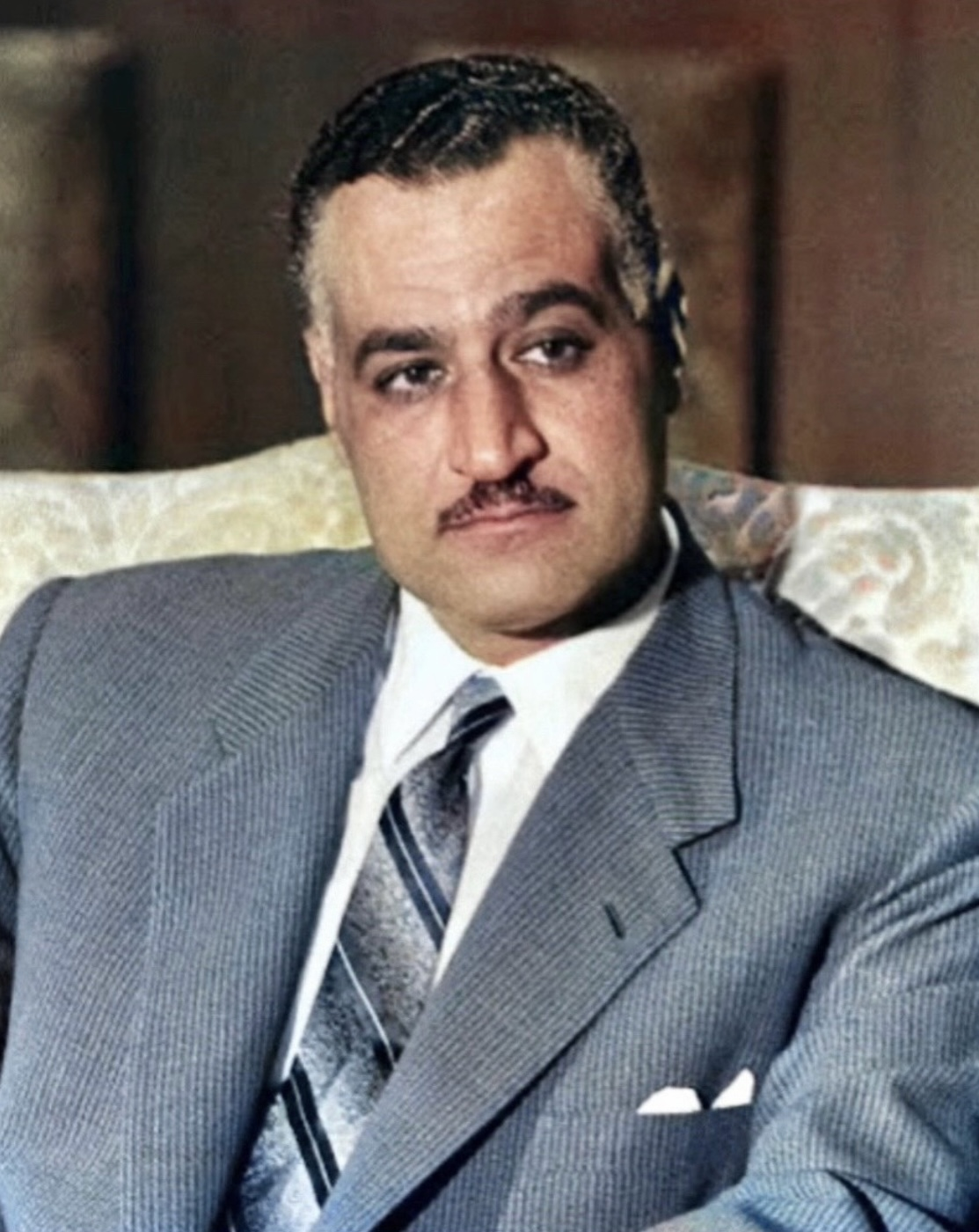
Gamal Abdel Nasser: "The workers don't demand; we give"

===== Reforms =====
====== Agricultural reforms ======
Talks of agrarian reform had been in discussion since the 1940s as politicians attempted to remedy the deep inequality in land holdings in the country. In 1944, the first project for limiting land ownership was proposed to the Egyptian senate at 50 feddans, later raised to 100 feddans before being defeated in 1947. By this time later into the kingdom's history, many in the Egyptian political sphere: from the NCSW and labor unions on the left, to Mustafa al-Nahhas and the Wafdist Vanguard on the center, to Ismail Sidqi and Sayyid Qutb on the right, and even the US State Department recognized the necessity of land reform; the issues remained on where to put the exact legal limit as well as whether reform was either a step towards communism or the cure against it.

On September 9, 1952, a land reform law was passed, declaring a ceiling of 200 feddans per person as well as a 100 feddan increase for families for more than one child, as well as distribution and the establishment of agricultural co-operatives. This law made the state the largest land proprietor, as the acreage not yet distributed netted the government a profit north of £E2.7 million in 1955, beginning the construction of a land bureaucracy. Beneficiaries of the land reforms were required to join government-run agricultural cooperatives, where the government would buy a quota of farm output at below market prices to then sell on the world market at above market prices.

===== 'Socialism without socialists' =====
In the early Nasserist period (1952–1961) local unions were purged of any political independence; by the end of 1953 almost every leftist/communist labor leader was in jail. Like the Wafd before them, the RCC sought to control to the labor movement in a game of carrot-and-stick. For example, one of the early labor laws passed increased severance pay and the annual vacation for workers, among other increased benefits. The same law, however, also increased the probationary period where workers were not entitled to the same wages and benefits from three months to a six-month period that could be renewed once. In practice, workers were fired immediately after this period. In 1956, a new constitution was passed into law, guaranteeing work and increases in benefits in case of sickness, old age and disability within the frame of a "democratic, socialist cooperative society". On January 30, 1957, the Egyptian Workers' Federation (ETUF) was founded with around 240,000 workers; an agreement was stuck where the government would tolerate their existence in exchange for choosing their leaders. Unions were in effect subordinate to the government and did not agitate on behalf of workers.

In 1961, Nasser passed the 'socialist decrees'. Many companies were nationalized, and new labor laws were passed. A social insurance plan with increased employer funding was introduced, the minimum wage was doubled and a forty-two hour work week was introduced. The National Union party was replaced by the Arab Socialist Union. While Nasser's government improved the conditions for many workers, it always had a right-wing faction, especially dominate in the early years. The union movement was allowed to form a centralized structure only after promising loyalty to the regime. Nasser's model for Egypt closely emulated the Yugoslavian model of socialism, rather than Stalinist development. As the historian John Waterbury explained:

In the late 1950s Egypt initiated an experiment in state capitalism in which publicly owned holding companies were to compete among themselves for local and foreign markets. The allocation of scarce resources would go to the most efficient. While not excluded, foreign capital was not expected to play much of a role in the economy. By contrast a subordinate domestic private sector was to undertake a major investment load. All this changed after 1961. Local private capital was no longer regarded as of significance and foreign private capital was viewed with suspicion. Competition among public sector companies was superseded by comprehensive planning and the allocation of scarce resources according to this plan. Profits and losses meant little in measuring the success of companies and management, and bargaining for resources became a more highly rewarded managerial skill than efficiency in meeting production norms. Moreover there was no incentive anywhere in the system that would have encouraged an honest appraisal of performance—in the name of protecting socialism's good name and Egypt's international stature, all failures had to be swept under the rug. In this era, the managers of the public sector could use their control of the means of production to consolidate that control, build empires, and otherwise enhance their power. They could not legally enhance their earnings. That could come about only through corruption: deals with private sector contractors, manipulation of black markets, payoffs from foreign suppliers, and so forth.

In 1957, the Unified Egyptian Communist Party (dominated by the DMNL) united with the Raya Group to form the United Egyptian Communist Party in 1957, which then merged again with the Workers' and Peasant's Communist Party (WPCP) to form the Communist Party of Egypt. This group then split in 1958 due to disagreements over the Iraqi Revolution. Nasser issued another crackdown on communists in 1959 and continued until 1964. In 1965, the communists later agreed to dissolve themselves and join the Arab Socialist Union. The ASU's Vanguard Organization was set up by Nasser to consume the left within the state's political framework.

Nasser's solution to class struggle in Egypt was the Arab Socialist Union (ASU), whose goal was to facilitate the "melting away of class differences " through the "national alliance of working forces" between workers, peasants, intellectuals, national capitalists and soldiers. This is where the Egyptian socialists diverged from Marx; while Marxists believed in class struggle, Egyptian socialism believed in Arab unity, even among separate classes. The 1962 July National Charter reserved at half of all elected seats for workers and peasants. The historian Zeinab Abul-Magd states that "it was socialism without socialists: the very ex-officers, bureaucrats, and socioeconomic groups that managed the state and ran the party did not in fact believe in socialism. They cheered for Nasser but were not particularly the faithful ideologues that he envisioned molding". This phrase was coined by the journalist Aḥmad Bahāʼ al-Dīn: "what we discover first, inside the UAR, is that the Revolution has concentrated its efforts on building the 'material characteristics' of socialist society without concentrating on its human characteristics,' i.e., the socialists! There can be no socialism without socialists!"

==== Sadat ====
After the death of Nasser, vice president Anwar Sadat assumed the presidency. He was quickly engaged in a power struggle with the head of the ASU, Ali Sabri. When Sadat proposed an Arab unification plan between Egypt, Libya and Syria, the Supreme Executive Committee of the ASU rejected this plan; Minister of Defense General Muhammed Fawzi was also opposed. Sabri and his clique schemed against Sadat, yet Sadat struck first. In what is now known as the Corrective Revolution, Sadat purged the Nasserist apparatus, including arresting Sabri and his supporters. Under Sadat, the Islamist right was brought back in the politics in an effort to move away from the leftism of the 1960s and towards a rightward policy shift towards privatization and neoliberalism.

In 1975, the ASU came to be split into three organizations, later separate parties: the leftists of the National Progressive Unionist Rally (also known as Tagammu) led by former Free Officer Khaled Muhyi al-Din, the Sadatist centrists of the Egypt Arab Socialist Party led by Mamdouh Salem, and the rightists of the Liberal Socialists led by Mustafa Kamel Murad. The period of 1976-1977 witnessed a brief renewal of democratic pluralism. The former Wafdists established a New Wafd Party, led by a now aging Fouad Serageddin. In the 1976 Egyptian parliamentary election, Sadat's organization won a decisive majority. Yet when the EASP started to criticize Sadat's Israel policy, he instead formed a new party, the National Democratic Party (NDP), which would rule Egypt until 2011.

===== Student and worker radicalism =====
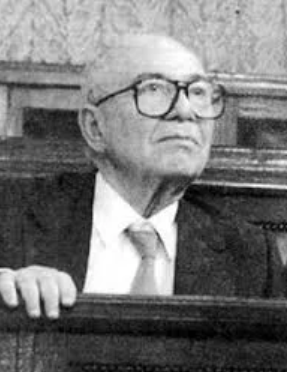
Khalid Mohideen was a left wing "Free Officer", who later led the NDUP in the post-Nasserist political scene

Though student protests under Nasser never quite reached the heights of the 1940s and 50's, after the 1967 war protests restarted when air force officers were given lenient sentences for their mismanagement during the war. These protests were not against the Nasserist system, however, but against the corruption and authoritarianism of the regime. Unlike Nasser, Sadat was never able to fully tame the students. In 1972, leftist students attacked Sadat for not restarting the war against Israel. Sadat was able to quiet this criticism after launching the Ramadan War, as well through building up his security apparatus and supporting Islamist student organizations on campus. Workers continued to strike during the Sadatist period, even before the policy of infitah. In August 1971, ten thousand workers in the Helwan Iron and Steel Company went on strike. Three thousand were arrested after security forces intervened. When ETUF President Salah Gharib tried to negotiate with the workers, he was detained overnight; workers chanted "You are the regime's guy". Later in December, six thousand Alexandria Port workers went on strike over unpaid wages. After arrests were made, workers stormed the police stations to free their colleagues.

Sadat thought that while Tagammu was allowed to exist as a legal party, he could contain the left, specifically his Marxist and Nasserist critics of infitah. Yet these hopes were shattered in 1977, when the students and workers united to launch the 1977 Bread Uprising against cuts to food subsidies. While these protests shook the nation, the organized left was unable to capitalize on the events to move against the regime. Unlike the Islamist right which was courted by Sadat, the left was too constrained by the state to seriously challenge the new political order. Historian and activist Hossam El-Hamalawy describes the state of the Egyptian left after 1977 as following:

The 1977 uprising also signaled the beginning of the end for the Egyptian Left. Splits within virtually every communist organization, which were already suffering from factionalism, took place following the defeat of the uprising. There were tensions in the cadre base-leadership relations. Many militants were demoralized, in addition to the discrediting of the Left in the eyes of many sympathizers in specific and the public in general. The communist organizations did not disappear in the 1980s. They were still active in the universities, syndicates and several industrial workplaces, however their base of support was disintegrating.

In 1978, Sadat revived the Office of the Socialist Prosecutor. Originally created in 1971 during the Corrective Revolution, its new mission was to remove candidates in elections who challenged "the divine laws" of the state. In the spring of that year, Sadat denounced the left as "communists" and "unbelievers", banning the party paper. As Sadat put it after the 1977 uprising, "democracy has fangs and claws." By 1981, most of the leftists who took office in 1979 were in prison.

==== Mubarak ====
"I am one of those who say we must go to the streets to distribute our pamphlets in front of factories and universities. They [the Islamicists] are on the streets, but we are inside."

— Salah Isa,

After the assassination of Sadat, vice president Hosni Mubarak assumed office. Initially, Mubarak freed political prisoners, allowing a wounded left to return to the political arena. Yet the formal parliamentary scene was never able to provide real opposition to the Mubarak regime. Tagammu was really a broad umbrella of different leftist factions: Nasserists, Marxists, Arab Nationalists, social democrats and Islamo-socialists, all united by the political prestige of Khalid Muhyi al-Din. Opposition parties also struggled to cooperate amongst themselves against the regime. In 1985, the neo-Wafd party proposed a national opposition front, yet it was rejected by Tagammu; in 1987 the situation was reversed, now the Wafd rejected a coalition with Tagammu. Tagammu eventually became controlled opposition, able to secure a few seats in parliament but never able to pose a serious threat.

The lack of formal opposition was not indicative of nonexistence on the Arab street, however. By the mid-1980s, demonstrations and protests were occurring on average once every few weeks. In 1985, 50,000 workers participated in strikes and protests. By 1986, this figure doubled. Yet, the lack of workers savings and dependence on the still bloated public sector smothered any revolutionary flame. On February 4, 1986, workers in Mahalla led by a small leftist group - the 'Workers' Defense Committee' - started a major demonstration, specifically demanding one paid holiday (Friday) per week, which they entitled as per a 1981 labor law that went ignored by management. While this strike was crushed by the security forces and members of the WDC were arrested, the government eventually conceded to their demands.

The 1990s saw the government move towards neoliberalism, privatizing many chunks of the public sector. The ETUF was essentially nonexistent; many workers who were members on paper had in reality never received advice from a union official, never participated in a union election, or had even been informed of their rights. In response, unauthorized strikes - meaning strikes called without the consent of the ETUF - became commonplace. Kamal Abu Eita and Kamal Abbas emerged as popular labor leaders against the ETUF and the regime, while Hamdeen Sabbahi formed a new party - the Karama party. One of the largest anti-Mubarak movements during this time was the Kefaya movement. Ironically, by neutralizing the ETUF, workers organized outside of the system, leading to the overthrow of the regime in 2011. In 1995, the Revolutionary Socialists party was founded, which continues to operate to this day.

== List of Egyptian socialist organizations ==
- Democratic Movement for National Liberation (1947–1955)
- Egyptian Communist Organisation (1948–1954)
- Egyptian Communist Party (1921–1923)
- Egyptian Communist Party (Raya Group) (1949–1958)
- Iskra (1942–1947)
- National Committee for Students and Workers (1945–1946)
- Progressive Liberation Front (1948–1950)
- Unified Egyptian Communist Party (1955–1957)
- United Egyptian Communist Party (1957–1958)
- Workers and Peasants Communist Party (1946–1958)
