= Egyptian Communist Party (1921) =

- Founded: 1921
- Dissolved: After 1923
- Ideology: Communism; Factions: Anarchism; Reformism; Social democracy Marxism–Leninism
- International affiliation: Comintern

The Egyptian Socialist Party (Arabic: الحزب الاشتراكي المصري) was the first socialist party in Egyptian history. Founded in 1921, the party included both Marxist, Anarchist and Reformist elements. It renamed itself to the Egyptian Communist Party in 1922 after joining the Comintern. It was forced underground following a government crackdown in 1924.

== History ==
Marxist ideas entered Egyptian political thought around the beginning of the 20th century. Salama Moussa was a member of the Fabian Society in England; his writings on socialism in 1913 are some of the first Arabic works on the topic. Unions and strikes emerged in Egypt as early as the 1880s, but worker militancy exploded during the 1919 Egyptian revolution. These strikes convinced Joseph Rosenthal to unite the existing unions and organize more workers. In late February 1921 in Alexandria, the Confederation Generale du Travail (CGT) [General Confederation of Labor] was formed, growing to almost 20 thousand members in 1923. In August 1921, the Egyptian Socialist Party was founded, uniting the socialists in Alexandria with an existing socialist society in Cairo. Members included the after mentioned Moussa and Rosenthal, as well as Mohammed Abdullah Anan, Hosni Al-Arabi and Yehiel Kossoy (also known by his pseudonym Constantine Weiss and Avigdor). The party platform was published on 29 August 1921 in Al-Ahram.

According to a Comintern report, the party had 467 due paying members out of a total of either 600 or 650, of which 152 were in Cairo and 54 in Alexandria. (Note: Other places include: El Mahalla El Kubra (60), Port Said (45), Zagazig (28), Tanta (26), Mansoura (23), Ismailia (18), Banha (12), Mit Ghamr (12) Beni Suef (10).) The party had two major committees, a central committee and an executive committee. The central committee had 15 members (11 native Egyptians and 4 of European origin) and had monthly meetings. The executive committee had 7 members (5 native Egyptians and 2 of European origin) and had weekly meetings. There was also a secret organization within the party composing of around of the members, whose goal was “to increase the Party’s fighting capacity, politically and organizationally; to establish communications with other revolutionary organizations within the country and abroad; to collect documents of a political nature; and other secret work.”

The party established a network of local branches in major cities around the country. It worked with local trade unions and took part in organizing strikes. From late 1921 to early 1922, eighty strikes occurred in fifty factories. The party used these strikes as an opportunity to recruit new members. They attempted to participate in May Day 1922, but a police raid in late April briefly stifled them. In response, the headquarters were moved from Cairo to Alexandria.

The party was split in between two factions, a nationalist group centered around Cairo and an internationalist group in Alexandria. It was the latter group that was in contact with the Comintern as early as 1920. Moussa was a part of the right wing of the party, favoring Egyptian nationalism above socialism. As he put it: "Our loyalty to Egypt must be stronger than our loyalty to socialism. Independence is our primary goal and socialism is secondary". Following a series of political infighting, he was expelled from the party on August 10 1922.

More infighting continued between Rosenthal and al-Arabi. After al-Arabi's return from Moscow to attend the 4th Comintern congress, he claimed that the Comintern demanded Rosenthal's expulsion. After more squabbling, Rosenthal resigned on 20 December 1922. The Egyptian Socialist Party officially became the Egyptian Communist Party of 25 January 1923 following its admission to the Comintern.

The Comintern demanded that the party participate in the upcoming elections and ally with the National Party. These elections saw an overwhelming victory for the Wafd party, a liberal nationalist party utterly opposed to communism. Following a series of strikes and factory takeovers in Alexandria in February 1924, the new Wafd government arrested the workers and many party members. From 1926 to 1931, the party was in chaos and split into several rival groups. Many Jewish communists who fled to the Soviet Union fell victim to the great purge. New Marxist societies were started by anti-fascist Jews in the 1930s. Communist organizations gathered more steam starting in World War II, such as Henri Curiel's DMNL and Hillel Schwartz's Iskra.

== See also ==
- Communist Party

== Sources ==
- Ginat, Rami (2014). A History of Egyptian Communism. Lynne Rienner Publishers. ISBN 9781588269591.
- Beinin, Joel; Lockman, Zachary (1998). Workers on the Nile: Nationalism, Communism, Islam, and the Egyptian Working Class, 1882-1954. American University in Cairo Press. ISBN 9789774244827.
- Ismael, Tareq Y.; El-Sa'id, Rifaʿat (1990). The Communist Movement in Egypt, 1920-1988. Syracuse University Press. ISBN 9780815624974.
- Kirasirova, Masha (1990). "An Egyptian Communist Family Romance: Revolution and Gender in the Transnational Life of Charlotte Rosenthal" (PDF). In Chatterjee, Choi; Marks, Steven G.; Neuburger, Mary; Sabol, Steven (eds.). The Global Impacts of Russia’s Great War and Revolution. Book 2: The Wider Arc of Revolution, Part 1. Slavica.
- Botman, Selma (1988). "The Roots of Egyptian Communism". The Rise of Egyptian Communism, 1939-1970. Syracuse University Press. ISBN 9780815624431.
- Bashear, Suliman (1980). Communism in the Arab East, 1918-1928. Ithaca Press. ISBN 9780903729550.
