= Egyptian Communist Party (ar-Rayat ash-Sha'ab) =

- Leader: Fuad Mursi; Ismail Sabri Abdullah
- Founded: 1949
- Dissolved: 1958
- Merged into: UECP
- Newspaper: ar-Rayat ash-Sha'ab
- Ideology: Communism; Marxism-Leninism
- Political position: Far-left

The Egyptian Communist Party (Arabic: الحزب الشيوعي المصري), often referred to as the Raya group after its publication ar-Rayat ash-Sha'ab (الراية الشعب, 'People's Banner'), was a communist party in Egypt founded in late 1949.

The party was led by Fuad Mursi and Ismail Sabri Abdullah, who both had studied in Paris and joined the French Communist Party there. When Mursi returned to Egypt in 1949, the party was founded (Abdullah returned to Egypt in 1951). Mursi opposed the influence of Jews within the Egyptian communist movement, and rejected the Democratic Movement for National Liberation (Hadeto) and its leader Henri Curiel. The Raya leadership argued that Jewish influence and sexual libertinism had led to the fall of Hadeto, and they Jews and women were barred from party membership (The prohibition for women to join the party was later gradually relaxed). The Raya group was the sole communist faction in Egypt at the time, in which Jewish communists did not participate. Being the smallest of the three main communist organizations in the country, the party had less than 100 members, mainly intellectuals. It worked completely clandestinely. The party had a disproportionate membership of Copts from Middle Egypt.

The party classified the government of Gamal Abdel Nasser as a 'fascist dictatorship'. It supported a two-state solution, peace with the State of Israel and the creation of an independent democratic Palestinian Arab state on the basis of the borders of the 1947 United Nations Partition Plan for Palestine. The party denounced the postures of the Unified Egyptian Communist Party (the successor organization of Hadeto) vis-à-vis the Nasser government as 'opportunist'. The Raya group was the first Egyptian communist group to call for support to Sudanese self-determination, and the party argued for the withdrawal of British and Egyptian military forces from the Sudan. The party proposed a voluntary, federal union between Egypt and Sudan.

By the mid-1950 the Raya group was particularly active in the student movement, and expanded its influence. At Ibrahim Pasha University Raya student leader Amr Moheddin led a joint sit-in protest June–July 1954 with the Muslim Brotherhood against the Anglo-Egyptian Evacuation Agreement.

By late 1956, unity talks began among the main factions of the Egyptian communist movement. A tripartite committee was formed between the Raya group, the Unified Egyptian Communist Party and the Workers and Peasants Communist Party, with Sa'ad Zahran representing the Raya group. The Raya group demanded that Jews be excluded from the leadership as a condition for merger. By June 1957 the Unified Egyptian Communist Party agreed to the Raya groups' terms, and the two parties merged to form the United Egyptian Communist Party. As the Unified Egyptian Communist Party had nominated four imprisoned members to the Central Committee, the erstwhile Raya group (who only nominated party members outside of prison) came to dominate the new Central Committee.
