= Amina Al Naqqash =

Amina al-Naqqash
- أمينة النقاش
- Born: Minyat Samannoud, Dakahlia, Dakahlia Governorate, Egypt
- Education: Cairo University
- Occupations: Journalist; Writer; Politician
- Known for: Leadership in the Tagammu Party
- Office: Editor-in-Chief of Al-Ahali; Assistant Secretary-General of the Tagammu Party; President of the Progressive Women's Union
- Political party: Tagammu
- Spouse: Salah Isa (m. 1977; death 2017)
- Relatives: Raja'a Al-Naqqash (brother)

Amina al Naqqash (Arabic: أمينة النقاش; born 1950) is an Egyptian journalist and writer, considered one of the most prominent female voices in the worlds of journalism and politics in Egypt. She is known for her leftist positions and her defense of democracy and public freedoms. She has held significant leadership roles in the National Progressive Unionist Rally Party (Tagammu) and its official newspaper, Al-Ahali.

== Life ==
Amina Abd al-Mumin Muhammad al Naqqash was born in 1950 in the village of Minyat Samannoud, in the Aga district of Dakahlia Governorate. She grew up in a household rich with science and culture and graduated from Cairo University. She was married to the prominent writer and historian Salah Issa, who worked at Al-Gomhuria newspaper. They first met in 1971 at the home of her brother, literary critic Rajaa al-Naqqash, and married in 1977. Their marriage initially faced opposition from Issa's family, particularly because at the time he had been dismissed from his job and was wanted for arrest due to his communist affiliations.

== Career ==
Throughout her career, Amina al Naqqash has been a central figure in Egypt's progressive movement. She is a founding member of the National Progressive Unionist Rally Party (Tagammu) and has held leadership positions within it, serving as the Assistant Secretary-General and a member of the Political Bureau. Her influence was projected through her role as Editor-in-Chief of Al-Ahali, the party's official newspaper. In addition to her political and journalistic work, she is the President of the party's Progressive Women's Union and an active member of the Egyptian Journalists' Syndicate.
