= Al-Jamahir =

Al-Jamahir (in Arabic الجماهير meaning The Masses) was an Arabic language weekly newspaper and the official organ of the Democratic Movement for National Liberation (Arabic: الحركة الديمقراطية للتحرر الوطنى, abbreviated حدتو, 'HADITU', French: Mouvement démocratique de libération nationale, abbreviated M.D.L.N), a communist organization in Egypt between 1947 and 1955.

Al-Jamahir was established in 1947 as the official organ of the HADITU. The organization published the legal weekly newspaper that had a regular circulation of 7-8,000, but the circulation occasionally peaked to around 15,000. Al-Jamahir played an important role in the growth of HADITU. Free copies of the newspaper were handed out to workers at factories, and the newspaper became an important rallying point to spread the influence of the movement amongst industrial workers. The newspaper had a relatively high journalistic standard, with photographic essays and industrial exposures.

HADITU supported the Egyptian Revolution and the 1952 coup d'état, being the only communist faction to do so. Several prominent figures in the Revolutionary Command Council and the Free Officers had links to HADITU.

Other communist groups voiced fierce criticism of the government following the violent suppression of a strike in Kafr Dawar and the execution of two workers accused of leading the strike. After the executions of the two labour leaders, HADITU and non-communist trade unionists agitated in the working-class neighbourhoods of Alexandria and Kafr Dawar (in vehicles, with loudspeakers, borrowed from the army) calling on workers to remain calm. The support to the government after the Kafr Dawar crackdown undermined the HADITU influence in the labour movement, and created internal rifts between the party and its trade union cadres.

In January 1953 the government closed down the legal press of HADITU and Al-Jamahir was suspended. In February 1955 HADITU merged with six other factions, forming the Unified Egyptian Communist Party.

== See also ==
- List of newspapers in Egypt
