= Al Police =

Egyptian magazine

Al Police Magazine
- Categories: Cultural magazine; Literary magazine; Social magazine
- Frequency: Monthly, later semi-monthly, then weekly
- Publisher: Police Officers' Club
- Founder: Saad El-Din Wahba
- First issue: 1950s
- Country: Egypt
- Language: Arabic

Al Police Magazine (Arabic: البوليس) was an Egyptian magazine issued by the Police Officers' Club following the 23 July 1952 revolution. Published during the 1950s, it began as a monthly magazine before becoming semi-monthly and eventually weekly.

The magazine was founded by screenwriter Saad El-Din Wahba while he was an officer in the army. The magazine covered various cultural, literary, and social topics. Among the writers who worked for the magazine were Rajaa Al-Naqash and Suleiman Fayyad. One of the magazine's illustrators was Mustafa Hussein.

== See also ==
- Rose al Yusuf (magazine)
