= Fatima Mahmoud =

Libyan poet (born 1956)

- Born: 1954; Tripoli
- Occupations: Poet, journalist, short story writer

Fatima Mahmoud (born 1954) is a Libyan poet, short story writer, and journalist.

== Biography ==
Fatima Mahmoud was born in 1954 in Tripoli. From 1976 to 1987, she worked as a journalist in Libya for media outlets including al-Fajr al-jadid, al-Usbuʻ al-thaqafi, and al-Jamahiriya. She relocated to Cyprus and founded a magazine about Arab women's issues called Shahrazad Al-Jadeeda (Modern Sharazade). She returned to Libya but chafed due to lack of freedom of speech under the Gaddafi regime, so she left the country again in 1995 and was granted political asylum in Germany. She published a collection of Arabic language poetry and English translations of her poems have appeared in The Poetry of Arab Women: A Contemporary Anthology (2001) and Poems for the Millennium, Volume Four: The University of California Book of North African Literature (2013).

== Bibliography ==
- Ma tayassar (What Is Possible, poetry). Tripoli, Libya: al-Dar al-Jamahiriya,1985.
