= Shuhdi Atiya ash-Shafi =

Egyptian Communist & Writer

Shudi Atiya ash-Shafi (Arabic: شهدى عطية الشافعى) was an Egyptian communist theoretician and activist. Ash-Shafi studied in Britain, and returned to Egypt in 1942 with a Master of Arts degree from Exeter College. After his return to Egypt he was employed at the Ministry of Education as an English-language supervisor. He joined the communist Iskra group, of which he became a prominent member. He went on to become director of the House of Scientific Research (a Marxist study centre set up by Iskra) for a period. In 1947 he became editor of the newspaper of the group, al-Jamahir. In the same year Iskra merged into the Democratic Movement for National Liberation (HADITU).

As HADITU passed through inner-party conflicts, ash-Shafi resigned from the movement towards the end of 1947. After leaving HADITU, ash-Shafi became an active advocate for greater unity in the Egyptian communist movement.

Ash-Shafi was arrested in a crackdown on leftist intellectuals, which had begun in January 1959. In 1960 he was beaten to death in the Abu Zabal prison camp.

== Bibliography ==
In 1957 a major work by authored by ash-Shafi was published, Tatawor Al-Harakah Al-Watanyah Al-Misryah, 1882-1956 ('Development of the Egyptian Nationalist Movement, 1882-1956'). It was republished in 1983.
