= Third World Forum =

Third World Forum (Forum Tiers Monde) is an international network of research centers. Third World Forum was established by the Egyptian economist and politician Ismail Sabri Abdullah in 1975. It is based in Dakar. It was among the organizations that helped to set up the World Forum for Alternatives, created in Cairo in 1997. Samir Amin was its co-founder.

== Goals and Activities ==
Third World Forum is composed of a network of intellectuals throughout Africa, Asia and Latin America, seeking to promote debate on contemporary processes and patterns of development. To this end, it conducts critical research on global capitalism, geo-politics, north–south relations, national and regional security, ecological degradation and formulates policy recommendations on alternatives. Its analyses and proposals are produced through interaction with social movements and civil society actors, with which it maintains a close connection.
