= Trade Union Committee for Popular Resistance =

Trade Union Committee for Popular Resistance was an Egyptian organisation of local labour committees, mobilised during the 1956 Suez Crisis for the sake of national defense. In total around 50 local committees were organised, some with hundreds of members. The main leader of the movement was Yusuf Darwish. The Egyptian government was however wary of the formation of workers militias, especially since the movement was influenced by communists. On November 26, 1956, the law office of Darwish was closed by the government (but was re-opened soon afterwards, following protests). The committees were disbanded soon after the end of the war.
