= Basma Hassan =

Egyptian actress (born 1976)

Basma
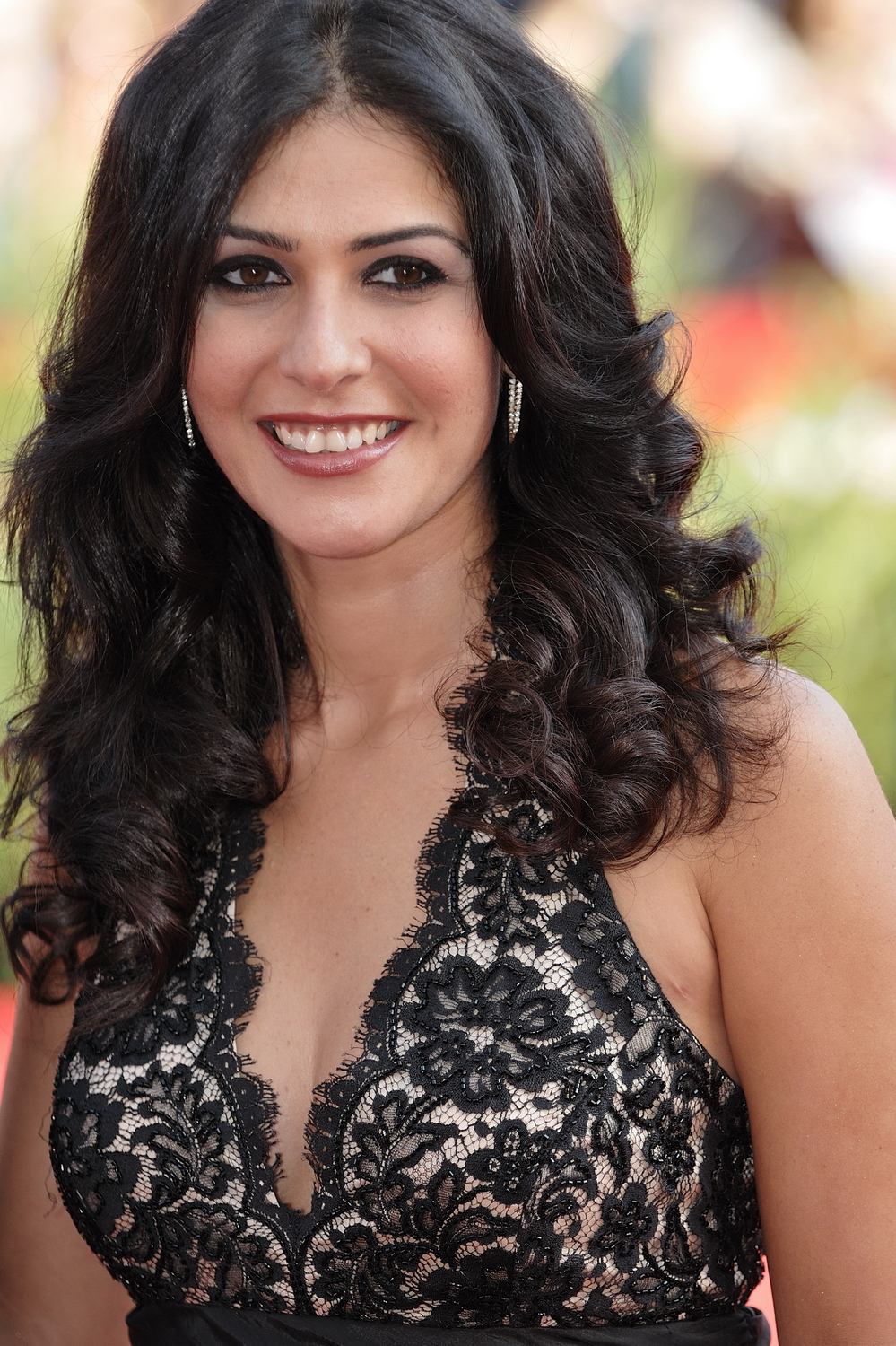
- Basma at the 2009 Venice Film Festival
- Born: Basma Ahmed Sayyed Hassan; June 5, 1975 (age 50); Cairo, Egypt
- Education: Cairo University
- Occupations: Actress, presenter
- Years active: 1997–present
- Spouse: Amr Hamzawy (m. 2012; div. 2019)
- Children: 1
- Relatives: Youssef Darwish (grandfather)

Basma Ahmed Sayyed Hassan (Arabic: بسمة أحمد سيد حسن; born June 5, 1975) is an Egyptian actress.

== Early life ==
Basma Hassan's father is a journalist and her mother is a women's rights activist. She is the maternal granddaughter of the late Youssef Darwish, an Egyptian Jewish lawyer and activist who converted to Islam. He was a dedicated anti-Zionist and communist. Basma studied English literature at the Cairo University.

== Career ==
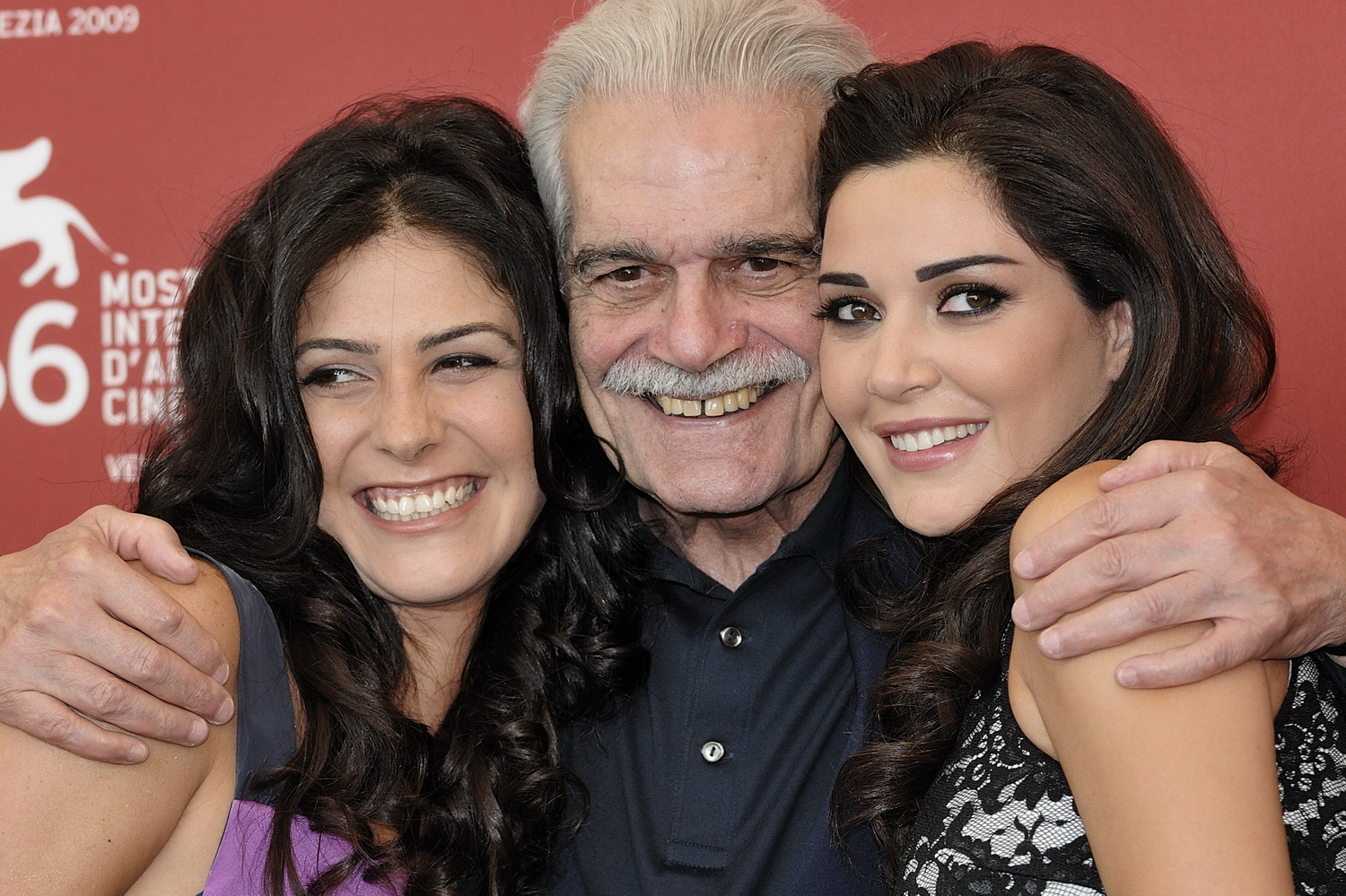
Basma (left), Omar Sharif and Cyrine Abdelnour

She began her career acting while studying at the university in the film "El Madyna (The City)" (1999) where the director Yousry Nasrallah chose her to participate in the film. Before acting, she tried to be a radio presenter and had already taken an interview in the national radio channel. But before anything, Yousry Nasrallah selected her for the movie "El Madyna (city)". Later on, she acted in the American TV series, Tyrant.

== Private life ==
On 15 February 2012, she wed political activist Amr Hamzawy, who was a Member of Parliament for the Freedom Egypt Party. The couple had a daughter, Nadia, but they separated in 2019.

== Filmography ==
- Rasael Al Bahr (Sea Messages), 2010
- The Traveller, 2009
- Zay El Naharda (Yesterday is a new day), 2008: May
- Morgan Ahmed Morgan, 2007: Alyaa
- Kashf hesab, 2007: Donia
- Le'bet El hobb (Game Of Love), 2006: Hanan
- The Night Baghdad Fell, 2005
- Harim Karim, 2005: Dina
- Men nazret ain (By a Glimpse of an Eye), 2004: Noody
- El Na'amah W El tawus (Ostrich And Peacock), 2002: Samira
- El Nazer, 2000
- The City, 1999: Nadia

== Awards ==
- Best actress award at the Motion Picture Association Festival for her role in "Zay El Naharda" (2009)
- Best actress award (Egyptian Cinema Awards) for her role in "Morgan Ahmed Morgan" (2008)
- Best actress award (Egyptian Cinema Awards) for her role in "Game of Love" (2007)
- Best actress award (Egyptian Cinema Awards) for her role in "The Night Baghdad Fell" (2006).
- Award of the "Lights of Safi" festival in Safi, Morocco (2006)
- Best new face and best actress awards in the Arab section of the Alexandria International Film Festival for her role in "Ostrich and Peacock" (2002)

== Resources ==
- "Basma" (in Arabic). El Cinema.
