= Jewish Anti-Zionist League =

Jewish Anti-Zionist League الرابطة الإسرائيلية لمكافحة الصهيونية
- Secretary: Ezra Harari
- Founded: 1946
- Dissolved: 1948
- Headquarters: Cairo, Egypt
- Ideology: Communism; Anti-Zionism; Anti-Racism; Anti-Colonialism
- Political position: Left-wing

Jewish Anti-Zionist League (French: Ligue Juive contre le Sionisme "Egypte", Arabic: الرابطة الإسرائيلية لمكافحة الصهيونية, romanized: ar-rabita al-israiliya li-mukafahat as-sahyuniya) was a political organization in Egypt. The organization had branches in Alexandria and Cairo. The League conducted militant agitations in the Jewish neighbourhoods of Cairo.

The League was formed in the summer of 1946 by Jewish members of the underground communist Iskra movement. The founding Secretary of the Jewish Anti-Zionist League was Ezra Harari. Other members of the founding committee of the League were Marcel Israel, Edward Mataloun, Hanzin Kasfelt and Edward Levy. Immediately after the founding of the organization, the members of the founding committee were arrested.

== Communist-Zionist clashes in Dahir ==
In April 1947 a violent clash erupted as between the League and Zionists, as disputes erupted over the election to the leadership in the Dahir Maccabi club. A slate of Zionist candidates won the election as result of manipulations and when the members of the Jewish Anti-Zionist League challenged the election outcome, the new club leadership called in police. In the clash, police forces sided with the Zionists and arrested the communists (considering the communists as a greater threat to public security than the Zionists). After the clash the communists reported the incident to the Wafdist newspaper Sawt al-Ummah.

On May 24, 1947, conflict again erupted at the Dahir Maccabi club, as Zionists refused the communists access to the building to celebrate May Day. Two days later another clash erupted at the club between Zionists and Jewish communists. Following these events, the League issued an editorial stating that Jewish schools were used for Zionist propaganda and that sports clubs used for Zionist organizing rather than sports activities.

== Positions ==
The ambitions of the Jewish Anti-Zionist League were twofold. On one hand, it sought to counter the Zionist influence within the Jewish community in Egypt. On the other hand, it sought to clarify to the Egyptian public that not all Jews were Zionists.

In May 1947, the League had published a declaration, distributed in French and Arabic, condemning Zionism as a tool for British imperialism and called for Jewish-Arab unity. The latter part of the declaration read

Jewish Men! Jewish Women!

Zionism wants to throw us into a dangerous and hopeless adventure. Zionism contributes to making Palestine uninhabitable. Zionism wants to isolate us from the Egyptian people. Zionism is the enemy of the Jewish people.

Down with Zionism! Long live the brotherhood of Jews and Arabs!

Long live the Egyptian people!

The League argued that displaced European Jews should be given the possibility to return to their home countries or third country of their choice, rather than sending them to Palestine.It also claimed that only an independent democratic Palestine would be able to break the bonds of colonialism and safeguard the Jewish people. The organization condemned Zionist terrorist activity in Palestine.

== Banning ==
In June 1947, the League was banned by the Egyptian Ministry for Social Affairs for "reasons of public security". Following the illegalization of the Jewish Anti-Zionist League, Harari founded the 'Forum Group'. The Forum Group was a Jewish anti-Zionist group within the Democratic Movement for National Liberation. According to contemporary British security reports, the Forum Group had a considerable following amongst the Jewish community in Cairo (Krämer does however question the accuracy of this estimate, stating that the group had a rather limited impact).

== See also ==
- Anti-Zionist League in Iraq
- Jewish anti-Zionism
