= Egyptian Communist Organisation =

The Egyptian Communist Organisation (Arabic: المنظمة الشيوعية المصرية, al-Munaẓẓamah aš-Šiūʿīah al-Miṣriyyah, abbreviated م.ش.م) was a political organisation in Egypt. The group emerged in mid-1948 as the Voice of the Opposition, following a split from the Democratic Movement for National Liberation. Voice of the Opposition published Sawt al-brulitaria (صوت البروليتاريا, 'Voice of the Proletariat'). In December 1948 the group merged with the group Toward Bolshevik Organisation, becoming the Egyptian Communist Organisation. It was dubbed as 'MISHMISH', a pejorative distortion of its acronym. Mishmish (مشمش) means apricot in Arabic.

The leadership of MISHMISH was almost exclusively Jewish, made up by former members of the Iskra group. Albeit the organisation adopted a '100% proletarian' line, most of its leaders came from wealthy backgrounds.

MISHMISH condemned the Egyptian military intervention in Palestine as a 'racist war'. It saw that war as a ploy of the Arab bourgeoisie, supported by imperialists, to divert the class struggle of Arab workers. The organisation called for Jewish self-determination in Palestine. In the view of MISHMISH Zionism would not be able to retain its dominance over Jewish politics in Palestine as the Jewish working class would be radicalised, and that Israel could develop into a socialist state.

In 1949 MISHMISH was one of the bigger communist splinter groups, with several hundreds of members. Its relationship to other communist groups was however very bad. MISHMISH routinely dubbed the other communist groups as police informers, blaming them for arrests of communists. Moreover, it began to label all other Egyptian communist groups as 'Titoists'.

In early 1949, two MISHMISH cadres were arrested in Alexandria. In August 1950 the Cairo-based leadership of the group (Sidney Solomon, Odette Solomon, Aslan Cohen, Miray Cohen and Mohamed Sid-Ahmed) was arrested. After the August 1950 arrests, the organisation became dormant. In 1954 it was dissolved, as the Solomon couple left Egypt.
