= Anti-Zionist League in Iraq =

Former anti-Israel Jewish group in Iraq

The Anti-Zionist League in Iraq (Arabic: عصبة مكافحة الصهيونية في العراق) was an organization in Iraq, active in 1946. The organization was founded by a group of Jewish members of the Iraqi Communist Party in 1945.

== Foundation ==
The petition to found the Anti-Zionist League was signed by eight individuals from Baghdad on September 12, 1945. The government approved the petition on March 16, 1946. Whilst the Communist Party was illegal at the time and the National Liberation Party (considered a front organization for the Communist Party) had been refused legal registration, the Iraqi government allowed the Anti-Zionist League to operate as a legal organization. The reason is said to have been that the government hoped to use the organization to represent Iraqi Jews towards the Anglo-American Commission of Inquiry on Palestine.

== Political line ==
The Anti-Zionist League sought to propagate amongst the Iraqi population to avoid confounding Jews with Zionism, as a measure to confront "communal hatred". Zionism was, according to the organization, a colonialist phenomenon. The Anti-Zionist League called for a fully independent Palestine, an Arab democratic government, end to land transfers to Zionists and prohibition of Zionist migration. According to the Anti-Zionist League British and U.S. imperialism was responsible for the rise in sectarian violence and nationalism.

== Leadership ==
Amongst the founders of the organization were Yahuda Siddiq (Central Committee member of the Communist Party) and Masru Qattan and Yusuf Zalluf. Yusuf Zhilkha headed the organization. Zakki Basim, a non-Jew, acted as the liaison between the organization and the Central Committee of the Communist Party.

== Membership ==
The organization was dominated by young Jewish communists. Jewish members of the Communist Party were required by the party to join the organization (those who did not could be accused of Zionist leanings). The membership of the Anti-Zionist League was, however, not exclusively Jewish and communist. There were also some Christian and Muslim members, and some of its members were Progressive Nationalists.

== Al-'Usbah ==
It published a daily newspaper al-'Usbah (العصبة, 'The League'), which had a circulation of 6,000 copies.

== Activities ==
During its three months of legal existence, the Anti-Zionist League organized twenty-two public meetings. In Baghdad up to 5,000 people could take part some of these meetings. Two public meetings were held in Basra, with thousands of participants.

== Ban ==
Al-'Usbah was banned in June 1946, shortly after its foundation. The organization was declared illegal by the Iraqi government in July 1946. Members of the organization were arrested and charged with the crime of Zionism.

== See also ==
- Jewish Anti-Zionist League
