= Youssef Darwish =

Egyptian labour lawyer, activist and communist

- يوسف درويش
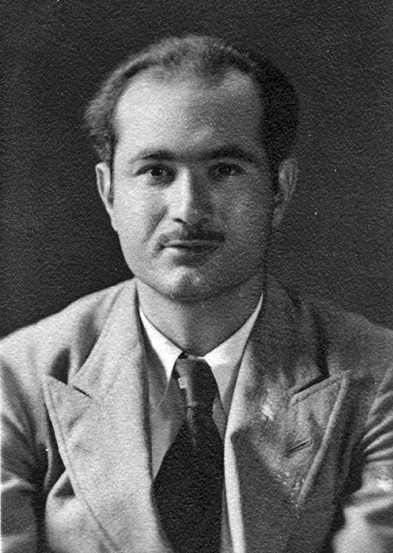
- Born: 2 October 1910; Abbassia, Khedivate of Egypt
- Died: 7 June 2006 (aged 95); Cairo, Egypt
- Education: University of Toulouse
- Occupations: Lawyer, activist
- Relatives: Basma Hassan (granddaughter)

Youssef Darwish (Arabic: يوسف درويش; 2 October 1910 – 7 June 2006) was an Egyptian labour lawyer, communist and activist. During his years of political activism, he was frequently accused of communist subversion and imprisoned, spending around 10 years of his life in jail. Of Jewish background, he converted to Islam in 1947. He was one of the few from the Karaite Jewish community to remain in Egypt after the establishment of Israel in 1948.

== Early life ==
Darwish was born in 1910 in Abbassia, a neighbourhood of Cairo in the Khedivate of Egypt, to a Jewish jeweller, Moussa Youssef Farag Darwish, whose family belonged to the minority Karaite Jews, a community which comprised the rich and diverse mosaic of Egyptian Jewry. Karaite Jews were simultaneously multilingual and highly integrated in the Egyptian community at that time; most families spoke French and Arabic at home and sent their children to bilingual schools. Some families spoke Greek, Russian and Turkish as well. Darwish graduated from a prestigious French high school in Cairo, the École des frères, in 1929. He earned a degree in law from the University of Toulouse in 1932. In Toulouse, Darwish was first exposed to Marxist literature and became engaged in the local cell of the French Communist Party.

== Career ==
In 1934, Darwish returned to Egypt and started his career as a labour lawyer and political organizer. Together with two other Egyptian Jewish activists - Ahmad Sadiq Sa'd and Raymond Douek- he cofounded a new secret Egyptian communist organization and a magazine known as Al Fajr Al Jadid (Arabic: لفجر الجديد) or the New Dawn, that was linked to many trade unions. By the mid-1940s, Darwish had become the legal representer to 67 of Egypt's then 170 labour unions, for which he worked with minimal or no fees.

In 1946, Darwish co- founded the Workers Committee for National Liberation (WCNL), the first formal Marxist organisation in Egypt. WCNL was an anti-imperialistic movement that demanded ending the British occupation of Egypt, liberation of the Egyptian economy from foreign influence, development of the Egyptian economy, nationalization of all monopolies including the nationalization of Suez Canal and other health, educational and political reforms such as voting rights for women and expansion of civil liberties. WCNL later turned to the "Workers and Peasants Communist Party (WPCP)" and then fused with other communist organizations at the time in the "Communist Party of Egypt (CPE)" (Arabic: الحزب الشيوعى المصرى), which then split into CPE and HADETU.

In 1958, the former Egyptian president Gamal Abdel Nasser arrested and jailed all known communist activists, including Darwish. He remained in prison for 6 years, during which he was frequently beaten and tortured. After his release, he became a secretary for the International Association of Democratic Lawyers (IADL) . He was rearrested again in 1973 during President Sadat's regime: imprisoned for 3 months for communist agitation, he subsequently left Egypt for 13 years to live in Algeria and Czechoslovakia. After returning to Egypt in 1986, he worked in supporting and advising the Center for trade Union and Workers Services in Helwan.

== Views on Zionism, Jews in Egypt, and Jewish exodus ==
In 1947, Darwish joined a group called Jews against Zionism. In an interview with Al-Ahram Weekly two years before his death, he told the reporter, "We denounced the establishment of a Jewish homeland in Palestine but the government closed us down while Zionist organisations continued to function freely". In another interview, he stated that there was no discrimination against Jews in Egypt prior to 1948. But as the State of Israel was established, many Egyptian Jews began to worry and the Jewish exodus began. He claimed that "sequestration wasn’t a general rule applied to all Jews, but a measure imposed after 1956 primarily on French and British Jews and those who were suspected of having ties to Israel" and that it wasn't until after the 1967 war that the majority of the 10,000 Jews who had stayed behind began to leave.

== Personal life and death ==
The Egyptian actress Basma is Youssef Darwish's granddaughter.

Darwish died on 7 June 2006 in Cairo, Egypt.

== See also ==
- Trade Union Committee for Popular Resistance
