= General Federation of Labour Unions in the Kingdom of Egypt =

General Federation of Labour Unions in the Kingdom of Egypt (GFLUKE) was a federation of trade unions in Egypt. GFLUKE was founded on March 1, 1938. In the year of its foundation, GFLUKE was the largest trade union organisation in Egypt. At the time of its foundation, GFLUKE consisted of 32 trade unions from the Cairo area,. The core behind the founding of GFLUKE consisted of the Commission to Organise the Workers Movement and the group around Abbas Halim. Many of the founding members of GFLUKE had been active in the National Federations of Trade Unions in Egypt (1930–1935). In some ways, GFLUKE was a continuation of NFTUE.

Abbas Halim became the president of GFLUKE, Muhammad Yusuf al-Mudarrik vice-president and Muhammad Hasan Amara general secretary. GFLUKE had a policy of independence from political parties. Towards the government, the organisation employed a pragmatic approach.

Soon after the foundation of GFLUKE, the federation was divided into two camps. The core issue of contention was the role of non-workers in the labour movement. Halim promoted the engineer Ahmad ad-Damardash as-Shanadi as new GFLUKE president, a candidacy that al-Mudarrik opposed. In the end as-Shanadi became GFLUKE president, and Halim became the zaim (leader) of GFLUKE.

In 1939, GFLUKE raised the demand for the adoption of a legislation on the right to form trade unions. A group of trade union officials, led by al-Mudarrik, went on an indefinite hunger strike on June 12. The hunger strike, whilst failing to convince the government to adopt such a legislation, became highly publicised.

In the fall of 1939, a wave of layoffs affected the workers in Egypt, parallel to staggering cost of living and decline in real wages. GFLUKE launched protests against the layoffs, demanding government action. The country being under martial law, the government responded by curtailing the abilities of GFLUKE to function. In the end, the federation headquarters were closed down by police. The organisation ceased to function effectively, and by 1941 it was dissolved.
