= Ismail Sabri Abdullah =

Egyptian economist and politician (1924–2006)

Personal details
- Born: 1924 Mallawi, Kingdom of Egypt
- Died: 6 November 2006 (aged 81–82)
- Party: French Communist Party; Communist Party; National Progressive Unionist Party
- Spouse: Gulpery Aflatoun
- Education: Cairo University; Sorbonne University
- Awards: Order of the Republic; French Order of Merit

Ismail Sabri Abdullah, also known as Ismail Sabri Abdallah, (Arabic: إسماعيل صبري عبد الله, romanized: Ismāʻīl Ṣabrī ʻAbd Allāh; 1924 – 6 November 2006) was an Egyptian economist and politician who held some cabinet posts in the early 1970s. He was the cofounder of the Communist Party and was imprisoned several times due to his Communist activities and views.

== Early life and education ==
Abdullah was born in Mallawi, Minya, Egypt, in 1924. He was a graduate of the Faculty of Commerce at Cairo University. He also graduated from Sorbonne University with a PhD in political economy.

== Career and activities ==
Abdullah joined the French Communist Party while studying in Paris. He was a cofounder of the Communist Party which he headed with Fuad Mursi. Following his graduation, Abdullah joined Alexandria University where he worked as a lecturer between 1951 and 1954. He became a faculty member of Cairo University in 1954 and worked there until 1956. One of his pupils at Cairo University was Hazem Bablawi.

Abdullah was an advisor to the Economic Development Organization from 1957 to 1959. Then he headed the Dar Al Maarif Publishing House between 1965 and 1969. He was named as the director general of the Institute of National Planning in 1969 and was appointed minister of planning in 1971. During his tenure he also headed the Institute of National Planning. He was made minister of state for planning in 1972 which he held until 1975. Abdullah was removed from office due to his inability to present a well-established plan to the foreign investors. One of his main activities during his ministerial term was the negotiations about the American aid packages. Abdullah was the last member of the Egyptian leftist technocrats serving in the Egyptian government.

After leaving office Abdullah joined the National Progressive Unionist Party. Although he was assigned to many public posts, he was imprisoned several times between 1955 and 1964 under the presidency of Gamal Abdel Nasser due to his Communist political leaning. Abdullah was again arrested in September 1981 and was released later. Fuad Mursi was also imprisoned with him in the latter incident. An appeal was issued by the Association of Third World Economists in protest over their and others' arrest.

Abdullah founded the Third World Forum in 1975 and headed it for a while.

=== Work and views ===
Abdullah published books on economy and new world order. His books were mostly published by a publishing company headed by Mohamed Fayek.

During the 1970s and 1980s Abdullah analysed the Chinese economic model to offer a solution to the economic development of the Arab world.

== Personal life and death ==
Abdullah was married to Gulpery Aflatoun whom he met in Paris during his doctorate studies in the 1940s. He died on 6 November 2006.

=== Awards ===
Abdullah was the recipient of the Order of the Republic (1974) and of the French Order of Merit (1975).
