= Workers and Peasants Communist Party =

The Egyptian Workers and Peasants Communist Party was a communist party in Egypt, active between 1946 and 1958.

The party originated as a clandestine cell, using the name Popular Vanguard for Liberation (Arabic: الطليعة الشعبية للتحرير) or Tasht after its Arabic acronym, founded in September 1946. The founding nucleus of Tasht were Raymond Duwaik, Youssef Darwish, Ahmed Rushdi Salih and Sadiq Sa'ad, who had been members of the Workers Committee for National Liberation – Political Organisation for the Working Class. They set-up the organization after the suppression of the newspaper ad-Damir ('The Conscience'), the organ of the Workers Committee for National Liberation. Per the testimony of Sa'ad, the founding congress of Tasht elected a three-member Central Committee consisting of Sa'ad (Political Officer), Duwaik (Organizational Officer) and Mahmud al-Askari (Recruiting Officer). The founding congress defined two key strategic objectives; to elaborate an Egyptian path to socialism and to build unity with other revolutionary sectors.

Organizationally Tasht adhered to democratic centralism and the activities of Tasht were divided into three cells, one for political activity, one for organizational questions and one for mass work and recruitment. Sa'ad served as the general secretary of Tasht 1946–1948. Rushdi served as general secretary 1948–1951. Abu Saif Yusuf served as general secretary 1951–1957. The organization issued two publications; al-Hadaf ('The Goal') as an internal bulletine and Kifah ash-Sha'ab ('People's Struggle') as its mass publication.

Tasht later changed its name to Popular Democracy (الديمقراطية الشعبية, ad-dimoqratiyyah ash-sha'abiyyah, abbreviated "D.Sh") in 1949. In the early 1950s, Popular Democracy merged with a faction of the People's Liberation Movement (the faction that had not merged with Iskra). The united organization took the name Workers' Vanguard (طليعة العمال). At the time of the July 1952 Revolution Workers' Vanguard was one of the three main communist groupings in Egypt. Darwish recruited several trade union leaders to Workers' Vanguard. Workers' Vanguard was active among textile workers in Shubra El Kheima.

By late 1956, unity talks began among the three main factions of the Egyptian communist movement. A tripartite committee was formed between the Raya group, the Unified Egyptian Communist Party and the Workers and Peasants Communist Party, with Helmi Yassin representing the Workers' Vanguard group. But the Workers' Vanguard was hesitant to a merger, as its leaders had very strong reservations against Henri Curiel (whom they saw as pro-Zionist). Moreover, unity between the three factions was complicated by the insistence of the Raya group that Jews be excluded from the leadership of the united party, whilst the Workers' Vanguard had Jewish presence in its leadership (such as Sa'ad, Duwaik and Darwish).

In March 1957 the Workers' Vanguard held its second congress, changing the name of the organization to the Egyptian Workers and Peasants Communist Party (حزب العمال والفلاحين الشيوعي المصري, hizb al-'umal wa al-falahin ash-shiu'i al-masri, abbreviated "'A.F."). This was the first time the organization publicly identified itself as communist. The name change indicated a softening of the resistance of the party towards a merger with other communist groups. But unity remained complicated as the party rejected the Raya group's demand of exclusion of Jews from party leadership as racist. Following its second party congress, the party also began softening its stringent membership criteria, and in the midst of the 1957 Egyptian parliamentary election campaign the party expanded its membership rapidly among workers. This recruitment drive made the party outgrow the other communist groups in size.

The merger of the Workers and Peasants Communist Party and the United Egyptian Communist Party finally materialized, merging into the Egyptian Communist Party on January 8, 1958.
