= Salama Moussa =

Egyptian newspaper editor (1887-1958)

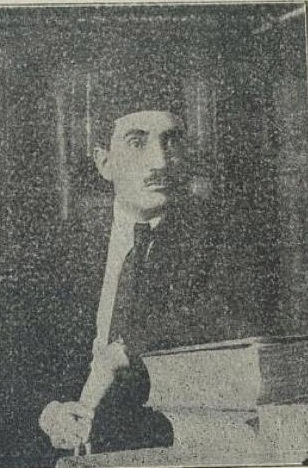
- A photo from 1924, aged 37.
- Born: 1887; Cairo, Egypt
- Died: 4 August 1958 (aged 71); Cairo, Egypt
- Occupation: Journalist
- Writing career
- Notable work: Man at the Top of Evolution

Salama Moussa (or Musa; 4 February 1887 – 4 August 1958) (Arabic: سلامه موسى pronounced [sæˈlæːmæ ˈmuːsæ]) was an Egyptian journalist, writer and political theorist. Salama Moussa was an avowed secularist, he introduced the writings of Darwin, Nietzsche, and Freud to Egyptian readers. Salama Moussa campaigned against traditional religions and urged the Egyptian society to embrace European thought, he espoused the theory of evolution by natural selection. He was an Egyptian nationalist. He was an advocate of liberalism and a supporter of the Egyptian liberal movement. Salama Moussa is from Taha Hussein's generation; Naguib Mahfouz called Salama Moussa his "spiritual father", whereas Salama Moussa acknowledged his own intellectual debt to Ahmed Lutfi el-Sayed. Salama Moussa joined al-Wafd party after Saad Zaghloul became the leader, he believed it to be essentially a call to independence. He looked for political and economic independence of Egypt from the British occupation. He popularised the idea of socialism in Egypt and advocated egalitarian socialism. He was jailed in 1946 for criticizing the monarchy. Salama Moussa emphasized the unity of the Egyptians, he praised Ahmed Lutfi el-Sayed for "paving the way for the revolution of 1919 by uniting the Egyptian nation on a national stance".

== Early life ==
Salama Moussa was born in 1887 into a Coptic family in a village called Kafr al-Afi near Zagazig, Egypt. His family is originally from a small village called el-Baiadeye, in Asyut, Upper Egypt. His father died when Salama Moussa was still a young child, leaving the family an inheritance that allowed them to live comfortably. Salama Moussa attended a Muslim kuttab, a Coptic school, and a government school, then in 1903 he moved to Cairo to receive a secondary education. The Khedivial secondary school where Moussa attended, from 1903 to 1907, was run like a military camp with harsh punishment for misbehavior dished out by the British instructors. In Cairo during the early 20th century there was a rising anti-British sentiment rooted in the nationalist movement, and Qasim Amin's movement for the liberation of women was creating a stir. While in Cairo, Moussa was exposed to writers such as Farah Antun, Jurji Zaydan, and Ahmad Lutfi Al-Sayyid that discussed modern and at the time radical ideas such as Social Darwinism, women's rights, and nationalism. Growing up in a religious minority in Muslim dominated Egypt he was attracted to these ideas. After secondary school Moussa was interested in studying European literature and science, he was unable to study Arabic at a higher level, because the study of Arabic was the monopoly of the Azhar and Dar al-‘Ulum, both of which required students to be Muslim.

== His travel to Europe and other activities ==
In 1907, Moussa traveled to France to continue his education and he was exposed to a modern, secularized Europe rampant with socialist ideologies. Moussa observed the empowerment and social freedoms that French women enjoyed. In Montlhéry, a small village near Paris, he started studying socialism and evolution, and the French language.

Moussa studied Egyptian civilization upon his return to Egypt in 1908. The same year he published articles in Al Liwa, a newspaper published by Mustafa Kamil Pasha. In 1909 he moved to England to improve his knowledge of the English language, and briefly studied law at Lincoln's Inn. In England, socialism was on the rise as well as ideas of Social Darwinism, and Moussa had a lot of interactions with members of the Fabian Society and became a member in July 1909. Moussa embraced Fabian ideas of getting rid of the landed classes and empowering the peasant, and he wanted to realize them in Egypt.

In 1910, he wrote his first book, Muqaddimat al-superman, comparing European life with the lives of the Egyptians and the social injustices they faced on a daily basis. In 1913, Salama Moussa returned to Egypt and started his first weekly magazine, Al-Mustaqbal, with Farah Antun and Yaqub Sarruf on topics such as evolution, national unity, and socialism. The British-controlled government responded to these radical ideas by shutting down the magazine after 16 issues. Moussa then spent the following years teaching in a village near Zagazig and observing peasant living conditions.

The 1920s were an active time for Moussa as well as Egypt and were considered a revolutionary period in culture and literature; Moussa formed a socialist party, which was promptly dissolved under pressure and intimidation by the government. In the same year, he proceeded to establish the Egyptian Academy for Scientific Education, which was, after only 10 years of operation, shut down by the government as well. Moussa worked as a managing editor of a magazine, Kull shay, which was published in Cairo from 1925 to 1927. In 1929 he started his magazine Al Majalla Al Jadida which existed until 1944. Moussa also contributed to Al Siyasa, newspaper of the Liberal Constitutional Party.

In 1936, he proclaimed that socialism would sweep Egypt before he turned 100 years old. He spent a brief stint as editor for the social affairs ministry. In 1942, Moussa was jailed on charges of sabotage, which were trumped up charges for criticizing the monarchy.

== Revolution of 1952 ==
The 1952 revolution was a turning point in Egyptian history where Nasserism was taking hold and nationalization of Egypt had begun. Salama Moussa remained an important figure during this period and was appointed supervisor of the science section in Akhbar el-Yom, a position that he held until his death in 1958.

== Legacy ==
In the 1930s Salama Moussa affirmed his belief in a shared humanity and was an advocate of secularism, democracy, liberalism, and the liberation of women. He criticized the status of Egyptian women amongst both Christian and Muslim Egyptians, and called for the improvement of their role in Egyptian life. He stated that none of his sisters were educated, and they were all forced to stay home at age 10. His outspokenness on women's issues was shown in many of his works including his 1955 work al-Mar'a laysat lu'bat al-rajul (women are not the toys of men).

Salama Moussa supported workers' and peasants' rights, supported an improved working environment, and called for reforms in public education. Seminars led by Moussa discussing social issues drew large crowds of young intellectuals. He was one of the Egyptian intellectuals that called for the Egyptian dialect to be taught as the official language. Moussa pleaded in his book Ha'ula'i 'allamuni (Those inspired me, Cairo, 1953) for the independence of thought and indigenous creativity of the contemporary Egyptians. Salama Moussa emphasized the unity of the Egyptians, he praised Ahmed Lutfi el-Sayed for "paving the way for the revolution of 1919 by uniting the Egyptian nation", he praised the unity and resilience of the Egyptian people both in the revolution of 1919 and the revolution of 1879–1882.

Salama Moussa looked for political and economic independence of Egypt from the British occupation, to this end he corresponded with Gandhi who provided him with his tools of economic struggle against the British hegemony over the Indian textile industry. Moussa made use of his contact with Gandhi in helping out the national Egyptian industrialist Tala'at Harb (1867–1941) to set up independent outlets for the Egyptian textile industry nationwide in Egypt, an attempt that was vehemently resisted by the British colonial powers of the time. In 1935 he formed Jam'iyyat al-Misri li al-Misri (The Society of the Egyptian for the Egyptian) to introduce Gandhi's idea of national self-sufficiency into Egypt.

Salama Moussa wanted Egypt to embrace European thought and to abandon religious traditions and customs. Salama Moussa advocated secularism and scientific thought. He wrote or translated 45 published books. His writings are still influential in Egypt and are frequently cited.

Salama Moussa became seriously ill and died on 4 August 1958, a few months after turning 71.

== Publications ==
- Divine Thoughts and Their Origin (1912)
- Treatise about Socialism (1913)
- The Most Well-known Love Affairs in History (1925, revised and renamed Love in History around 1949)
- Reading Matters on Elections (1926)
- Dreams of a Philosopher (1926)
- Freedom of Thought and Its Representatives (1927)
- Secrets of the Inner Life (1927, revised in 1948)
- History of Art and the Most Well-known Pieces of Work (1927)
- Today and Tomorrow (1928)
- Descent and Development of Mankind (1928, revised in 19523)
- Stories (1939)
- About Life and Culture (1930, revised and renamed in 1956: Culture and Life)
- Our Duties and the Tasks of Foreign Countries (1931)
- Gandhi and the Indian Revolution (1934)
- Renaissance in Europe (1935, in 1962 posthumously revised and renamed What Is Renaissance)
- Egypt, a Place Where Civilization Began (1935, expanded edition in 1948)
- The World in 30 Years (1936)
- Modern English Culture (1936, expanded ed. in 1956)
- Our Life as from 50 (1944, expanded ed. in 1956)
- Freedom of Thought in Egypt (1945, this piece of work clearly shows, how much Salama Moussa was influenced by the European culture, in particular by Voltaire.)
- Eloquence and the Arabic Language (1945, expanded ed. in 1953 as well as posthumously in 1964)
- My and Your Intellect (1947, expanded ed. 1953)
- The Years of Salama Moussa's Apprenticeship (1947, posthumously expanded 3ed. in 19589 This piece of work is of the first renowned autobiographies of the Arabic Language Area)
- The True Path of the Young People (1949)
- Psychological Attempts (1953, changed to Attempts in 1963)
- These are My Mentors (1953, among them a very obstinate discussion on Goethe's works, posthumously expanded ed. in 1965)
- The Book of Revolutions (1955)
- Psychological Studies (1956)
- The Woman Is not the Plaything of the Man (1956, a very early dispute about the liberation (emancipation) of the woman at that time, especially in the orient)
- George Bernhard Shaw (1957, who he has met and got to know in England, posthumously expanded ed. in 1977)
- Attempts of the Young People (posthumously 1959)
- Forbidden Writings (posthumously 1959)
- Mankind is the Pride of Creation (posthumously 1961)

== See also ==
- Ahmed Lutfi el-Sayed
- Taha Hussein
- Saad Zaghloul
- Naguib Mahfouz
- List of Egyptian authors
- List of prominent Copts
