= Progressive Liberation Front =

The Progressive Liberation Front (Arabic: جبهة التحرير التقدمي, commonly known by its acronym 'جات', Gat) was a small communist organization in Egypt. The organization emerged in 1948 as a split from the Democratic Movement for National Liberation (HADITU). Leaders of Gat included Issamuddin Jilal, Ahmed Taha, Ismail Jibr, Salah Salma and Ehia al-Mazsi.

Gat merged with HADITU-Revolutionary Action, but Gat was reconstituted when HADITU-Revolutionary Action ceased to function. In 1950, Gat rejoined HADITU but remained a separate fraction of the Egyptian communist movement during various years of the 1950s. Ahmed Taha was the sole Gat member on the Central Committee of HADITU.
