= Workers Committee for National Liberation (Egypt) =

The Workers Committee for National Liberation – Political Organisation for the Working Class (Arabic: لجنة العمال للتحرير القومى- الهيئة السياسية للطبقة العاملة, abbreviated 'WCNL') was a militant anti-imperialist labour organisation in Egypt. The emergence of WCNL was part of an ongoing radicalization and upsurge of the national movement in Egypt 1945–1946.

== Founding ==
WCNL was founded by a group of trade unionists linked to the communist al-Fajr aj-Jadid ('The New Dawn') group. WCNL was constituted at a 3-day meeting held in the residence of Yusuf Darwish in mid-September 1945. Eight persons attended the meeting, but only the six that were workers signed the founding declaration.

== ad-Damir ==
WCNL acquired a lease for the publishing license of an existing weekly newspaper, ad-Damir ('The Conscience'), to function as the organ of WCNL. Mahmud al-Askari (who was the general secretary of the General Union of Mechanised Textile Workers in Shubra Al-Kheima and Cairo) became the editor of the newspaper whilst Taha Saad Uthman (who was president of the GUMTWSKC) became the secretary of its editorial board. Both had taken part in the founding of WCNL. The first copy of ad-Damir published by WCNL came out in September 1945.

== Publication of WCNL programme ==
One of the founding members of WCNL, Yusuf al-Mudarrik, travelled to Paris for the 1945 founding congress of the World Federation of Trade Unions. Al-Mudarrik had been chosen to represent 102 labour unions, with a combined membership of around 80,000. At the congress he distributed English and French versions of the WCNL programme. The programme had a nationalist and anti-capitalist profile and called for the expulsion of all British troops from Egypt, land reform, and nationalizations. The programme stated that it was the task of the working class to lead this struggle. The WCNL programme was published in Egypt on October 8, 1945, one day after martial law was lifted. WCNL distributed 15,000 copies of the programme, plus 25,000 copies of an accompanying statement.

== Development ==
The programme and political discourse of WCNL was well received in the Egyptian trade union movement. However, the group was unable to expand its membership. Some prominent trade union leaders felt that the WCNL nucleus had excluded them from the founding of the new organization.

Initially the Egyptian government tried to co-opt the WCNL. The organisation was reportedly offered a substantial sum of money if a government protege was appointed editor of ad-Damir. When the WCNL refused, repressive measures were used against the organisation.

== Shubra El-Kheima strike and government crackdown ==
In December 1945 a textile workers strike broke out in Shubra El-Kheima, in response to an occupation by army and police forces of the area. The government accused the WCNL of leading the strike. Around 600 workers were arrested as police and army forces tried to break up the strike. Al-Mudarrik, Uthman and al-Askari were arrested on January 2, 1946. The government dissolved the textile workers union in Shubra El-Kheima. Ad-Damir ceased publication in January 1946. The three WCNL leaders would remain in jail until May 30 the same year.

The government crackdown on WCNL paralysed the organisation and broke the influence of al-Fajr al-Jadid in the trade union movement. Following the arrests to the WCNL leaders another faction, the Egyptian Movement for National Liberation, became the most prominent communist group amongst the Egyptian workers.
