= United Egyptian Communist Party =

- Founded: 1957
- Dissolved: 8 January 1958
- Merger of: UECP; Raya Group
- Merged into: ECP
- Ideology: Communism; Marxism-Leninism
- Religion: Far-left

The United Egyptian Communist Party (Arabic: الحزب الشيوعي المصري المتحد) was a political party in Egypt. The party was founded in 1957 (Sa'id and Ismail states that the founding took place in February 1957, Joel Beinin states that the merger took place in June 1957), through the merger of the Unified Egyptian Communist Party and the Egyptian Communist Party (ar-Rayat ash-Sha'ab faction). At the time of the merger a declaration was issued, calling for unity for national revolution amongst the Egyptian communists, working class and national bourgeoisie and for defense of the government of Gamal Abdul Nasser. The declaration also stated that the party would seek unification with the Workers and Peasants Communist Party at a later stage.

On January 8, 1958, the merger with the Workers and Peasants Communist Party was completed, forming the Egyptian Communist Party.
