= Hillel Schwartz =

Jewish Egyptian politician (1923–2007)

Hillel Schwartz (13 February 1923 – 1 August 2007), an Egyptian Jew, was the founder of the Iskra ('al-Sharara') party, a small Communist political party which was one of the Egyptian political groupings advocating full independence from Great Britain before the Egyptian Revolution of 1952. Iskra was a vanguardist party, which "emphasized the need for the mobilization of a revolutionary reserve of Marxist consciousness and intellectuals in order to establish a sound base from which popular activity could follow."

== Early life ==
Born in Egypt in 1923, Schwartz's father was a Jew who had immigrated to Egypt from Romania.
