= Al Fajr Al Jadid =

Political magazine in Egypt (1945–1946)

- Categories: Political magazine
- Frequency: Biweekly; Weekly
- Founder: Al Fajr Al Jadid Group
- Founded: 1945
- First issue: 16 May 1945
- Final issue: July 1946
- Country: Egypt
- Based in: Cairo
- Language: Arabic

Al Fajr Al Jadid (Arabic: الفجر الجديد, romanized: al-Fajr al-Jadid, lit. 'The New Dawn') was a leftist magazine which was published in the period 1945–1946. Although the magazine was short-lived, it is one of the sources that laid the basis of the regime change in Egypt in 1952.

== History and profile ==
The first issue of Al Fajr Al Jadid appeared on 16 May 1945. The founders and contributors of the magazine were called the Al Fajr Al Jadid group and included Ahmad Sadiq Saad, Raymond Duwayk, Yusuf Darwish and Ahmad Rushdi Salih who was the editor-in-chief of the magazine. They were Marxist political figures and artists. The magazine aimed at producing a version of the leftist views and practices specific to Egypt. It was started as a biweekly publication, but its frequency was switched to weekly from 1 November 1945. The frequent topics featured in the magazine were social issues such as poverty, underdevelopment and agrarian reform. It also covered literary and cultural writings and advocated the committed literary approach which would also be supported by the Lebanese literary magazine entitled Al Adab. Articles in Al Fajr Al Jadid were published in standard Arabic not in colloquial Arabic.

Al Fajr Al Jadid was distributed to nearly all Arab countries and enjoyed support and financial assistance of the Marxist organizations based in Palestine, Syria, Lebanon and Iraq. It was also financed by the Soviet Union.

Al Fajr Al Jadid openly attacked significant cultural figures of the period, including Tawfiq Al Hakim, Abbas Al Aqqad, Ibrahim Al Mazini and Taha Hussein, for living in their ivory towers and having close connections with capitalists and colonizers. The magazine also harshly criticized the British and other Western imperialist powers and claimed that British imperialism was the major reason for the deficiencies of Egypt.

Initially Al Fajr Al Jadid was not critical towards the Egyptian government, but became much more ardent opponent of the government soon which led to its closure in July 1946 by the government led by Prime Minister Ismail Sidky.
