= Salah Isa =

Egyptian journalist and writer

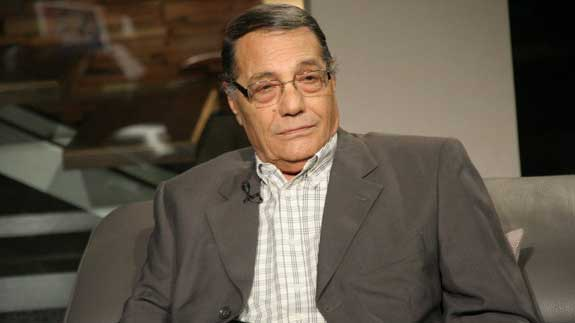
- Born: October 14, 1939; Bechla, Dakahlia governorate, Egypt
- Died: December 25, 2017 (aged 78); Cairo
- Occupation: Journalist

Salah Isa (1939–2017) was an Egyptian journalist and historian in left-wing politics.

== Biography ==
Salah Isa was born on October 14, 1939, in the village of Bashla in the Dakahlia Governorate. Salah Issa grew up in what was described as a “mosaic of thought" environment: his father was a Fida'i, and his uncle belonged to Liberal Constitutional Party, the Liberal Constitutionalists, while his other uncle joined the Muslium Brotherhood, his mother was illiterate she does not know how to write neither read however she kept owning books, And when Salah Isa grew up, he used to read to her "The Lives of the Prophets " books. It is said that in his childhood he hated Truman, Churchill, the geography teacher, and Bevin, the British Foreign Secretary. He read by Arsene Lupine, Al-Manfaluti and Taha Hussein, as he read in a poorly-printed, ornately styled book about the killing of Muawiyah bin Khadeej by Muhammad bin Abi Al-Siddiq.

In 1948 he left his village to Cairo. It was said that his professor at the Higher Institute for Undergraduate Studies, in his early stages, add him in the family of the "Al tallea" magazine, the mouthpiece of the Left-wing politics of Egypt, but he refused, and he was suspended for 6 months.

He obtained a Bachelor's degree in social service in 1961. and preside for five years a number of social units in the Egyptian countryside. He began his life as a short story writer, then in 1962 he headed to write about history, political and social thought. He devoted himself to journalism since 1972 for Al-Jumhuriya newspaper.

He founded and participated in establishing and managing the editing of a number of newspapers and magazines, including writers, the national culture, the people, the left and the journalists, and later headed the editor of the Cairo newspaper Issued by the Egyptian Ministry of Culture Which then the Minister of Culture Farouk Hosni transformed it from a periodical magazine into a weekly cultural newspaper Salah Issa was also the authorized representative for the Syndicate of Journalists and a member of its board of directors in the nineties of the twentieth century. He held the position of Supreme Secretary General of the Press.».

Abdallah alsnawi wrote about Salah Issa and his role in Al-Ahali newspaper, Al-Ahali newspaper held its editorial responsibility for seven years After the assassination of past President Anwar Sadat in 1981, it was The most influential, influential and respected Egyptian newspaper he was the only star undisputed. However During the assassination of the president Mubarak, (Al ahaly) found that it is enough courage to assume the responsibility of expanding the opposition's margin to unusual limits. It gained the confidence of public opinion, and its distribution reached more than (150) thousand copies

Salah Isa is a dad for one daughter Sawsan Issa who is a professor at the Faculty of Engineering, Cairo University She is the wife of Abdel Wahed Ashour, managing editor of the Middle East News Agency

== Arrest ==
Salah have was arrested for the first time in 1966 because of his political views in writings comprehensive theoretical analysis of the march of the July 23 revolution after 14 years, University education "The Revolution between Path and Destiny, which coincided with the visit of two prominent thinkers of France; And the stoning of Sirte, his face, and the stoning of Sirte, his destination. Cairo responded and Salah Issa and others were released from prison on the sidelines of Sartre's visit to Egypt in February 1967.

He was repeatedly arrested, arrested, interrogated, or interrogated in his trial for several years between 1968 and 1981.

== Literary career and directions ==
He published his first book "The Arab Revolution" in 1979 The book – according to Ahmed Mansour –it is An attempt to understand and do justice to this historical phenomenon, the "Urabi Revolt" through the scientific socialist method, away from the harsh judgments and harsh accusations it was subjected to by the other two approaches, the colonial school and the national school. Salah Issa discusses and monitors in his study of the Urabi Revolution (through several chapters) "European monopolies from peaceful occupation to armed conquest, the social and intellectual map of the revolution, the issue of power, and finally the revolutionary front from unity to fragmentation." The book came in 612 pages, and Issa relied in writing on the memoirs of the leaders of the Urabi Revolution and a number of Egyptian, English and French historical documents.

Salah Issa also reviews in his book "People with Wonder" (issued by Nahdet Misr in 2010) 50 figures from the Egyptian political, cultural and artistic elites who played a remarkable role in Egyptian public life during the second half of the twentieth century. Among those personalities: King Farouk – Fathi Radwan – Abdul Rahman Al-Rafi'i – Fouad Siraj Al-Din – Mustafa Bahjat Badawi – Taha Hussein – - Hassan Al-Banna – Abdul Rahman Al-Sindi – Hassan Al-Hudhaibi – Akram Al-Hourani – Dr. Murad Ghalib – Abdel Nasser and Abdel Hakim Bloody Friendship – Muhammad Hassanein Heikal – July Revolutionaries – Abdel Latif Al-Baghdadi – Ahmed Bahaa El-Din – Boutros Ghali – Fouad Morsi – Lotfi Al-Khouli – Noman Ashour – Mohamed Sayed Ahmed – Youssef Idris – Abdel Azim Anis – Latifa Al-Zayat – Youssef Wahbi – Youssef Al-Sibai – Karam Mutawa – Farid Shawqi.

In his book Men of Ria and Sakina he was able to narrate the fact of what happened literally in Ria and Sakina story in an accurate press manner, by looking into and researching old books," and dealing with the event realistically and without adding a comedic, tragic or dramatic character, as was done in other works that covered the case.

According to MS Mahmoud Salah Issa belonged to a generation of historians, described in academic writings as "the generation of amateur historians" and included with him another historian, Tariq al-Bishri, and "they were freed together from the rigid academic writing methods, but they were not freed from its conditions of investigation and scrutiny." During the second half of the sixties, "Al-Tali’a" and "Al-Kateb" magazines played a remarkable role in presenting this literary production and "crystallizing it in a context appropriate to the changes that Egypt was going through at that time."

In an interview in 2017, Salah Issa argued the existence of what he called "the League of Tyrants Makers" in every era and time, and that it "seeks to besiege the ruler and isolate him from the nation and legitimate institutions, and to impart holiness to him." He said: “They are now present in Egypt, whether they are ideological groups. Or institutions, comprising multiple groups of beneficiaries, and have been promoting in Egypt for a long time and still the idea of a just tyrant with every new ruler, an idea that has been proven wrong by experience and leads to disasters in a world where there is no longer a place for individual rule. And the attempts of this association continue with President Sisi, but I think he is fully aware of it, because the system of one opinion is no longer able to survive and withstand in the world of the communications revolution and the one global village, so I imagine that no matter what they do, they will not achieve their goals after two great revolutions."

== Works ==
He has published more than 20 books and numerous articles on history, political and social thought and literature, including:

- Tabarij Greg, Madbouly Bookshop, Cairo, 1988.
- The Poet of Disturbing Public Security: The Judicial Files of the Poet Ahmed Fouad Negm: Study and Documents, Dar Al-Shorouk, for Cairo, 1999.
- Theocratic issue in the class and national perspectives, the Arab future. Mg. 1, p. 1 (May 1978), p. 57–67.
- Intellectuals and military: Reviews, experiences and testimonies about the state of the intellectuals under the rule of Abdel Nasser and Sadat, Madbouly Library, Cairo, 1986.
- The Egyptian bourgeoisie and the game of expulsion outside the ring, Dar Al-Tanweer, Beirut, 1982.
- Nizar Qabbani in the poets of the Nakba and Al-Sata, 1995.
- The trial of Fouad Siraj El-Din Pasha: When Nasser's revolution put Saad Zaghloul and Mustafa al-Nahhas in the dock, Madbouly bookshop, 1983.
- The Egyptian Bourgeoisie and the Bargaining Style, Ibn Khaldoun House, Beirut, 1979.
- The Men of Marj Dabiq (The Story of the Ottoman Conquest of Egypt and the Levant), Dar Al-Fatty Al-Arabi, Beirut, 1983.
- Halawani's Gate and Revealing the Beginnings in Drama, 1995.
- Constitution in the Dustbin, Cairo Institute for Human Rights Studies, Cairo, 2001.
- Holographic History, 1995.
- For the catastrophe that threatens us, Madbouly Library, Cairo, 1987
- To the question that no one answered, 1995
- Men of Raya and Sakina: A Political and Social Biography, Al Karma Publishing, Cairo, 2016, The book "Riyan and Sakina’s Men" is among the most famous – if not the most famous – of Salah Issa's books.
- Tales from the notebook of the homeland, Dar Al-Shorouk, Cairo, 2011.
- A collection of certificates and documents to serve the history of our time, Dar Al-Hilal, Cairo, 2006.
- Tales from Egypt, Cairo House, 1983.
- Riots: Disambiguation and Disengagement, 1997.
- History Turns to Dim Prohibitions, 1995.
- Civil Associations and the New Law, El Mahrousa Center, Cairo, 1999.
- Margins of Al-Maqrizi, Cairo House, 1983.
- A joint statement against time, Sina Publishing, Cairo, 1992.
- Characters who are amazing, Nahdet Misr for Printing, Publishing and Distribution, Cairo, 2010.
- The Princess and the Mandarin, Dar Al-Shorouk, Cairo, 1999.
- Death outside the institution, 1995.
- The death of the commissioner of al-Badari, the General Authority for Cultural Palaces, Cairo, 2011.
- Parliamentary Republic: A Pillar of Political and Constitutional Reform, Cairo Institute for Human Rights Studies, 2011.
- goodbye, Zaman: Troubles and Concerns of an Arab Journalist in the Eighties, Al Karma Publishing, Cairo, 2019.

== Death ==
He died on Monday, December 25, 2017. The state institutions and their opposition alike mourned Salah Issa, as the Supreme Media Council, the Information Authority, the National Press Authority and the Journalists Syndicate referred to his national contributions that “affected In political life, he was a trade unionist who defended the freedom of the press. The Committee for the Defense of the Independence of the Press said in a statement that with the departure of the writer Issa, "the press group has lost one of the most important and prominent defenders of the profession over the past decades."

At the end of 2019, the National Organization for Urban Harmony included Salah Issa's name in the "Live Here" project, in honor of the names of creators across generations.

The book “Tales from the Notebook of Salah Issa” was published in 2021 by Dar Shams for Publishing and Media, by journalist writers Muhammad Al-Shamma and Hajar Salah. The book is located in 200 pages of large pieces. The book presents an intellectual, cultural and historical biography of the writer. His work as Chris' editor for the Cairo newspaper, and a chapter on the story of his acceptance as editor-in-chief of a newspaper speaking the mouth of the Egyptian Ministry of Culture, which some denounced as "one of the opposition's symbols." The chapter was titled "Did he really sell the case?" Salah Isa, politician and journalist, through testimonies from Hussein Abdel Razek, Helmy Shaarawy, Hassan Badawy, Ayman al-Hakim and others.

Despite his death in December 2017, Salah Issa was the best-selling writer during the 2021 session of the Cairo International Book Fair, as many publishing houses competed to republish his books or discover other books he completed and did not publish.
