= Raja'a Al-Naqqash =

Egyptian journalist

Mohammed Raja'a Abdel Mo'min Al-Naqqash (Arabic: رجاء النقاش), often referred to simply as Raja'a Al-Naqqash, was an Egyptian literary critic, intellectual, and journalist. A graduate of the Department of Arabic Language in Cairo University. Raja'a became a journalist, then editor, covering the modern literary scene of Egypt during its most formative years. He retired in 2008, continuing to write actively on literary topics he had focused on throughout his career.

== Works ==
- Original Works
  - ʻAbāqirah wa-majānīn (عباقرة ومجانين) Geniuses and Nutcases
  - Taʼammulāt fī al-insān
  - Abū al-Qāsim al-Shabbī : shāʻir al-ḥubb wa-al-thawrah : dirāsat wa-mukhtārāt
  - Ṣafaḥāt majhulah fī al-adab al-ʻArabī al-Muʻāṣir
  - al-Inʻizālīyūn fī Miṣr : radd ʻalá Luwīs ʻAwaḍ wa-Tawfīq al-Ḥakīm wa-ākharīn
  - Lughz Umm Kulthūm, wa-kalimāt ukhrá
  - ʻAbbās al-ʻAqqād bayna al-yamīn wa-al-yasār
  - Maḥmūd Darwīsh : shāʻir al-arḍ al-muḥtallah
  - Thalāthūn ʻāman maʻa al-shiʻr wa-al-shuʻarāʼ : dirāsāt
  - Fī ḥubb Najīb Maḥfūẓ / Rajāʼ al-Naqqāsh
  - Qiṣṣat riwāyatayn : dirāsah naqdīyah wa-fikrīyah li-riwāyat Dhākirat al-jasad wa-riwāyat, Walīmah li-aʻshāb al-baḥr; maʻa baḥth ʻan athar al-ḥizbīyah al-siyāsīyah fī al-adab
  - Najīb Maḥfūz : safaḥāt min mudhakkirātihi wa-aḍwāʼ jadīdah ʻalá adabihi wa-ḥayātih
  - نزار قباني : أجمل قصائدنا العربية / تقديم محمد عبد المنعم ؛ المشاركون رجاء النقاش
- Translations
  - Victoria, written in Hebrew by Sami Michael
