= Unified Egyptian Communist Party =

- Founded: February 1955
- Dissolved: June 1957
- Merger of: Democratic Movement for National Liberation, other organizations
- Merged into: United Egyptian Communist Party
- Newspaper: Dar al-fikr Kifah ash-sha'ab
- Ideology: Communism; Marxism-Leninism
- Political position: Far-left

The Unified Egyptian Communist Party (Arabic: الحزب الشيوعي المصري الموحد) was a political party in Egypt. The party was founded in February 1955 through the merger of the Democratic Movement for National Liberation (HADITU) and six splinter organizations (including HADITU-Revolutionary Tendency, an-Najm al-Ahmar, an-Nuah and Communist Vanguard). The talks regarding the merger were held without the HADITU leader Henri Curiel (in exile in Paris) being aware of them. Once the merger was finalized Curiel and HADITU leader Kamal Abd al-Halim (a close associate of Curiel) were excluded from membership in the new party. Curiel and Abd al-Halim were allowed to enter the party in 1956, and after the 1956 war Curiel was included in its Central Committee.

The Unified Egyptian Communist Party was largely supportive of the government of Gamal Abdul Nasser. One of its main competitors in the Egyptian communist movement, the ar-Raya faction, repeatedly criticized this stand. Furthermore, ar-Raya criticized Curiel's role in the Unified Egyptian Communist Party, branding it a direct continuation of the old HADITU.

The party favoured a peaceful settlement of the conflict with Israel, but were largely supportive of the anti-imperialist positions of Nasser. The party identified American imperialism as the driving force behind the conflict, and Israel as the key imperialist force in the region. Notably, Curiel differed with the party regarding the analysis of the regional conflict. He had retained the old HADITU view, blaming Arab reactionaries for the 1948 war. The party sought to open relations with the Israeli Communist Party in 1956, but the Israeli party never replied to the request (considering the Unified Egyptian Communist Party outside the limits of communist political orthodoxy). During the 1956 Suez War, the party mobilized popular resistance activities in Port Said.

The Unified Egyptian Communist Party opened a publishing house, Dar al-fikr, in early 1956. In April 1956 the party issued a report, labelled "Imperialism is the principal enemy". The report called for the support to Nasser's government, and to defend it against imperialist intrigues. Whilst expressing criticisms regarding limitations on democratic freedoms in Egypt, the party subordinated these demands for the sake of constructing anti-imperialist unity.

Towards the end of 1956, the three main communist factions in Egypt (the Unified Egyptian Communist Party, ar-Raya and the Workers and Peasants Communist Party) began talks regarding unification of the Egyptian communists. The talks were assisted by a representative of the Italian Communist Party (Velio Spagno) and a representative of the Iraqi Communist Party (Amr Abdullah). During the talks, the ar-Raya group demanded that Jews be excluded from the leadership of the unified party. The Workers and Peasants Communist Party and the followers of Curiel opposed this demand. The majority of the Unified Egyptian Communist Party did however cede to the demand, and in June 1957 the party and the ar-Raya group merged to form the United Egyptian Communist Party. Curiel's exile 'Rome Group' was disbanded in October 1957 by the new party.

== Organs ==
The party issued an underground newspaper, Kifah ash-sha'ab ('People's Struggle'). Furthermore, the exile Rome Group of Curiel published a French translation of Kifah ash-sha'ab, as well as an Arabic monthly bulletin (Kifah ash-shu'b ash-sharq al-awsat) and a French bulletin (Nouvelles d'Egypte).
