= Iskra (Egyptian communist organisation) =

Iskra (Arabic: الشرارة, ash-Sharara) was a communist organization in Egypt. Iskra was founded in 1942 by Hillel Schwartz. In the initial phase of its existence, the membership of Iskra was a small group of less than 100. The name refers to Russian revolutionary newspaper Iskra.

The followers of Iskra were, like the supporters of other Egyptian communist factions, active inside the Wafdist Vanguard (see Wafd). Iskra emphazised studies of Marxist theory and its application in Egyptian society. Iskra's approach was that the first task of the communists was to build a base among revolutionary intellectuals, and that mass mobilisation would follow at a later stage.

In 1944 Iskra established a study centre, Dar al-abhath al-'ilmiya (دار الأبحاث العلمية, House of Scientific Research). The centre published literature and gave classes on communist thought. Iskra was one of the forces behind the foundation of the National People's University in 1945, an institution that provided courses in politics and social sciences for labour activists.

In February 1946, Iskra was one of the groups that organised the National Committee of Workers and Students, a mass movement for national independence and social reforms. The National Committee lasted until July the same year.

In 1947 the organisation began publishing the newspaper al-Jamahir (الجماهير, 'The Masses'). Shudi Atiya ash-Shafi was the director of the House of Scientific Research and later the editor of al-Jamahir. Ash-Shafi had been the first Egyptian Muslim to become part of the Iskra leadership. That same year Iskra merged with the Egyptian Movement for National Liberation (HAMITU) to form the Democratic Movement for National Liberation.

== Social profile ==
In comparison to other contemporary communist organisations in Egypt, the membership of Iskra largely consisted of intellectuals. Like all communist groups, the cadres were mainly urban and based in the Cairo area. A large number of the Iskra cadres were Europeanised Jews or belonging to other European minorities. Many of the Iskra activists belonged to the upper strata of Cairo society, and were often recruited from the Lycée Français du Caire. The recruitment was often done through arranging parties and social events. In 1945, Iskra had a membership of about 900. 40% of them were foreigners.

Notably the Jewish members of the Iskra leadership took a more militant anti-Zionist approach than the non-Jewish cadres. Around 1946/early 1947 they formed the Jewish Anti-Zionist League.

It was in Iskra that the first female communists were organized in Egypt. Some of the first women cadres were Latifa az-Zayyat, Soraya Adham, Fatma Zaki, Inge Aflatun, Aimée Setton and Odette Hazan Solomon.

The Iskra group soon got the reputation of being a haven for sexual libertinism. In fact the anti-communist discourse in Egypt at the time, which was centered around claims that the communist movement was morally depraved and dominated by Jews, was largely based on the reputation of the Iskra group. Other communist factions became harshly critical of Iskra, especially the role of women in the organisation. Henri Curiel, leader of HAMITU, criticized Iskra for organizing parties as a tool for political recruitment.
