= Democratic Movement for National Liberation =

1947–1955 communist organization in Egypt

Democratic Movement for National Liberation الحركة الديمقراطية للتحرر الوطنى
- Leader: Henri Curiel
- Founded: 1947
- Dissolved: 1955
- Merged into: UECP
- Newspaper: al-Jamahir
- Youth wing: Communist Student League
- Membership (1952): 2,000-3,000
- Ideology: Communism; Marxism; Revolutionary socialism

The Democratic Movement for National Liberation (Arabic: الحركة الديمقراطية للتحرر الوطنى, abbreviated حدتو, HADITU, French: Mouvement démocratique de libération nationale, abbreviated M.D.L.N.) was a communist organization in Egypt from 1947 to 1955. HADITU was led by Henri Curiel. The movement followed the line of the National Democratic Revolution.

== History ==
HADITU was founded in July 1947 through the merger of two communist factions, the Egyptian Movement for National Liberation and Iskra. Soon after the foundation of HADITU, the organization had a membership of around 1,400, being the largest communist organization in Egypt at the time.

HADITU published a legal weekly newspaper, al-Jamahir (الجماهير, 'The Masses'). Al-Jamahir had a regular circulation of 7-8,000, but the circulation occasionally peaked to around 15,000. Al-Jamahir played an important role in the growth of HADITU. Free copies of the newspaper were handed out to workers at factories, and the newspaper became an important rallying point to spread the influence of the movement among industrial workers. The newspaper had a relatively high journalistic standard, with photographic essays and exposés about industrial conditions. The paper was closed in 1948 under martial law provisions that the Egyptian government enforced at the start of the 1948 Arab–Israeli War.

In early 1948 Curiel presented the paper "The Line of National and Democratic Forces" to the HADITU Central Committee, a document that became an important point of reference in the organization. The document contained criticisms against the earlier leadership and political line of the Egyptian communist movement.

HADITU had a student front, the Communist Student League. HADITU also led the Preparatory Committee for an Egyptian Students Federation.

HADITU went through a series of splits. One of the first groups to break away was the Revolutionary Bloc, led by Shudi Atiya ash-Shafi (He had left after not being included in the HADITU Central Committee as the movement was reorganized. Ash-Shafi argued that HADITU had a bourgeois outlook). In April 1948 two HADITU splinter groups, Toward a Bolshevik Organization and Voice of the Opposition, merged to form the Egyptian Communist Organisation. Other HADITU splinter groups included Toward an Egyptian Communist Party (NAHSHAM) and the Progressive Liberation Front. Leaders of Gat included Issamuddin Jilal, Ahmed Taha, Ismail Jibr, Salah Salma and Ehia al-Mazsi.

In the wake of the January 1950 election in Egypt, the political climate was normalized somewhat. The more open political environment enabled HADITU to work more effectively and expand its influence. HADITU was the most effective political force in the workers movement at the time, playing a leading role in various trade unions.

In the summer of 1950, Curiel was expelled from Egypt. Curiel was classified as a "foreigner", although he had held Egyptian citizenship for 15 years. In exile, Curiel settled down in Paris where he formed a HADITU branch of Egyptian-Jewish émigrés. The group became known as the 'Rome Group'. The Rome Group was able to secure some financial supplies to HADITU and translated HADITU documents into French and circulated them in Europe. While Curiel formally remained a HADITU Central Committee member, he no longer played any role in the decision-making of the organization. He was not consulted on any major matters.

HADITU supported the 1952 coup d'état, being the only communist faction to do so. Several prominent figures in the Revolutionary Command Council and the Free Officers had links to HADITU. RCC member Yusuf Siddiq was a member of HADITU. Another RCC member, Khalid Muhyi ad-Din, had briefly been affiliated to HADITU in 1947. Whilst not a RCC member, HADITU member Ahmed Hamrush was a prominent figure in the Free Officers Movement. HADITU member Ahmed Fu'ad, a military judge, acted as a liaison between HADITU and Gamal Abdel Nasser. However, in retrospect it appears that HADITU overestimated its influence over the RCC. The RCC also contained followers of the Muslim Brotherhood, and neither HADITU nor the Brotherhood were in control over the revolution.

Toward the end of 1952, HADITU had around 2,000-3,000 members.

Other communist groups expressed fierce criticism of the government for its violent suppression of a strike in Kafr Dawar and the execution of two workers accused of being the leaders of the strike. After the executions of the two labour leaders, HADITU and non-communist trade unionists agitated in the working-class neighbourhoods of Alexandria and Kafr Dawar (in vehicles, with loudspeakers, borrowed from the army), but called on workers to remain calm. The support to the government after the Kafr Dawar crack-down decreased HADITU influence in the labour movement, and internal rifts developed between the party and its trade union cadres.

In January 1953 the government closed down the legal press of HADITU. The Communist Student League took part in militant protests against the government, but this was rebuked by HADITU. HADITU reversed its policy of not criticizing the government in August 1953, as the government launched a crack-down on communist groups on the advice of the American embassy in Cairo.

1953–55 was a period of disarray in HADITU. The organization was weakened over disputes on how to relate to the regime. The movement had difficulties in handling the rising Pan-Arabist nationalism. One sector favoured supporting the government, due to its pan-Arab orientation in foreign policy. In September 1954 there was a major crackdown on the organization, and 25 of its cadres were arrested. In the same year Joyce Blau, who had functioned as the courier between Curiel's Rome Group and the party in Egypt, was arrested. With her arrest, communication between the party in Egypt and the exiles was cut off.

Curiel's role has been considered contentious. In September 1952, the French communist daily L'Humanité published an article accusing Curiel of having had contacts with a Trotskyist informer during the Second World War. When HADITU attempted to conduct unity discussions with other communist factions, the issue of Curiel's membership (being tainted by the accusations in L'Humanité) became a stumbling block.

In February 1955 HADITU merged with six other factions, forming the Unified Egyptian Communist Party. The Rome Group was not consulted or informed on the merger (although, once Curiel heard of the merger he and the rest of the Rome Group supported it). As the merger went through, the memberships of Curiel and HADITU leader Kamal Abd al-Halim (a close associate of Curiel) were suspended.
