= Khadiga Riad =

Egyptian painter (1914–1981)

- خديجة رياض
- Born: Khadija El-Alailly; 1914; Cairo, Sultanate of Egypt
- Died: 1981 (aged 66–67)
- Other names: Khadija Riyad, Khadija Riad, Khadiga Riyad
- Education: College de La Mere de Dieu
- Occupations: Painter, sculptor, jewelry designer
- Known for: Painting
- Movement: Surrealism
- Relatives: Ahmed Shawqi (grandfather)

Khadiga Riad (Arabic: خديجة رياض; 1914–1981), was an Egyptian painter, sculptor, and jewelry designer. She was the first Egyptian woman to exhibit abstract artwork, and was associated with the surrealist movement. Riad has many variations in the spelling of her name in English, including Khadija Riyad, and Khadiga Riaz.

== Early life and education ==
Khadiga Riad was born in 1914 in Cairo, Sultanate of Egypt (now Egypt). She was the daughter of Hamed El-Alailly, and granddaughter of poet, Ahmed Shawqi.

Between 1950 until 1955, she studied under Armenian painter Ashot Zorian, and also attended Collège De La Mère De Dieu in Cairo. At some point she changed her surname from Riaz (or Riyad), to Riad.

== Career ==
In the late-1930s, Riad had opened her home for a meeting location for the Art et Liberté group of artists, which included Georges Henein, Ramses Younan, Fouad Kamel, and Kamel el-Telmissany.

Her paintings were abstract, with layers of paint to create a texture. In the mid-1960s she started designing jewelry, and made her own version of ancient Egyptian "mummy beads".

Riad represented the Egypt (then known as the United Arab Republic) with her paintings in various art biennials, including at the Venice Biennale (in 1960, 1966), the Alexandria Biennale (in 1957, 1959, 1968), and the Exposition Universelle, Montreal. Her awards included third prize at the Alexandria Biennale (1959); and first prize for her painting in a national Egyptian competition.

In 1974, her work was shown in a group exhibition of Arab artists at the National Arts Centre in Ottawa. In 2017, Riad's work was part of the 9th annual group exhibition, "Contemporary Views" was held at the Al-Masar Gallery for Contemporary Art in Cairo.

== See also ==
- List of Egyptian women artists
