= London Bulletin =

Arts magazine in London (1938–1940)

- Editor-in-chief: E. L. T. Mesens
- Categories: Arts magazine
- Frequency: Monthly
- Publisher: Arno Press; Bradley Press
- Founder: London Gallery
- Founded: 1938
- First issue: April 1938
- Final issue Number: June 1940; 18–20
- Country: United Kingdom
- Based in: London
- Language: English
- OCLC: 7419596

London Bulletin was a monthly avant-garde art magazine which was affiliated with the London Gallery between April 1938 and June 1940. It was one of the most significant surrealist publications.

== History and profile ==
The plans to launch the magazine began following the international surrealist exhibition in London in 1936. The magazine was first published in April 1938 with the title London Gallery Bulletin. It was renamed as London Bulletin from the second issue. It came out monthly, and its publisher was the Arno Press based in London. Later the Bradley Press became its publisher. The magazine was financed by Roland Penrose.

London Bulletin regularly published the pamphlets of the exhibitions presented at the London Gallery. It frequently featured reproductions of surrealist paintings and poems of the surrealists. The manifesto of an Egyptian anarchist post-surrealist group, Art et Liberté (Art and Freedom), was published in the magazine in English in 1938. The group members were Anwar Kamel, Ramses Younan and Kamel el-Telmissany who would launch a magazine, Al Tatawwur, in Cairo in 1940. In the document entitled "Long Live Degenerate Art!" they objected to the Nazis' views on "degenerate art" and the Marxists' notion "that modern society looks with aversion on any innovative creation in art and literature which threatens the cultural system on which that society is based, whether it be from the point of view of thought or of meaning." London Bulletin folded before World War II, and its last issue, numbered 18–20, appeared in June 1940. The same year the London Gallery was also closed.

London Gallery News, a small newspaper, was the successor of London Bulletin.

== Editors and contributors ==
E. L. T. Mesens was the editor-in-chief. Humphrey Jennings contributed to the first two issues of the magazine and then began to work with Gordon Onslow Ford as an assistant editor to Mesens. Roland Penrose served as the assistant editor from issue 8/9 published in January 1939 and was replaced by George Reavey from issue 11 dated March 1939.

Major contributors of London Bulletin included Herbert Read, Samuel Beckett, Eileen Agar, John Banting, Conroy Maddox, the French Paul Éluard, André Breton, and Francis Picabia, as well as Belgian surrealist writer Marcel Mariën. Pictures by photographer Lee Miller appeared in several issues.

== See also ==
- List of avant-garde magazines
