= Inji Aflatoun =

Egyptian painter (1924–1989)

- Born: 16 April 1924; Cairo, Egypt
- Died: 17 April 1989 (aged 65); Cairo, Egypt
- Known for: Painting
- Movement: Art and Freedom Group

Inji Aflatoun (also spelled as Efflatoun, Arabic: إنجي أفلاطون; 16 April 1924 – 17 April 1989) was an Egyptian painter and activist in the women's movement. She was a "leading spokeswoman for the Marxist-progressive-nationalist-feminist movement in the late 1940s and 1950s", as well as a "pioneer of modern Egyptian art" and "one of the important Egyptian visual artists".

== Early life ==
Aflatoun was born in Cairo in 1924 into a traditional Muslim family she described as "semi-feudal and bourgeois", her father, Hassan Efflatoun, was an entomologist and a landowner, their last name, meaning Plato, was a nickname that had replaced their original family name of Kashef. Her mother, Salha, divorced Hassan at eighteen and raised Inji and her older sister Gulpérie. She was a French-trained dress-designer and she served in the Egyptian Red Crescent Society women's committee. Aflatoun's early awareness of gender and social inequality was shaped in part by the life of her mother, Salha Efflatoun. Married at fourteen and divorced at nineteen, the same year Inji was born. Salha faced significant social and economic challenges. In 1936, she became one of Egypt's pioneering female entrepreneurs by founding the country's first fashion house, Maison Salha. Backed by nationalist banker Talaat Harb, the business promoted locally produced textiles and represented a new model of female independence through creative labor and nationalist economics. Inji Aflatoun went to school first at the Catholic school Le Collège du Sacré-Coeur. At this school she felt restricted and began to notice social injustice feeling that "there was not even equality before God." At fourteen she transferred to another school where she discovered Marxism at the Lycée Français du Caire . During her time there she was also exposed to students of different backgrounds and learned of the French Revolution and Napoleon's invasion of Egypt and it's impacts on the upper class in Egypt. She became more militant in her actions and increasingly questioned the division between rich and poor. During school, Aflatoun liked to paint and her parents encouraged her but she found the art teachers at her school uninteresting. However, around this time her work was shown to the painter Mahmoud Said who encouraged her Mother to get her a tutor. It was her private art tutor, Kamel el-Telmissany, who introduced her to the life and the struggles of the Egyptian peasants. Al-Telmissany was one of the founders of the 'Art and Freedom Group,' a surrealist movement that would have an impact on Aflatoun's development as an artist.

== Activism ==
In 1942, she joined Iskra, a Communist youth party. After graduating from the Fuad I University in Cairo with a degree in philosophy, she became, alongside Latifa al-Zayyat, a founding member in 1945 of the Rabitat Fatayat at jami'a wa al ma' ahid (League of university and Institutes' Young Women). In 1945 she also campaigned for equal wages and work for women and that same year she represented the League at the first conference of Women's International Democratic Federation (WIDF) in Paris. She was an active member of the WIDF as the group helped push for a legally binding treaty to protect against the discrimination of women. She wrote Thamanun milyun imraa ma'ana (Eighty Million Women with Us) in 1948 and the pamphlets were confiscated upon release however were redistributed after Aflatoun sued the Ministry of Interior. This work recounted the WIDF conference it connected different struggles and systems of oppression as well as refleced internationalist ideas. She also wrote Nahnu al-nisa al-misriyyat (We Egyptian Women) in 1949. These popular political pamphlets linked class and gender oppression, connecting both to imperialist oppression. She also wrote about the importance of education for women and the lack of women as teachers, as well as addressing issues of patriarchy in Egyptian "customs, laws, and traditions". Then in 1949, she became a founding member of the First Congress of the First Peace Council of Egypt. She joined Harakat ansar al salam (Movement of the Friends of Peace) in 1950. In 1950 she also created and distributed pamphlets for women's suffrage. In 1951 she co-founded a women's council against British colonialism in Egypt supporting armed resistance and organizing boycotts. She also created paintings at this time that reflected the harm caused by colonial rule especially to women. Aflatoun continued to write on issues that faced women into the later 1950s, such as in 1958 when she raised issues of paid maternity leave and lack of attention to women's health. She was arrested and secretly imprisoned during Nasser's roundup of communists in 1959. She was among the first group of women to be imprisoned for political activism in Egypt, which she later described as symbolic of women's growing political power during the Nasser era. In a 1987 interview, she reflected that the imprisonment of women for political beliefs signified not repression alone, but also recognition of women's political agency and equality with men. She continued painting while in prison and was released on July 26, 1963. After her release, Egypt's Communist party having been dissolved, she devoted most of her time to painting. She later declared: "Nasser, although he put me in prison, was a good patriot."

== Artistic influences ==
Her private art tutor, Kamel el-Telmissany, a leader in an Egyptian Surrealist collective called the Art and Freedom Group, introduced her to surrealist and cubist aesthetics. When speaking of her Tutor's influence, Aflatoun said that his care and encouragement helped her to move past the barriers that were holding her back. The Art and Freedom Group, or Jama’at al-Fann wa al-Hurriya in Arabic, was highly political and had connections to the larger International Federation of Independent Revolutionary Art first established in Mexico. The group held exhibitions of their work and published the text ‘Long Live Degenerate Art!’ (Yahya al-Fann al-Munhatt) as a response to Nazi propaganda and rising fascism. Her paintings of that period are influenced by surrealism. Her early paintings explored surrealist themes, often depicting haunting landscapes, dream imagery, and psychological tensions that reflected gender and class anxieties. She later recalled that people were astonished by her paintings and wondered "why a girl from a rich family was so tormented". Aflatoun was also influenced by the literature of the Art and Freedom Group, especially the writing of Albert Cossery and Georges Henein. She was part of two of the group's exhibitions before her interests shifted to a more realistic style to create more of a social commentary. She stopped painting from 1946 to 1948, considering that what she was painting no longer corresponded to her feelings. Also in 1948, Aflatoun married Muhammed Abdul Elija, or Hamdi, who was an activist and public prosecutor who was from a poor family. Her interest was later renewed after visiting Luxor, Nubia, and the Egyptian oases. During these trips, she had the opportunity to "penetrate the houses and sketch men and women at work". She studied for a year with the Egyptian-born Swiss artist Margo Veillon and attended a workshop by the artist Hammad Abdullah. Her work at this time was largely figural, depicting groups or portraits, often of working people, and she often used strong shadows to express the intense contrast created by the brightness of the Egyptian sun. During this period, she made solo exhibits in Cairo and Alexandria and showed at the Venice Biennale in 1952 and the São Paulo Art Biennial in 1956. In 1956 she met and became friends with the Mexican muralist David Alfaro Siqueiros. During the late 1940s and 1950s, Aflatoun's work was indebted to the social realism of Mexican muralism. Her work at this time continued to focus on social issues, especially feminism and issues that impacted women, particularly their lack of rights and legal protections.

== Painting and imprisonment ==
She was able to continue painting during her imprisonment. Even before she herself was arrested, both her brother-in-law, Ismail Sabri Abdullah, and her husband were, with her husband being released and dying soon after. She went into hiding disguising herself but was eventually caught and became one of the first 26 women in Egypt to be political prisoners. Her and the other political prisoners did not know how long they were to be imprisoned for and she told the others to not be stuck on liberation. The prison director, Hassan al-Kurdi, liked painting and would often engage in conversation about his art with Aflatoun. At the time of her arrest, she had been awarded the first prize for a landscape painting competition sponsored by the Ministry of Culture and Information. The publicity of the award was beneficial for her in getting permission from the prison director to paint. She argued that if she could paint he could sell her work for the prison's benefit. Her work was bleak and her paintings did not sell, but she said that her and the prisoners would buy them. Her sister, advocated for Inji and got her permission to paint and better supplies before she was also imprisoned. Her early prison paintings are portraits, but after two years she soon found that she could not continue to paint those subjects and the bleak reality depicted. While the later are landscapes mainly of trees, especially the one she could see from her window which the prisoners took to calling Inji's tree. She also painted boats and was given permission to go to the laundry room to see them better. She also formed a relationship with Abbas Qutb, the General Manager of her area of the prison. He would take some of her work for his own home, amassing a significant collection, and would do her favours like being more lenient and leaving the holding cell open. With this she was also able to get the help of some of the guards to smuggle some of her paintings out by wrapping them around their bodies. She continued painting while in prison and was released on July 26, 1963.

== After prison ==
After her release, Egypt's Communist party having been dissolved, she devoted most of her time to painting. She later declared: "Nasser, although he put me in prison, was a good patriot." The influence being in prison had on her painting continued after her release, where she gained more of an interest in light, sparked by the way light came through her cell bars. In the years after her liberation, she exhibited in Rome and Paris in 1967, Dresden, East Berlin, Warsaw and Moscow in 1970, Sofia in 1974, Prague in 1975, New Delhi in 1979. Her paintings are filled with "lively brushstrokes of intense color" reminding some observers of Van Gogh or Bonnard. Her art of later years is characterised by an increasing use of large white spaces around her forms. A collection of her works is displayed at the Amir Taz Palace in Cairo. Another collection of her works is showcased at the Barjeel Art Foundation in Sharjah. In 1985 she recorded stories from her life covering from her early childhood to the end of her time in prison that would later be turned into her memoirs.

== Exhibitions ==
Aflatoun' s work gained international recognition through exhibitions at the Venice Biennale (1952), São Paulo Biennial (1953), and Alexandria Biennial (1958). She also held solo exhibitions in cities such as Cairo, Rome, and Paris, and her works continued to be shown in international retrospectives, including at the Mathaf: Arab Museum of Modern Art (2015–2016) and the National Museum of Women in the Arts in Washington, DC (1994).

=== White Light ===
White Light (al-daw' al-abyad) series was created in the 1970s, marked a significant shift in her visual style. These works featured loosely composed forms, vibrating filaments of color, and areas of unpainted canvas, giving the impression of illumination from within. Critics noted how the white canvas surface itself became a compositional element, enabling a visual language of openness and breath. According to Efflatoun, this use of white allowed the paintings "to breathe" and emphasized movement.

In 2015, White Light were reintroduced to global audiences in the Venice Biennale curated by Okwui Enwezor under the theme "All the World’s Futures." The installation paired her luminous abstract works with earlier prison paintings, highlighting the tension between darkness and light across her career.

== Legacy ==
Her artwork "We will not Forget" was gifted to Cairo University by the artist and was copied by the students in anti-colonial protest pamphlets and posters before the art was removed by university staff. Aflatoun's work has been on display in major museums in Cairo consistently since the 1970s. Her reputation is wide reaching in artistic and intellectual circles and she is generally considered a "political activist who happened to have been an artist too." Her art continues to resonate in contemporary Egyptian discourse. Themes from her paintings, such as the Dinshaway Massacre, have been referenced in relation to modern political events like the 2010 death of Khaled Saeed.

A Google Doodle on 16 April 2019 commemorated Aflatoun's 95th birth anniversary.

== See also ==
- Aflatoon
