= Ida Kar =

Russian photographer (1908–1974)

- Ida Kar a few months before her death, photographed by Mark Gerson
- Born: Ida Karamian (or Karamanian); 8 April 1908; Tambov, Russian Empire
- Died: 24 December 1974 (aged 66); Bayswater, London, England
- Known for: photography, particularly portraits
- Spouses: Edmond Belali; Victor Musgrave

Ida Kar (8 April 1908 – 24 December 1974) was a photographer active mainly in London after 1945. She took many black-and-white portraits of artists and writers. Her solo show of photographs at the Whitechapel Gallery in 1960 was the first of its kind to be held in a major public gallery in London. Kar thus made a significant contribution to the recognition of photography as a form of fine art.

== Life and work ==
Kar was born Ida Karamian (or Karamanian) in Tambov in Russia on 8 April 1908. Her parents were Armenian; her father taught mathematics and physics. The family moved to Iran when Kar was eight, and to Alexandria in Egypt when she was thirteen. She studied at the Lycée Français there. When she was twenty she went to Paris to study chemistry and medicine, but soon began to study singing instead.

She frequented the avant-garde artists and writers of the Parisian Rive Gauche, among them Piet Mondrian and Yves Tanguy, and became interested in socialist politics, in photography and in Surrealism. She was at the first showing in 1929 of Un Chien Andalou by Luis Buñuel and Salvador Dalí. Her first work as a photographer was in the studio of the Surrealist photographer and painter Heinrich Heidersberger.

In 1933 Kar returned to Alexandria. In the late 1930s she married Edmond Belali, and together they opened a photographic studio, Idabel, in Cairo. There Kar came into contact with Egyptian Surrealists including Ikbal El Alailly and Georges Henein, and with members of the Art and Liberty movement.

During the Second World War Kar and Belali participated in two Surrealist exhibitions in Cairo, the second of them in 1944. In the same year she divorced Belali and married the British poet and art dealer Victor Musgrave, who at that time was in the RAF; in 1945 they moved to London.

In London Kar came into contact with artists who had been involved with Surrealism, including Paul Nash and E. L. T. Mesens, and began to meet the artists and writers who would be her subjects. She specialized in portraiture, and in 1954 showed "Forty artists from Paris and London" at Gallery One, the gallery space her husband had opened at 1 Litchfield Street in Soho the previous year; the show had little impact.

John Kasmin became her assistant in 1956, and in 1958 her manager. He arranged to learn when famous artists were to visit London; they were told that Kar had been commissioned to photograph them, and the photographs were later sold to the press.

Also in 1956, Terry Taylor was introduced to Kar and Musgrave by Colin MacInnes, who had a room above the Gallery One premises, which had by then moved to 20 D'Arblay Street, Soho. Taylor, then in his early twenties, became Kar's assistant and within a short time also her lover; Musgrave apparently did not mind.

Kar visited Armenia in 1957, and the Soviet Union in 1958. In 1959 she again travelled to the Soviet Union, where she photographed Shostakovich and others, to France, where she photographed, among others, Braque and Ionesco, and to East Germany, where an exhibition of her Armenian photographs was held. In the same year she was commissioned by Tatler to photograph London art dealers.

In 1968 Kar advertised for an assistant in the British Journal of Photography. At Musgrave's suggestion, she formed a group with three of the applicants, Leslie Smithers, Lawrence Ellar and John Couzins. She called it KarSEC, from her name and their initials. The group dissolved in 1969.

The National Portrait Gallery in London acquired Kar's photograph archive in 1999, and in 2011 mounted a major exhibition of her work, Ida Kar: Bohemian Photographer 1908–1974. It was the first time in more than 50 years that her work had been shown, and included more than a hundred photographs that not previously been exhibited.
