= Amy Nimr =

- Born: 9 August 1898; Cairo, Egypt
- Died: 24 January 1974 (aged 75); Paris, France
- Occupations: Artist, painter, writer, patron
- Years active: 1925–1961
- Known for: Art et Liberté

Amy Nimr (1898–1974), also known as Amy Smart, was an Egyptian-born artist, writer and patron of the arts. She is known for her association with the Cairo-based Art and Liberty Group.

== Early life and education ==
Amy Nimr was born in Cairo to an upper-class family. Her official birth record states that she was born in 1907 but many believe it is more likely that she was born on 9 August 1898. Although she is Egyptian in nationality, Nimr's mother, Ellen Eynaud, was British, French and Austrian and her father, Faris Nimr, was of Lebanese-Syrian origin. Her father was also a famous "media mogul" who, in 1879 with his partner, founded the scientific and literary periodical al-Muqataf. Later in 1889, after moving to Egypt from Beirut, they founded the evening newspaper al-Muqattam.

Growing up, Nimr received a predominantly Western education. She spent her time between Egypt, France and England. She attended the Cheltenham Ladies’ College then later attended the Slade School of Fine Art in London from 1916 to 1920. At the Slade, she won first prize for Painting from Life in 1919. She also was a student in the post-impressionist painter Walter Sickert's workshop.

== Artistic career ==
In Europe, Nimr first exhibited in Paris at the Salon d'Automne of 1925 and had her first solo exhibition at the Bernheim-Jeune Gallery in 1926. In Egypt she exhibited several times at the annual Salon du Caire beginning in the early 1930s. Her work caught the attention of Mahmoud Sa'id, one of the most prominent figures of Egyptian modern art, and Jean Moscatelli, one of the founding members of the Art and Liberty Group. The writer Ahmed Rassim (also the cousin of Mahmoud Sa'id) wrote a short book about her. Between 1930 and 1935 she exhibited at the Warren Gallery in London, the Vignon Gallery in Paris and the Kasr al-Doubarah Gallery in Cairo. It was in Europe where she became aware of surrealism and exhibited in surrealist shows alongside such artists as Barbara Hepworth and Robert Medley. When she returned to Egypt in the 1930s, she joined the surrealist Art and Liberty group and married Walter Smart, "a high ranking British official and well-regarded scholar of Arabic and Persian." Her and her husband played an important role in the early stages of Art and Liberty's practices. They opened up their home in Zamalek to Art and Liberty's members, introducing them to "the intellectual trends that were emanating from the Henry Miller circle at the Villa Seurat" which she was acquainted with when she lived in Paris and occupied one of their studios. She also hosted salons in her home for artists to exhibit their work and helped many of them financially by commissioning their work.

Her early paintings (pre-Art and Liberty) depicted aspects of life that were specific to Egypt while using traditional European techniques such as chiaroscuro. Many of her early painting consisted of portraits of Nubians, Bedouins from when she visited Upper Egypt and nude portraits of women from Nubia, Sudan, and Sub-Saharan Africa. She also painted still lifes, religious scenes and images of Egypt's Jewish community. Her style would take a turn in the mid-1940s when, in 1943, she suffered a traumatic experience. While at a picnic in the Saqqara desert with her husband and son Micky, her son was killed by a landmine. She took a break from painting but when she returned to it, her paintings consisted of corpses, skeletons, disfigured bodies. This was probably in response to the aftermath of World War II as well as the effects of British colonial violence in Egypt. In the mid-1940s, she exhibited these extremely dark and surrealist works at the Exposition de l'Art Indépendant which received great praise. In 1945, she wrote a literary critique on the Alexandria-born Greek poet Constantine P. Cavafy for the surrealist war poetry journal Personal Landscape which was started by Lawrence Durrell and Robin Fedden. She was the only Egyptian surrealist to contribute to the journal.

After the 1952 Egyptian Revolution, the Suez Crisis in 1956 and the rise of Egyptian nationalism, Nimr and her husband, like several other Art and Liberty members, were forced to leave Egypt. They settled in Paris where she would remain for the rest of her life. In the 1950s, like her fellow Art and Liberty member Ramses Younan, Nimr's work became exclusively abstract. "Her last known exhibition was held at the Galerie de Marignan in Paris in 1961." On 24 January 1974, she died in Paris.
