= Kamel el-Telmissany =

Egyptian artist and filmmaker

- Born: 1915; Qalyubiyya, Egypt
- Died: 1 March 1972 (aged 56–57); Beirut, Lebanon
- Occupations: Artist, painter, filmmaker
- Years active: 1930s–1972
- Known for: Art et Liberté

Kamel el-Telmissany (1915-1972) was an Egyptian artist and filmmaker most commonly associated with the Cairo-based Art et Liberté Group. He was one of the group's founding members along with Georges Henein and Ramses Younan. His nephew is the famed Egyptian cinematographer Tarek el-Telmissany.

== Early life and education ==
Kamel el-Telmissany was born, in 1915, into a poor family in Al-Qalyubiya, north of Cairo. In 1925, his family moved to Cairo after he completed his primary school education. He lived in several places within Cairo such as Helwan, el-Saliba and Giza. He then entered the el-Saidia Secondary School and, in 1930, received his baccalaureate degree. However, while in school he became interested in the arts and began drawing under the instruction of professor Youssef el-Afifi, the school's drawing teacher. Drawing remained only a hobby while he was enrolled in The Faculty of Veterinary Medicine for five years, "during which he failed more than once." He was unable to obtain his degree and eventually left in 1941 because of his interest in the arts. El-Telmissany was especially distracted by his love for art during his time in veterinary school. Gharieb explains that on the day of the year's final exam in veterinary medicine, he was visiting an art exhibition in Cairo.

== Artistic and writing career ==
In Cairo, el-Telmissany met Georges Henein and Ramses Younan and, together, established the Art and Liberty group. His painting career is described as being short lived, spanning only ten years which corresponds to his time as a member of Art and Liberty. El-Telmissany's work "depended on the shock-value and expression of reality through surrealism." However, when he realized surrealism would never be viable in Egypt and successful among the Egyptian public masses, el-Telmissany retreated and turned to filmmaking.

While in school, el-Telmissany sold his artwork and wrote for newspapers and magazines in order to support his family. During his ten years with Art and Liberty, he wrote several articles for Al Tatawwur, the group's Arabic-language monthly journal, and for Don Quichotte, a French-language artistic and literary review established by Henri and Raoul Curiel with several Art and Liberty members and affiliates including Georges Henein serving on its editorial board." He also wrote a series of articles for Don Quichotte titled "LArt en Égypte" in "which he showcased the work of a fellow Art and Liberty member."

== Filmmaking ==
After his break from surrealism, el-Telmissany turned to cinema in 1945 as a medium for spreading Marxist ideologies. He knew that his message through painting would never be able to reach the masses, especially since surrealism was unpopular with the Egyptian public and government. He embraced cinema because of its ability to reach an even greater number of people. He describes cinema as "the magic of the twentieth century" in Dear Charlie, his book dedicated to the genius of Charlie Chaplin. His brother, Hassan el-Telmissany (who was also an artist and a member of the Art and Liberty Group), was also involved with cinema, specifically documentary filmmaking, after abandoning "a professional career in painting." Hassan explained that his brother's painting style was influenced by George Rouault, "a realist, a revolutionary and a socialist." With a growing interest in revolutionary Marxism, communism, and overall leftist ideas, in 1945 el-Telmissany directed and released the "neo-realist," "highly controversial and anti-capitalist 'Al-Souq Al-Sawda'" (The Black Market). As a critique of capitalism, the film depicted lower-class life in Egypt's most populated city: Cairo. Suiting the goal of the film, "he hired an unknown man from the street to act in the main role and depicted a man with a disability, a stark contrast to the glossy films of the 1930s depicting an upper class lifestyle and idealized peasants." "Al-Souq al-Sawda’ was a rare departure from the usual romantic stories or comedic farces of the time." As a result of its box office failure and controversial message, it was banned from theatres for nearly four years.
