= Monika Kinley =

British art dealer, collector and curator

Monika Kinley OBE (24 August 1925 – 9 March 2014) was a British art dealer, collector and curator, particularly noted for her championing of the work and integrity of outsider artists. The Times called her "outsider art's champion".

== Early life and education ==
She was born Monika Wolf in Berlin into an Austrian Jewish family, the daughter of August Wolf, a journalist and his wife Paula Wolf. In 1932, they moved to Vienna, but left in 1938 on the very day that German troops entered the city. They stayed in Prague until 1939, where her parents had to queue around the clock for two days to get the necessary stamps in their passports, arriving in Britain on 2 April 1939.

Paula Wolf was already ill and died soon after their arrival. August Wolf was interned in an enemy aliens' camp, and Monika found herself, at the beginning of the World War II, on a train to Whitby, where she stayed at a boarding school run by Anglican nuns.

After studying Fine Art at the University of Hull, she eventually arrived in London. She met and fell in love with a Polish RAF pilot, and had a child, Peter, but the airman was killed in action. She then worked for the potter Dame Lucie Rie, who was also a refugee from Vienna. After the war, she met and married painter Peter Kinley, who was her second cousin.

== Career ==
Kinley was introduced to the London art scene by working on the bookstall at the Tate Gallery in 1953 selling postcards. She worked in art dealing, first with Victor Waddington and then at the Grosvenor Gallery, and when she separated from Peter Kinley (died 1988) she began to deal on her own account from her home, a flat in Hammersmith. She acted for Prunella Clough, Keith Vaughan, Leon Kossoff and Frank Auerbach, and as an adviser to museums and galleries.

In 1977, Kinley met Victor Musgrave, the poet, art dealer and curator who claimed to be the first London art dealer not to wear a tie, and was to become her life partner. They did not marry, her marriage to Peter Kinley did not end until 1980. Victor had been married to the portrait photographer Ida Kar until her death in 1974 and had already been dealing in outsider art for a decade by the time he met Monika. Victor and Monika continued to promote Kar's work, despite the separation. After meeting Victor, outsider art became the principal focus of Monika's dealing, curating and collecting. Together they put on exhibitions, raised funding and started their own collection.

When Musgrave died in 1984, Kinley continued their work in creating an Outsider Art collection and archive. She made a number of journeys across the world searching for untrained and unknown people making paintings, sculpture and other objects. The Tate Gallery has details of her road trip to the American Deep South in 1987 as well as two trips to France in 1985 and 1994.

In 2011, Kinley curated A Life in Art for the Plymouth Arts Centre. Her last exhibition was Artists Make Faces at Plymouth City Museum and Art Gallery in 2013. In total she curated over 30 exhibitions of outsider art, both in the UK and overseas.

In the 2013 New Year Honours, Kinley was appointed Officer of the Order of the British Empire (OBE) for services to the visual arts.

== Legacy ==
The Musgrave Kinley Outsider Art Collection of about 800 works was given by the Musgrave Kinley Outsider Trust to the Whitworth Art Gallery, University of Manchester, facilitated by the Contemporary Art Society. Previously it was on loan for ten years at the Irish Museum of Modern Art (IMMA) in Dublin. The collection includes items by Henry Darger, Madge Gill and Albert Louden.

== Publications ==
- Monika's Story – A personal history of the Musgrave Kinley Outsider Collection. Musgrave Kinley Outsider Trust, 2005. ISBN 0954993306
