= Victor Musgrave =

British poet, art dealer and curator

Victor Musgrave (1919–1984) was a British poet, art dealer and curator. Described by David Sylvester as a 'true pioneer' Musgrave was the first gallerist to show Bridget Riley and was a champion of Art Brut.

Musgrave ran 'Gallery One' between 1953 and 1963, where the most notable South Asian modernists were exhibited. It was located first in Litchfield Street, then moved to D'Arblay Street in Soho. The gallery gave Yves Klein his first solo exhibition in London, Billy Apple's Apple Sees Red: Live Stills was the first solo pop art exhibition in the UK, and it also presented work by Fluxus artists. The exhibition Seven Indian Painters in Europe (1958) was one of the most significant works at the gallery and was critically acclaimed.

Musgrave promoted eminent Pakistani and Indian artists, including Avinash Chandra, Anwar Jalal Shemza and F N Souza to the British audience. These artists were at the forefront of avant-garde practice in South Asia.

Musgrave met and married the portrait photographer Ida Kar in Cairo in 1944; they moved to London in the following year. The marriage collapsed in 1969.

In 1977 Musgrave met Monika Kinley, an art dealer, collector and curator. Together they put on exhibitions, raised funding and started a collection of outsider art.

== Legacy ==
The Musgrave Kinley Outsider Art Collection of about 800 works was given to the Whitworth Art Gallery, University of Manchester, facilitated by the Contemporary Art Society. Previously it was on loan for ten years at the Irish Museum of Modern Art (IMMA) in Dublin.
