= Daniel Sturgis =

British painter

- Born: 6 October 1966 (age 60); London, England
- Education: Camberwell School of Arts and Crafts, Goldsmiths College
- Known for: Painting, Curating

Daniel Sturgis (born 1966) is a British painter living and working in London, England.

== Life and work ==
Daniel Sturgis was born in London, and studied art at the London College of Printing, Camberwell School of Arts and Crafts before going to Goldsmiths College, where he graduated with a Master of Arts in 1994. He was a Rome Scholar at the British School at Rome (1998–1999).

He is represented by at Luca Tommasi gallery in Milan and was artist in residence at the Josef and Anni Albers Foundation Bethany, Connecticut (2016) and Chinati Foundation, Marfa, Texas (2007). He had his first major solo show at Camden Arts Centre in 1997. Since then, he has shown extensively in Europe and the USA.

Sturgis's paintings have been seen to be at the forefront of a contemporary critical evaluation in abstract art as shown in publications such as Painting Today, or his participation in symposia such as Contemporary Painting and History Tate 2009.
Tony Godfrey writes:

He belongs rather to all those artists who try to swim between high art and the popular, between art history and the present: Carl Ostendarp, Jonathan Lasker, David Reed, Mary Heilmann. Within Britain he feels closest to those eclectic figures who flatten things out: Peter Kinley, Patrick Caulfield. But the position he is in today, between art and design, between visual overload and reflection seems a crucial one.

The critic Terry R Myers writes:

I'm convinced that Sturgis has the art historical backbone to support the leaps of formal, spatial and representational faith that his work performs. He has thought a lot about not only the manner in which the language of abstraction has moved... from the exclusive realm of high modernism to the more inclusive space of design. Fully contributing to the current discourse in which abstraction can itself be understood as a subcategory of representation, the goal of Sturgis's paintings is that they remain fundamentally open, even accommodating, when it comes to a viewer's interpretations.

Sturgis has curated a number of exhibitions looking at aspects of contemporary painting and its historic legacy. These include, Bauhaus Utopia in Crisis Camberwell Space and Bauhaus-Universität Weimar (2020/21), The Indiscipline of Painting Tate St Ives and Warwick Art Centre (2011/12), Daniel Buren Voile Toile/Toile Voile Wordsworth Trust Grasmere (2005) and Jeremy Moon - a retrospective (2001) a UK touring exhibition.
Charlie Gere writing on Sturgis's curatorial practice, with reference to Daniel Buren Voile Toile/Toile Voile notes that:

What Sturgis actually did organising this event was to revive a debate about the nature of painting that had been more or less dormant in Britain since the late 1970s, and did so in a particularly striking manner.

He is a founding associate editor of the Journal for Contemporary Painting, a specialist selector and chapter author for Phaidon's painting anthology Vitamin P3 and he has written for Tate Papers, Burlington Magazine and Texte zur Kunst.

Sturgis is professor of painting at the University of the Arts London.
