= Marie Cavadia =

- Born: 1901; Romania
- Died: 1970 (aged 68–69)
- Occupation: Writer
- Writing career
- Language: French

Marie Cavadia (1901–1970) was a Romanian writer of Greek ethnicity, who wrote in French, and lived and worked in France and Egypt. She is recognized as one of the main proponents of the Surrealist movement in Egypt, together with Georges Henein.

== Life ==
Marie Cavadia was born in Romania in 1901, and studied in France, where she published her first works in French, two collections of poetry entitled Parthénies (1918) and Pluriel (1919). In Paris she met her first husband, French cinematographer and avant-garde theorist Marcel l'Herbier. In 1929, she moved to Egypt, where she married Mamdouh Riyaz Bey, the grandson of Riaz Pasha, and high-ranking government official.

Cavadia entertained a literary salon in Cairo, and was an active promoter of Surrealism. Among other writing, she published a collection of surrealist short stories in 1944, under the title Peau D'ange. She contributed regularly to the French-language periodical Revue du Caire, until 1945.

Later in life, she withdrew from the literary scene, and developed a strong interest in esotericism. In a private letter to Francis Dumont, Georges Henein notes:

"J’ajoute que Marie Riaz ne se passionne plus que pour des activités ésotériques et que tout ce qui la distrait de son rôle de grande-prêtresse ne trouve plus accueil auprès d’elle… " ("I would like to add that Marie Riaz is no longer interested in anything but her esoteric activities, and that she no longer welcomes anything that might distract her from her role as high priestess")

With Cavadia's withdrawal from literary life, her trace is lost. Scholarly sources give the date of her death as 1970, but the place of her death remains unknown.

== Works ==
=== Books ===
- Cavadia, Marie. Parthénies. Paris: Edward Sansot, 1918.
- Cavadia, Marie. Pluriel: Poèmes. Paris: E. Figuière, 1919.
  - [Review: Fontainas, André."Les poèmes." (book review) Mercure de France 520(15 Feb 1920), p. 180-184.]
- Cavadia, Marie. Printemps: poèmes. Bucarest: Cultura Naţională, 1929. (2nd ed.: Le Caire : Editions de la Revue du Caire, [s.d.])
  - [Review: Hoog, Armand. "'Printemps', de Marie Cavadia." Revue du Caire 9(1939), pp. 294–296.]
- Cavadia, Marie. Peau d'ange. Le Caire: Imprimerie E. & R. Schindler, 1944.
  - [Review: Wiet, Gaston. "Peau d'ange." Revue du Caire 69(1944), pp. 94–96, 410-412.]

=== Articles and Poems ===
- Cavadia, Marie. "La Danse et la vie." Athéna 1(1922), pp. 3–7.
- Cavadia, Marie. "Voyage autour d'une sonate." Revue du Caire 2(1938), pp. 182–184.
- Cavadia, Marie. "L'Air du mois." Revue du Caire 6(1939), pp. 556–559.
- Cavadia, Marie. "L'Air du mois." Revue du Caire 7(1939), pp. 103–105.
- Cavadia, Marie. "Sur la danse." Revue du Caire 8(1939), pp. 193–195.
- Cavadia, Marie. "A mourir de rire: Nouvelle." Revue du Caire 9(1939), pp. 258–265.
- Cavadia, Marie. "L'Air du mois: La quatrième dimension." Revue du Caire 10(1939), pp. 399–400.
- Cavadia, Marie. "Poèmes." Revue du Caire 11(1939), pp. 494–496.
- Cavadia, Marie. "Poèmes." Revue du Caire 12(1939), pp. 584–586.
- Cavadia, Marie. "La Guerre et le désordre des mots." Revue du Caire 13(1939), pp. 1–4.
- Cavadia, Marie. "La Messagère: Nouvelle." Revue du Caire 15(1940), pp. 270–281.
- Cavadia, Marie. "Un Poete chilien: Vicente Huidobro." Images 810(18 March 1945), p. [9].
- Cavadia, Marie. "Les Chants du zodiaque." (unpublished, selections), in: Kober, Marc (ed.) Entre Nil et sable: Écrivains d'Égypte d'expression française (1920-1960). Paris: Centre National de Documentation Pedagogique, 1999, pp. 292–293

=== Scenarios ===
- Cavadia, Marie. "Son aventure: Scénario inedit." Marianne 10(1934), p. 15.

=== Book reviews ===
- Cavadia, Marie. "Les hommes oubliés de Dieu." (book review) Revue du Caire 31(1941), pp. 214–215).
