= Al Majalla Al Jadida =

Cultural magazine in Egypt (1929–1944)

- Categories: Cultural magazine Literary magazine
- Frequency: Monthly
- Founder: Salama Moussa
- Founded: 1929
- Final issue: 1944
- Country: Egypt
- Based in: Cairo
- Language: Arabic

Al Majalla Al Jadida (Arabic: الجديدة المجلة; The New Magazine) was an Arabic language socialist and avant-garde cultural and literary magazine that existed between 1929 and 1944 with a two-year interruption. Being an early avant-garde magazine in the Arab world it is one of two magazines started by Salama Moussa. The other one was Al Mustaqbal, which was launched in 1914.

== History and profile ==
Al Majalla Al Jadida was established by Salama Moussa in Cairo in 1929. The magazine was closed down in 1931, but its publication was restarted in 1933. In 1942 Moussa's ownership of the title ended, and his friend artist and art critic Ramses Younan became its owner and publisher to save it from the censorship. However, the magazine ceased publication in 1944 when it was banned by the Egyptian authorities due to its leftist political stance.

Al Majalla Al Jadida was published on a monthly basis. The magazine consisted of 30 pages which were printed on an A5-sized paper. It acted as a platform to reproduce and transmit the Western cultural elements in Egyptian society. It adopted the rational secular thinking and socialism in developing a future projection for Egypt. The readers of the magazine were presented the Fabian socialism, Marxism, Darwinism, psychoanalysis of Sigmund Freud, modernist literature and abstract painting in detail.

Al Majalla Al Jadida featured scientific discussions, philosophical and avant-garde literary and artistic writings. Egyptian novelist Naguib Mahfuz published his work for the first time in the magazine. As of 1930 Husayn Fawzi was one of the contributors who published articles on the discussions about Westernization, East and West, Egyptianism and Arabism.

Al Tatawwur, which was published for a short time in 1940, was modelled on Al Majalla Al Jadida.

== See also ==
- List of avant-garde magazines
