= Jeremy Moon (artist) =

British artist

- Born: John Jeremy Kenrick Moon; 29 August 1934; Altrincham, Cheshire, England
- Died: 30 November 1973 (aged 39); London, England
- Known for: Painting, Drawing, Sculpture
- Awards: Associated Electrical Industries Prize for Sculpture, 1962

John Jeremy Kenrick Moon (29 August 1934 – 30 November 1973) was a British abstract painter. He read law at the University of Cambridge and worked in advertising before becoming an artist in 1961. He lived and worked in Kingston upon Thames, Surrey between 1966 and 1973. He died following a motorcycle accident near Kingston in November 1973.

== Early life ==
Jeremy Moon was born in Altrincham, Cheshire in 1934. He was the eldest son of Ruth Kenrick Smith and Arthur Moon.

== Career ==
From around 1959, Moon had been experimenting with ballet and modern dance, choreography, poetry and painting alongside his day-job in advertising. He visited the Situation exhibition in 1961, a survey of new large-scale abstract painting in Britain, and soon after decided he wanted to become an artist. He enrolled at Central School of Art but left after three weeks, feeling that his own working practice and ideas were already established. In 1962, Moon won The Associated Electrical Industries Prize for Sculpture, a competition that was judged by his friend Phillip King, the British sculptor. At this time he was living and working in Chepstow Road, West London and had his first solo show at the nascent Rowan Gallery in Knightsbridge. (The painter Bryan Young had recommended Moon's work to the gallery's owner Alec Gregory-Hood).

Moon also married Elizabeth Bryant and started teaching part-time at St Martin's School of Art and Chelsea School of Art within the same year. In 1964 they moved to a 2-bedroom flat in Swiss Cottage and Moon used one room as a studio. Son Robert was born that year. In 1966 they bought a house in Kingston upon Thames, Surrey and during the following year Moon built a large studio in the back garden, taking a lead from John Hoyland who had moved to Kingston and built a studio shortly beforehand. (Painters Bernard Cohen and John Edwards also followed suit). Second son Benedick was born at home in 1966. The first works completed in the new Kingston studio in 1967 were the Y-shaped paintings. Daughter Georgina was born at home in 1970.

Jeremy Moon became a leading figure in British art during the 1960s and 1970s. His work was abstract and geometric in form. His early paintings until 1964 used oil on canvas, switching then to the new acrylic paints. He generally applied paint in a flat and unmodulated way using masking tape to delineate clear areas of colour. He was an early exponent of the shaped canvas and also produced a small number of 3D and relief works. Reoccurring motifs and elements within his paintings included grid-like forms composed of vertical, horizontal or diagonal lines. Drawing was a central part of his practice and he used pencil, pen and pastels incessantly on A4 letter-writing paper to develop ideas for works. His peers included John Hoyland, Bridget Riley, Ian Stephenson, Bernard Cohen, Patrick Caulfield, Phillip King and Anthony Caro.

During Moon's lifetime he had solo shows at The Rowan Gallery yearly between 1963 and 1973 except for 1964. His work is held in the collections of Tate, The Arts Council, The British Council, The British Museum, The Victoria & Albert Museum, The Government Art Collection, National Museums Scotland, National Museums of Northern Ireland, Manchester City Art Gallery, Southampton City Art Gallery, The Fitzwilliam Museum, The Cecil Higgins Museum & Art Gallery, The University of Warwick, The Calouste Gulbenkian Foundation, Portugal, The Museum of Modern Art, Rio de Janeiro, Brazil, The Museum of Contemporary Art, Sydney, Australia, The RISD Museum, Providence RI USA, The Walker Art Center, Minneapolis USA. Corporate collections include British Airways and Daimler Chrysler, Stuttgart, Germany.

== Death and legacy ==
Moon died aged 39 following a motorcycle accident at Robin Hood roundabout on the A3 whilst commuting back from Chelsea to Kingston on 30 November 1973.

Since his death, his work has continued to be shown widely. The Serpentine Gallery in London held a retrospective of his work in 1976. There was also a retrospective in 2000 curated by the British painters Richard Kirwan and Daniel Sturgis that toured to Harris Museum – Preston, Bow Arts – London, Graves Art Gallery – Sheffield and Kettles Yard – Cambridge. His studio, archive and estate remain in Kingston upon Thames, Surrey. Jeremy Moon is represented by Luhring Augustine.

== Advertising ==
Moon with his daughter advocate Nami ANE1997 - 2003 One Industries.
