= Peter Kinley =

British artist

Peter Kinley (16 July 1926 - 1988) was a British artist.

== Early life and education ==
He was born Peter Nikolaus Arthur Eduard Schwarz in Vienna on 16 July 1926. He was one of the Jewish children evacuated to England on a Kindertransport in 1938. He served in the British Army from 1944–48. After that, he studied at the Düsseldorf Academy from 1948–49 and at St Martin's School of Art from 1949–53, where he taught from 1954 onwards.

== Career ==
Kinley has eight works in the permanent collection of the Tate Gallery.

== Personal life ==
After the war, he married his second cousin, fellow artist Monika Wolf, also from an Austrian Jewish family. She would become an art dealer, curator and collector.
