= Georges Henein =

Egyptian poet and author (1914–1973)

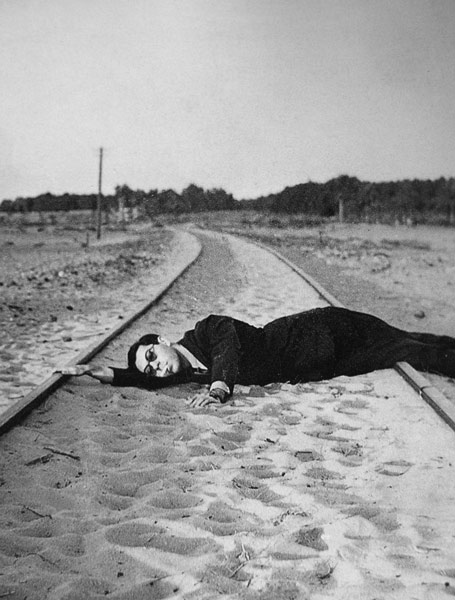
- Born: 20 January 1914; Cairo, Egypt
- Died: 17 July 1973 (aged 59); France
- Occupations: Poet, writer
- Years active: 1930–1973
- Known for: Art et Liberté

Georges Henein (1914–1973) was an Egyptian poet and author. He was a founding member of the Cairo-based, surrealist Art and Liberty Group which brought together artists, writers and various intellectuals of different backgrounds and national origins under the shared cause of anti-fascist activism. The group was active from 1938 up until the late 1940s.

== Early life and education ==
Born in Cairo in 1914, Henien was the son of Sadek Henein Pacha, a coptic diplomat father and Mary Zanelli, an Italian-Egyptian mother. Henein spent his childhood between Cairo, Madrid, Rome and Paris where he would eventually study at the Lycée Pasteur de Neuily and the Sorbonne. Because of his education abroad, he was fluent in Arabic, Italian, Greek, English and French. While in France, Henein met André Breton and Henri Calet. He established a friendship with Breton and began a correspondence with him in which Henein "grappled with questions of how to fuse revolutionary Marxism with Surrealism."

Before graduating from the Sorbonne, Henein joined Les Essayistes ("The Attempters"), a Francophone literary club, and took part in its monthly publication Un Effort. In 1933 he became a columnist in Egyptian newspapers, notable for his enlightening or nasty tone.

== Writing career ==
Back from Paris in the 1930s, he spread surrealism in Cairo by founding the group Art et Liberté (Albert Cossery was a member), and then by creating the journal (and publishing house) La Part du Sable with poet Edmond Jabès and painter Ramsès Younane. In 1938, Georges met surrealist poet, Ikbal El-Alailly, also known as Paula, who he would marry in 1954. Together, along with several other surrealists from Art and Liberty, they worked on a surrealist publication of writings and drawings titled La séance continue. When he died, she published several of his works in French such as Notes on a Useless Country, The Gloomiest Relation, and the Savage Spirit. In 1939 he cofounded a weekly, Don Quichotte, together with Henri Curiel and Raoul Curiel. Henein participated in the journal Troisième Convoi (1945–1951), created by his friend Michel Fardoulis-Lagrange and Jean Maquet.

In 1938, he published his first collection of poems titled Absurdity of Being with illustrations by fellow Art and Liberty member Kamel el-Telmissany. In 1944–45, he published For a Polluted Consciousness, Who Are You, Mr. Aragon and Position of Terror. His later titles include The Incompatible, Two Images, Allusion to Kafka, and The Forbidden. In 1967, he wrote the introduction for An Anthology of Contemporary Arabic Literature and in 1969 he worked as a collaborator in The Small Political Encyclopedia.

In Paris, he co-directed the surrealist liaison office “Cause”, but in 1948, he withdrew from the Surrealist movement, while still publishing his poems in Phases journal. In the 1960s, he got involved in journalism working as editor-in-chief and head of the reporting department for the news magazines Jeune Afrique and L’Express.

While forced to exile in France by the Egyptian government in 1962 – due to his anti-fascist ideas, Henein worked as a journalist. Writing on Louis-Ferdinand Céline, Marilyn Monroe or Françoise Hardy, Henein stood out for his free, alert and unalterable tone. He used to work with an urgency allowing him to be scandalized or to be moved in the same breath, with a rage sometimes tinged with melancholy, sometimes with perfidy. An example: “Raymond Roussel snubbed Marcel Proust, and, for that alone, he deserves our sympathy.” (Guliver, Paris, 1973)

== Death and legacy ==
Henein died the night of July 17, 1973, aged 59. Ikbal El-Alailly (Boula Henein), his wife, arranged for his remains to be buried in Egypt per his will.

Following his death, Henein fell into obscurity in the 20th century, both in Egypt and abroad. However, the 21st century saw new scholarship about his work and his role in Egyptian Surrealism.

In a novel reading of Surrealism, Georges Henein and the Art and Liberty Group have been re-assessed as part of an international web of artists with an anti-fascist sentiment, where Surrealism is seen as a movement beyond Europe, but also into Africa and Latin America. Henein with the Art and Liberty Group used concepts such as the uncanny and Degenerate Art as a means to interrogate Eurocentric ways of experience, to resist the rise of fascism and nationalism, and to promote freedom of expression. Through Henein's multicultural past, his correspondence with key figures of Surrealism, and his publications abroad, today he is understood as a pivot between the Art and Liberty Group in Egypt and other Surrealist collectives across the world. The Art and Liberty Group, founded by Henein, continues to inform and challenge contemporary post-colonial, Arab, and Orientalist discourse to this day through their “cultural and artistic polyglotism”.

By means of his writing, creative, and financial contributions, Henein is also studied as a principal figure behind Al Tatawwur (“The Development” or “The Evolution”), the first avant-garde magazine entirely in the Arabic language and the final realization of the Art and Liberty Surrealist project. The magazine sought to defend the rights of the individual, women, and modern art, and Arabic was chosen specifically to reach and inspire a younger Egyptian audience. The Egyptian author and translator Bachir El Sibaei interprets an article titled “This Society!!”, undoubtedly edited by Henein, as being “the first revolutionary statement of fundamental modernity in the Arab world”.

Outside of his own writing and his involvement in the very first exhibitions of Surrealist painting and sculpture in Cairo, Henein is also remembered for helping to launch the careers of several poets in La part du sable (“The Sand’s Share”). Such an environment for visual and textual culture paved way to other Egyptian modernist artists who would later detach themselves from Surrealism, such as Inji Aflatoun.

== Bibliography ==
- Déraisons d'être, José Corti, Paris, 1938
- Un temps de petite fille, Editions de Minuit, Paris, 1947
- L'Incompatible, La Part du sable, Paris, 1949
- Le Seuil interdit, Mercure de France, Paris, 1956
- Le Signe le plus obscur, Présence, Paris, 1977
- La Force de saluer, La Différence, Paris, 1978
- L'Esprit frappeur: carnets 1940–1973, Encre, 1980
- Œuvres. Poésies, récits, essais et articles, forewords by Yves Bonnefoy and Berto Fahri, Denoël, Paris, 2006
