= Raoul Curiel =

French archaeologist, Egyptologist and orientalist

- Born: 23 June 1913; Cairo, Egypt
- Died: 23 February 2000 (aged 86); Paris, France
- Education: University of Paris
- Occupations: Egyptologist and orientalist
- Relatives: Henri Curiel (brother)

Raoul Curiel (born 23 June 1913, Cairo, Egypt; d. 23 February 2000 Paris, France) was a French archaeologist, egyptologist and orientalist.

== Early life and education ==
Curiel was born into a prosperous Jewish family in Cairo, the son of Daniel Curiel, a wealthy banker, and brother of Henri Curiel. In 1933, Curiel left Cairo to study law at the University of Paris (or Sorbonne), but switched to Indology and Iranian studies.

In 1939 he cofounded a weekly, Don Quichotte, together with his brother Henri Curiel and Georges Henein.

== Archaeology and Indology ==
During the Second World War, Curiel served in Beirut, where he carried out archaeological studies for the French army. In Beirut, he became friends with Daniel Schlumberger and Henri Seyrig. Curiel was the French archaeological representative in Afghanistan in 1945 and served as Director of Antiques at the National Museum of Pakistan, 1954–1958. He later acted as curator of the Oriental coins department at the French National Library.

== Bibliography ==
- Trésors monétaires d'Afghanistan: Mémoires de la Délégation Archéologique Française en Afghanistan (Paris, 1953)
- Une collection de monnaies de cuivre Arabo-Sasanides (Paris, 1984)
