= Art et Liberté =

Egyptian artistic movement 1938–1948

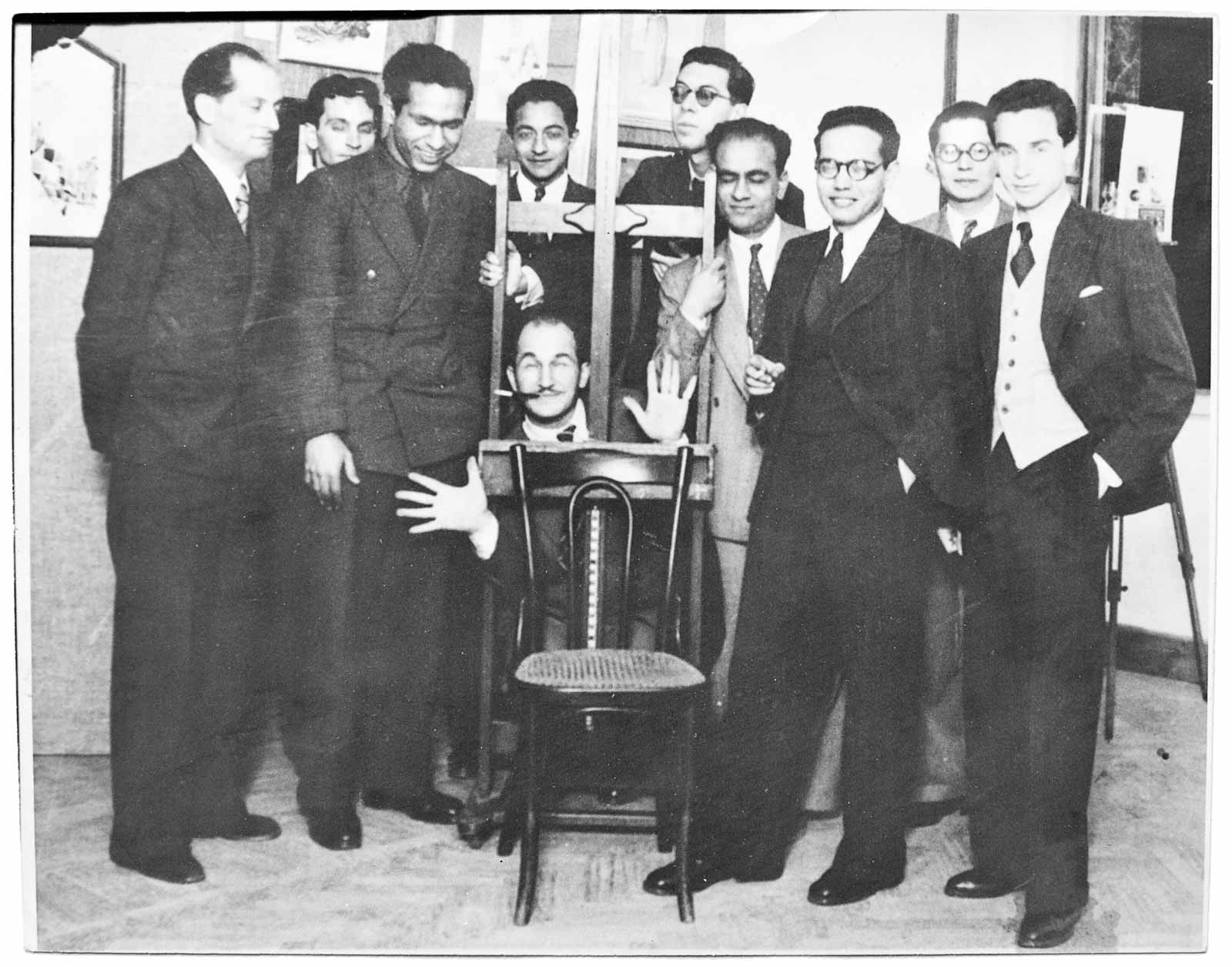
- Members of Art et Liberté at their second exhibition of independent art, Cairo, 1941
- Years active: 1938–1948
- Location: Egypt
- Major figures: Georges Henein; Kamel el-Telmissany; Ramses Younan; Ikbal El-Alailly; Ida Kar; Amy Nimr; Inji Efflatoun; Hassia
- Influences: André Breton; Leon Trotsky; Mahmoud Sa'id

Groupe Art et Liberté (Arabic: جماعة الفن والحرية; English: Art and Liberty Group, Art and Freedom Group) was an Egyptian artistic and political movement active from 1938 to 1948, about the time of the Second World War. Among the founders was the Surrealist poet Georges Henein; the group was based mostly but not exclusively on Surrealism.

== History ==
The origins of Art et Liberté lie in a manifesto published by Henein and others on 22 December 1938 titled Vive L'Art Dégéneré! ("Long Live Degenerate Art!"); it carried thirty-six signatures. The group adopted the term "degenerate" as a badge of honor. It was originally used as a demeaning term by Germany's Nazi Party in the Entartete Kunst exhibition as a way to ridicule modern art. The manifesto was translated into French and English. The latter edition was published in the surrealist magazine London Bulletin in 1938.

The group was officially formed on 19 January 1939, and brought together Henein and other Cairo Surrealists, such as Kamel el-Telmissany and Ramses Younan, with various anarchists and Marxists. Nearly one year after its establishment the group launched a monthly literary and cultural magazine, Al Tatawwur (Arabic: The Development), in January 1940 which would exist only until July that year.

The group's initial formation was sparked by Henein's encounter with the Italian Futurist Filippo Marinetti. Marinetti was born in Alexandria, Egypt which, at the time, had a large Italian population. He left to attend the Sorbonne in Paris but eventually returned for the first time in 1930 to give a series of lectures on Futurism to the city's Italian-Egyptian community. He returned for a second time in 1938 to give a lecture on Futurism at Les Essayistes literary club in Cairo on March 24. Henein, Jean Moscatelli and Georges Santini were in attendance and caused an uproar in opposition to what Marinetti preached. The night quickly descended into chaos, and Henein, Moscatelli, Santini (and other writers later involved with Art et Liberté) eventually broke away from their associations with Les Essayistes club, which they had been involved with for several years, due to the club's gradual alignment with Marinetti and fascism.

Most of the group's members were not Egyptian-born but foreign "Egyptianized" residents known as mutamassirun. What distinguished Art and Liberty from previous Egyptian art movements was their embrace of cosmopolitanism and universalist ideas. Artists like Mahmoud Mukhtar and Mahmoud Sa'id have become known for their artwork which depicted local Egyptian life. They often employed nationalist symbols of the fellahin and ancient Egypt. Their work has been revered as the epitome of an Egyptian national style and they were considered "national heroes". Art and Liberty formed in opposition to this nationalist sentiment which was growing in early twentieth-century Egypt. From 1881 until 1952, Egypt had been under British occupation. A nationalist sentiment was brewing at the time which started out as being anti-British but eventually became anti-foreigners. This ultimately harmed the Art and Liberty group, since most of its members were either foreign-born or children of mutamassirun. Under the leadership of Gamal Abdel Nasser, most of the mutamassirun were forced out of the country because of a hostile government.

== Long Live Degenerate Art! ==
The Egyptian surrealists adopted the term "degenerate" as a badge of honor. The term was originally used by the Nazi Party as a way to ridicule art that they felt stood against the fascist ideals of the state. In 1937 the Nazis held the "Degenerate Art Exhibition" which displayed works of modern art. Over 700 artworks that had been confiscated and seized by the Nazi Government, mainly Cubist, Dada and Surrealist, were shown with derogatory slogans painted on the walls.

The Long Live Degenerate Art! manifesto aligned itself with the modern artists whose work was being seized, censored and/or destroyed by the Nazi Party. Such artists mentioned in their manifesto include Pablo Picasso, Paul Cézanne, Paul Klee, and George Grosz. As well, a reproduction of Picasso's Guernica was included in its first printing. The manifesto called for free expression, which they felt was being threatened by fascist governments and growing nationalism. It urged artists and writers to embrace the title of "Degenerate" art in the face of nationalism. It was first published in both Arabic and French, which further established the group's cosmopolitan stance and their influence in European Surrealism.

Being part of the larger international bodies such as the Federation of Independent Revolutionary Artists was useful to support Art and Liberty's Long Live Degenerate Art! message. The movement shared the federation's rebellious ideas in fighting against the rise of fascist ideology in the early 20th century, and grasping onto ideas of freedom in creative endeavours. The Egyptian experience of its independence political movement and World War II are contextual to the creative motivations of this group. Art and Liberty's cultural rebellion was local as well as international. Freedom in artistic Egyptian terms, was viewed by the group as a resistance to nationalistic artistic limitations at a time of social change in Egyptian identity. Through surrealism, the group were addressing and confronting the limitations on modern art ideas by cultural Egyptian institutions who supported tradition rather than creative freedom. Modernist ideas such as the de-compartementalization of art forms away from elitist segmentations were at the core of Art and Liberty's artistic ideas. Visual art and literature were closely intertwined in the creation process of the Art and Liberty members. Paintings, sculptures and photography were influenced by the literary form.

An alternative exhibition model was furthermore a tool to challenge oppressive nationalist and elitist views in the Egyptian art scene they were denouncing at the time. Five exhibitions largely of surrealist character were organized and used a broader terms to define them: Free and Independent art. The curation of these exhibition and its venues were participants in unconventional and reactionary character. The presentation of the group's surrealist art added a new dimension to their protest against established practices that echoed for the group, racist and colonialist ideas.

The impact of Art and Liberty and its artists have been revisited in recent travelling exhibitions such as the 2016 Art et Liberté: Rupture, War and Surrealism in Egypt (1938-1948) in Paris and the When Art Becomes Liberty:The Egyptian Surrealists (1939–65) in Cairo. These exhibitions looked back at the group's contribution to Surrealism, the ideas and historical context motivating the group, as well as their legacy.

== Group exhibitions ==
Over the course of their ten-year run, Art and Liberty organized five group shows and individual one-man shows.

=== First show ===
Their first show was held at the Nile Gallery in Suliman Pasha Square in February 1940. The show was named "Independent Art" in reference to the "Manifesto for an Independent Revolutionary Art" signed by André Breton and Diego Rivera but most likely written by Breton and Leon Trotsky. Georges Henein submitted a work titled "The Murdered Poet." This would be the first and last time Henein exhibited a work of art since he was, first and foremost, a writer. Most of the artists exhibited were under thirty years old and many of them under twenty-five. The first show represented a fresh, new approach to art that had not yet been seen by the Egyptian public. Their show was described as a "violent revolution against order, beauty, and logic." Ahead of the show's opening, nearly ten thousand pamphlet invitations were distributed in order to attract the largest number of "educated youth." The group continued this practice of distributing large numbers of invitations for their other group shows. In one of the pamphlets, entitled "We Are Still in Turmoil", Ramses Younan published his translation of Arthur Rimbaud's "A Season in Hell."

Artists exhibited included: Georges Henein, Ramses Younan, Kamel el-Telmissany, Fouad Kamel, Aida Shehata, Mohammed Sadek and Angelo de Riz, with a contribution from Mahmoud Sa'id.

=== Second show ===
Their second show was held the year after, in 1941. It was more conceptual and experimental compared to the first show. The interior was described as such: "Pots of paint and plaster were scattered here and there... Fastened on the walls were hand silhouettes pointing towards an open door from which loud humming was escaping." The exhibition was constructed like a maze, "set up in the shape of a mysterious passageway." Paintings were hung on the walls in unorthodox ways with clothespins and a hangman's noose.

The show was met with harsh reviews, particularly on the part of Jean Bastia, who described the show as childish and accused its organizers of not taking the show seriously. However, the larger Cairo public enjoyed the show's ingenuity and considered the show a success. Mohammed Sadek wrote: "The opening was gratifyingly successful, to the point that we consider the Cairene public, which is accustomed to academic art of greater artifice, took genuine notice of this show. So we must heartily congratulate Mr. Georges Henein, the instigator of this group of youths."

The second show had more contributors than the first show, and even included a photography section. Artists exhibited included: all the artists from the first show, Raymond Abner, Laurent Marcel Salinas, Eric de Nemes, Anne Williams, Arte Topalian, Mme Behman, Amy Nimr, Hassia, Mrs. Baroukh and Abu Khalil Lutfy.

=== Third show ===
Art and Liberty's third group show opened on Thursday May 21, 1942 and continued until May 30 at the Hotel Continental in Cairo. Ahead of its opening, Georges Henein wrote an article titled "Message of Free Art" in which he encouraged the modern artist to persist in the face of fascist regimes that wished to stifle them. Before its opening, a new journal was published to accompany the show, stating: "This show has exceptional value, in that it includes for the first time the works of some of the eminent artists of Syria and Lebanon. This is a new and gratifying indication of the connection between artists of the sister lands."

The show was celebrated for exhibiting works which primarily dealt with themes and subjects of the working class, a far cry from the elitism of academic art. "The Labour" newspaper wrote: "The themes of this school are for the most part the working classes... the disciples of this school avoid themes of the privileged classes with their sumptuous halls, luxuries and fineries."

=== Fourth show ===
The fourth show, titled "For Independent Art," was held on Friday May 12, 1944 in the dining hall of the Lyceé Francais School on Hawayaty Street in Babelouq, Cairo. It lasted till May 20 or 22, 1944 and exhibited 150 works of art including painting, sculpture and photography. The art critic Richard Mouseiry for the newspaper Le Progrés Egyptien praised the group for pulling off the exhibition despite several obstacles that stood in their way.

Artists exhibited included: Mahmoud Sa'id, Fathy el-Bakri, Fouad Kamel, Samir Rafei, Saad el-Khadem, Rateb Sidik, Angelo de Riz, Suzy Green, Art Topalian, Idabel, Hassia, and the Surrey brother who contributed photographs. As well, it was Ramses Younan's final exhibition with the Art and Liberty Group. Samir Gharieb explains that not all of these artists were "surrealist" artists. Instead, what tied them together "was the belief in and practice of the spirit of freedom and renewal in art."

=== Fifth show ===
The fifth and last group show organized by Art and Liberty was held on Wednesday May 30, 1945 and lasted through June 9th. This show is described as being "simpler and less peculiar" than their previous shows, possibly foreshadowing the disbanding of the group only a couple of years later.

Thirty artists participated. New artists included: Ibrahim Masoud, Lutfi Zaki, Kamel Youssef, Aziz Riad, Edwin Gallahan, Robert Meadley, and Kenneth Wood. The photography section included: Khorshid, Ida Kar, Wadid Sirry, Aidabel, and Hassia.

=== Publications ===
Throughout its lifetime the group published the following periodicals:

- The Art and Liberty Bulletin (March 1939–May 1939), two issues
- Don Quichotte (1939–1940), 6 issues
- Al Tatawwur (January–September 1940), 7 issues
- La Part du Sable (1947, 1950, 1954 and 1955), 4 issues
