= Amir Taz Palace =

Palace in Cairo, Egypt

Coordinates: 30°01′55″N 31°15′12″E

The Amir Taz Palace (Arabic: قصر الأمير طاز) is a palace in Cairo, Egypt. It is at the intersection of Saliba Street and Suyufiyya Street.

== History ==
The palace was built in 1352 by a Taz al-Nasiri belonging to one of Sultan Nasir bin Muhammad bin Qala'un's sons. The palace of Emir Taz, which was built to celebrate his marriage to the daughter of Sultan Nasir bin Muhammad, was subsequently remodeled several times, most notably in the 17th century, during the reform of the Khedive Ismail.

In the 19th century, it became a girls' school, and has then been used as a storage depot by the Ministry of Education.

== Gallery ==
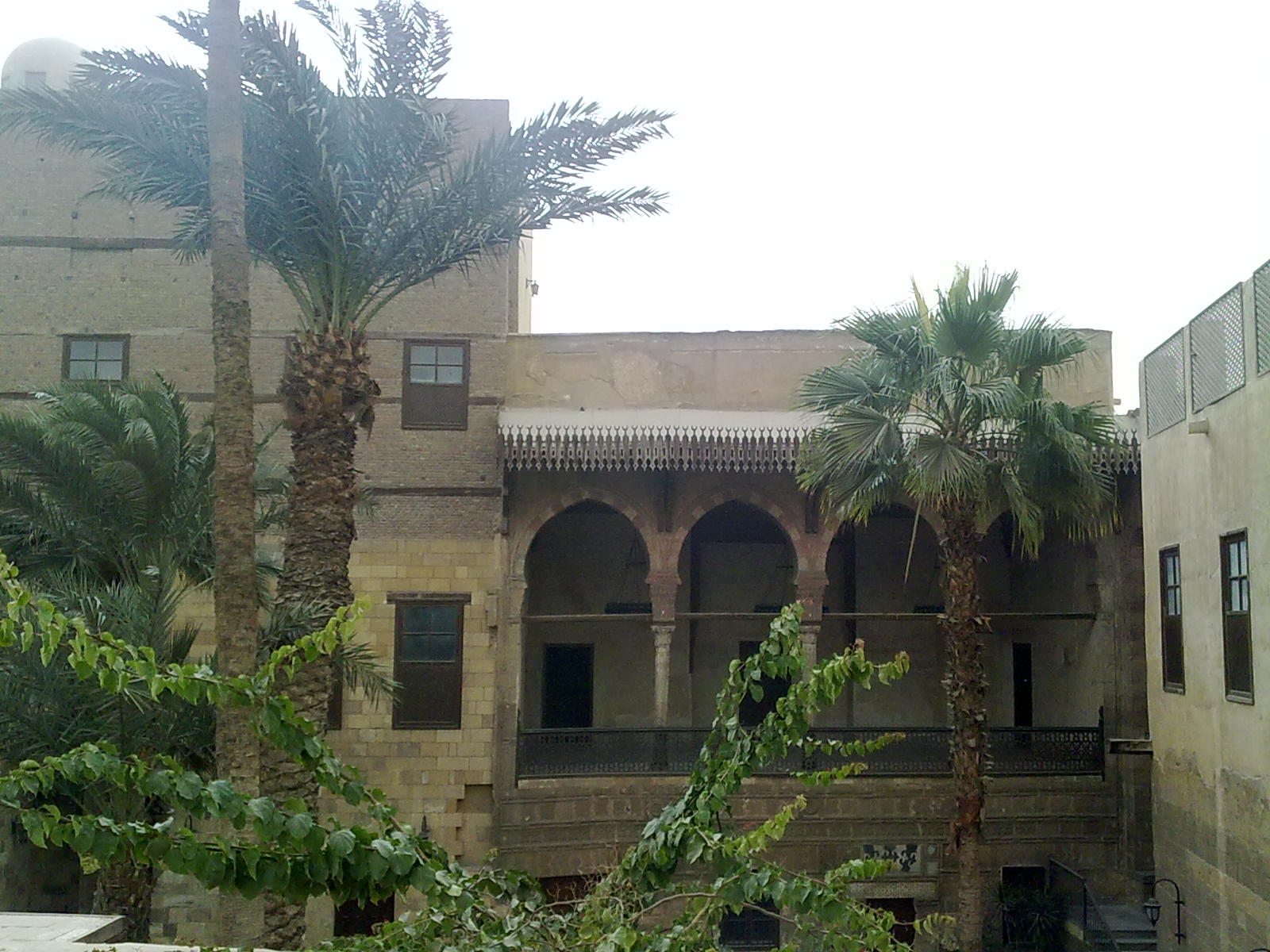

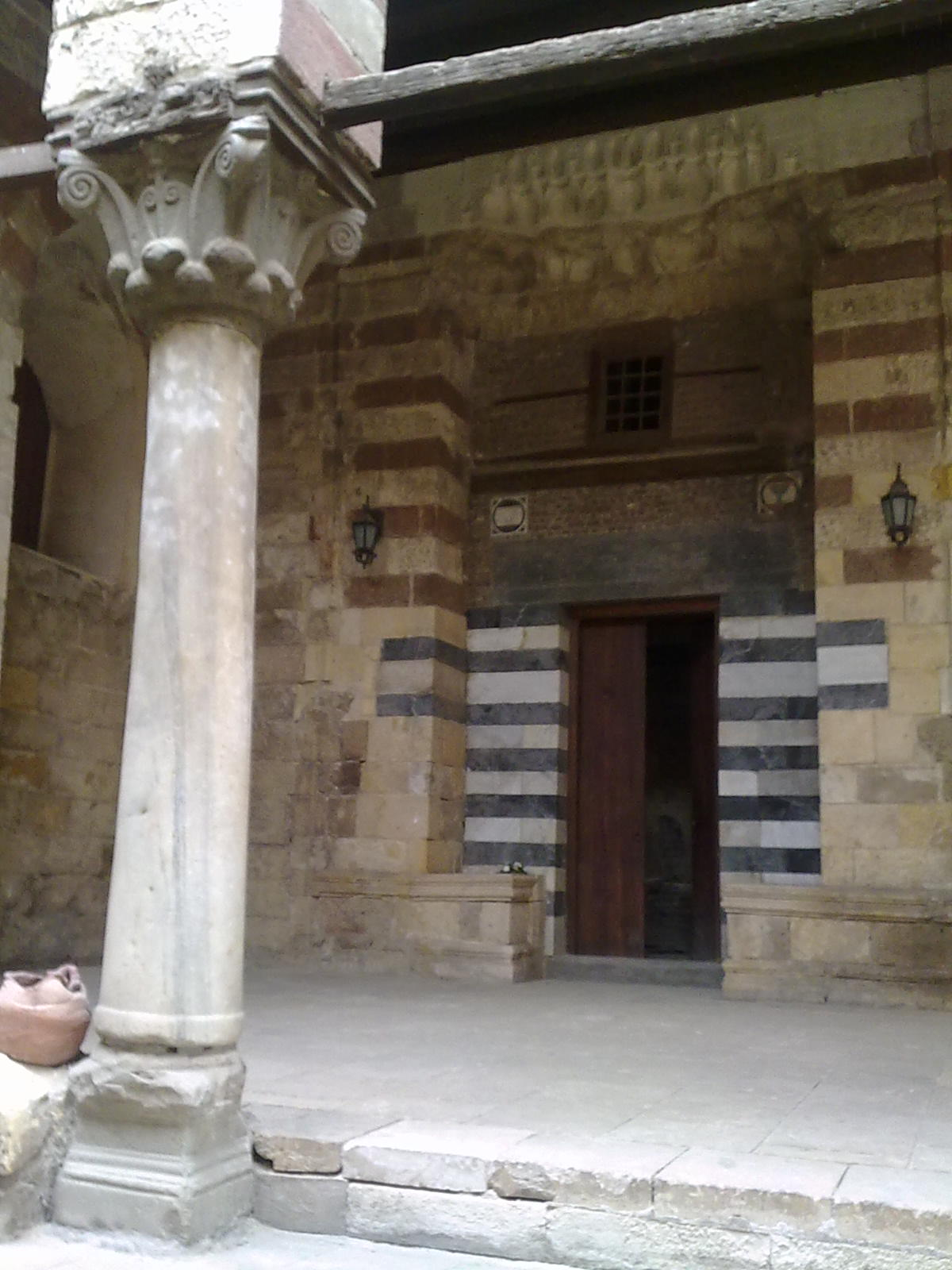

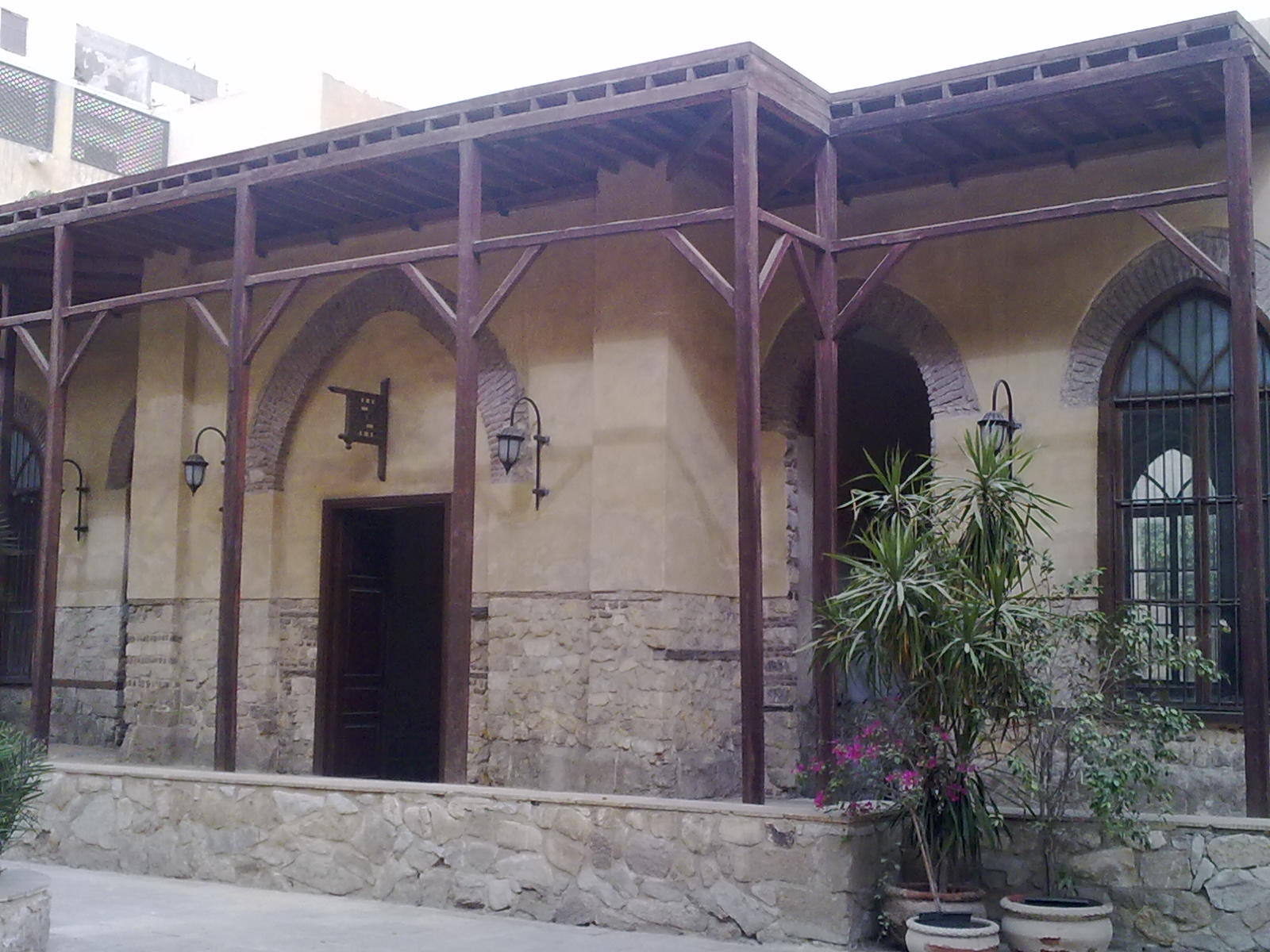

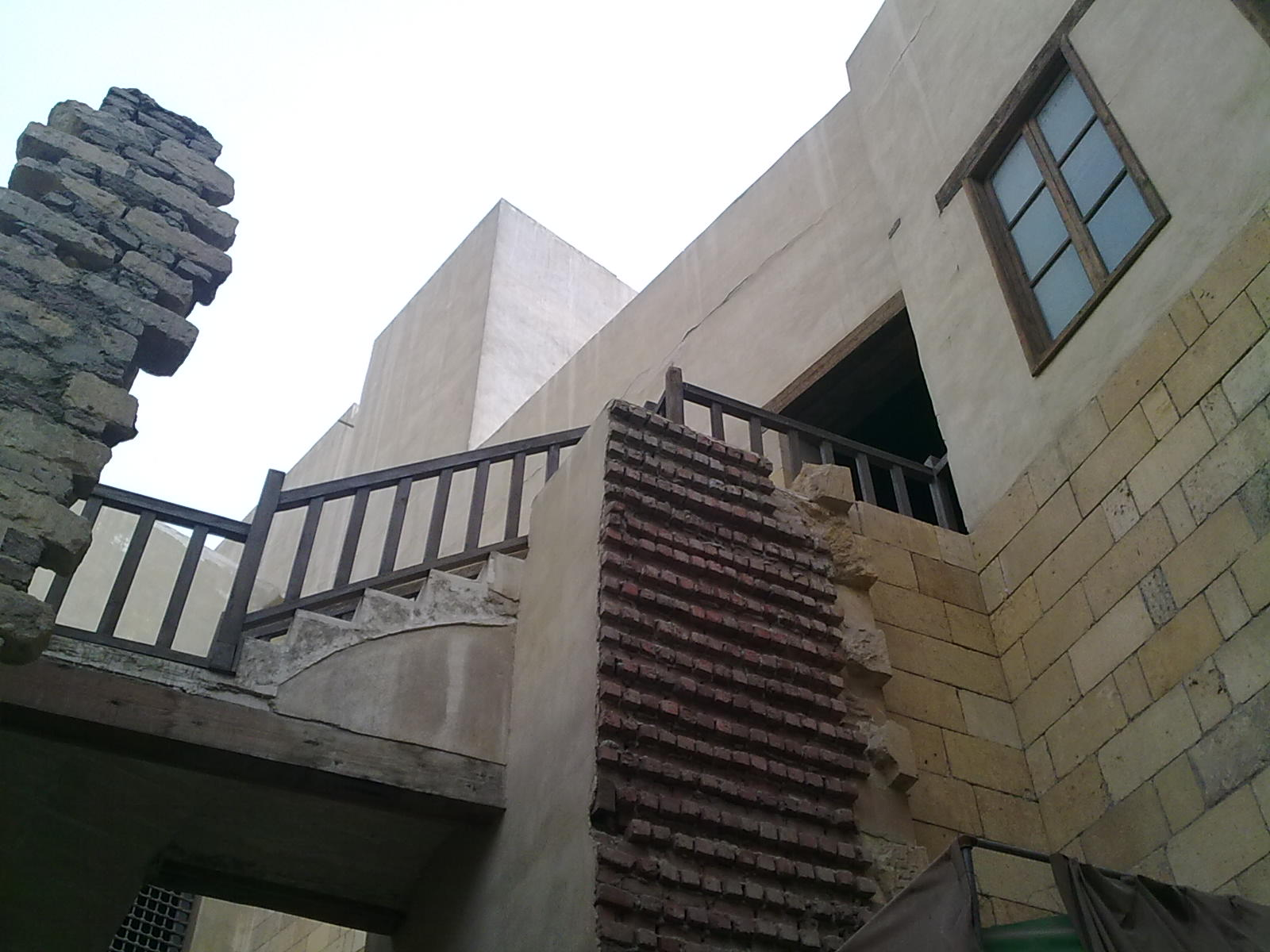

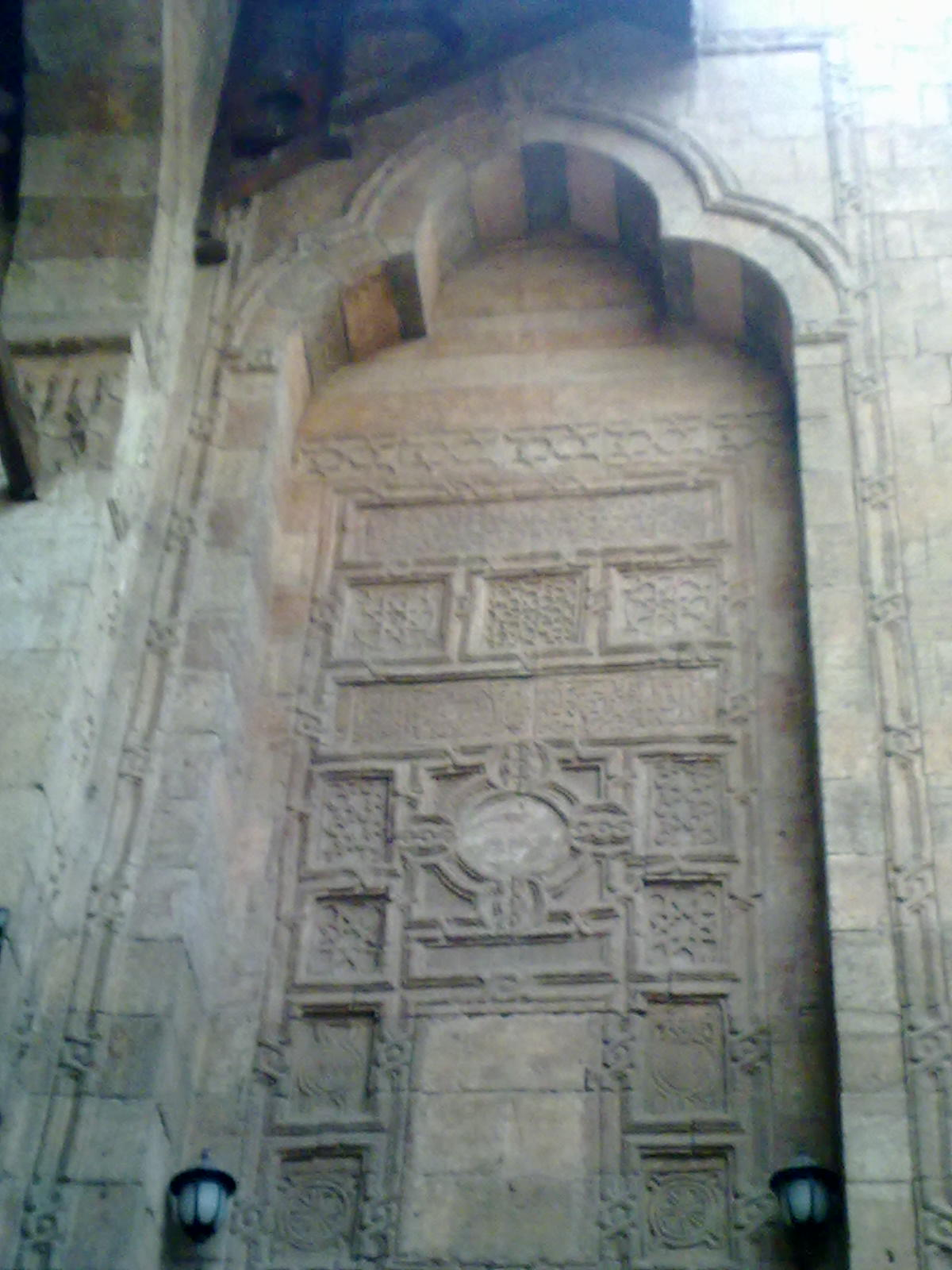
