= Don Quichotte (magazine) =

Weekly political magazine in Egypt (1939–1940)

- Editor: Henri Curiel
- Categories: Political magazine
- Frequency: Weekly
- Founder: Henri Curiel; Raoul Curiel; Georges Henein
- Founded: 1939
- First issue: 6 December 1939
- Final issue: May 1940
- Country: Egypt
- Based in: Cairo
- Language: French

Don Quichotte was a weekly Communist publication which existed between 1939 and 1940 in Cairo, Egypt. The title, which was given by Henri Curiel, a cofounder, was a reference to Gabriel Alomar, a Catalan poet and writer.

== History and profile ==
In 1939 Henri Curiel, Raoul Curiel and Georges Henein launched Don Quichotte, and the first issue appeared on 6 December that year. They were part of the Art et Liberté movement, and the magazine was one of the periodicals published by them. Henri Curiel was the editor of the magazine which was published in French on a weekly basis. Its headquarters was in Cairo. Don Quichotte covered social and class issues in addition to news from Egypt and other countries and featured articles about arts, science, fashion and sports. However, the ultimate goal was to create a platform to oppose the emerging threat of European Fascism.

The contributors were both Communists, including Raymond Aghion, Lutfallah Sulayma and Albert Simon, and artists, including Marcelle Biagini, Henri Dumani, Edouard Levy, Marcel Laurent Salinas, Sayf Wanli and Angelo de Riz. The former group was the members of the Democratic Union founded by Marxists while the latter group included Egyptian artists and intellectuals. Don Quichotte ceased publication in May 1940 after producing six issues.
