= Ikbal El Alaily =

Ikbal El Alaily (died 1984) also known as Iqbal El Alaily, was an Egyptian surrealist writer, and a co-founder of the journal, La Part du Sable. She was associated with the Art et Liberté art group.

== Life ==
Ikbal El Alaily, known to friends as Boula, was a granddaughter of the poet Ahmed Shawqi. Her parents were Muslim, though she was already a non believer by her teens. In 1939 she met and fell in love with Georges Henein. Despite parental opposition, the pair were inseparable, though they only formally married in 1954.

El Alaily's 1945 anthology, The Virtue of Germany, made the case for German romanticism as a precursor of surrealism.

After her husband's death in 1973, she prepared his unpublished work for publication. She died in 1984.

== Works ==
- Vertu de l'Allemagne [The Virtue of Germany]. Cairo: Editions Masses 1945
- 'De l'auteur considéré comme un jeune lapin' [Portrait of the Artist as a Young Rabbit], Le Part du Sable, No. 2, April 1950, pp. 30–2
