= Al Tatawwur =

Literary magazine in Egypt(1940)

- Categories: Literary magazine
- Frequency: Monthly
- Founder: Art et Liberté
- First issue: January 1940
- Final issue: July 1940
- Country: Egypt
- Based in: Cairo
- Language: Arabic

Al Tatawwur (Arabic: تطور, lit. 'The Development') was an Arabic language literary and cultural magazine published in Egypt in the period January–July 1940. It was the first avant-garde, surrealist and Marxist-libertarian publication in the Arab world.

== History and profile ==
Al Tatawwur was started by a radical leftist group called Art et Liberté or al fann wa al hurriyya (Arts and Freedom in English) in 1940, and the first issue appeared in January that year. The founder of the group was Kamel Telmissany which supported the revolutionary imagination and social freedom and had an anti-colonial stance. Al Tatawwur was the successor of another magazine entitled Al Majalla Al Jadida which was established by Salama Moussa and published between 1929 and 1944. The editor of Al Tatawwur was a surrealist intellectual, Anwar Kamel. He declared the goals of the magazine in the first issue as follows: "to defend the freedom of art and culture, to spread modern literary works, and to Egyptian youth with international literary, artistic, and social movements." The first issue also featured Arabic translations of the poems by the French surrealist Paul Éluard.

During its short lifetime Al Tatawwur frequently covered topics such as prostitution, sex and women's sexual freedom. The articles on women's sexual freedom were mostly written by Abdul Hamid Al Hadadi. Other contributor was Faisal Abdul Rahman Shahbander. Ramses Younan, a painter and writer, published art critics in the magazine.

Al Tatawwur was published on a monthly basis until July 1940 when it folded after producing seven issues. The magazine was closed down by the Egyptian authorities. Following the closure of Al Tatawwur its editor Anwar Kamel was jailed due to his writings published in the magazine.

== See also ==
- List of avant-garde magazines
