= Henri Curiel =

Jewish-Egyptian communist (1914–1978)

- Henri Curiel in the 1960s or 70s
- Born: 13 September 1914; Cairo, Khedivate of Egypt
- Died: 4 May 1978 (aged 63); Paris, France
- Cause of death: Assassination by gunshot

Henri Curiel (13 September 1914 – 4 May 1978) was a Jewish-Egyptian communist activist. Born in Egypt, he led the Democratic Movement for National Liberation until he was expelled from the country in 1950. Settling in France, Curiel aided the Algerian Front de Libération Nationale and other national liberation causes, including in South Africa and Latin America. He was also involved in Israeli-Palestinian peace efforts. In 1978 he was assassinated in Paris; his murderer has never been identified.

== Early life and family ==
Curiel was born in Cairo to an Italian Sephardic Jewish family on 13 September 1914. His mother was from Istanbul. His father, Daniel, was a banker, businessman, and landowner who owned property in Mansuriyya in the province of Giza, in Minufíyya, and in Qalyub. Curiel was first educated at a Jesuit school in Cairo and later at the École Française de Droit where he earned a B. A. degree in law. He became an Egyptian citizen in 1935. His brother Raoul Curiel became a respected archaeologist and numismatist, specializing in Central Asian studies. A cousin was Eugenio Curiel, a physicist and anti-fascist militant who was murdered in Italy in 1945. Another cousin was the British KGB spy George Blake. In a 1991 interview, Blake said that the older Curiel had been influential as a communist in shaping his political views, as Blake met him as a teenager.

== Political career in Egypt ==
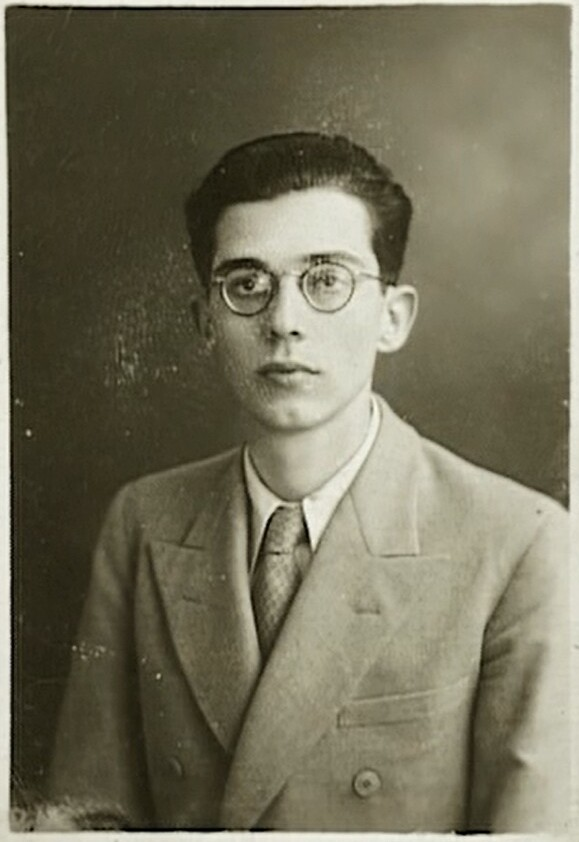
Curiel as a young student

He began reading Marxist works in 1936. In 1939 Curiel, his brother Raoul and Georges Henein launched Don Quichotte, a French language communist weekly. In 1943 he founded the communist Egyptian Movement for National Liberation (HAMETU) which in 1947 became the Democratic Movement for National Liberation (HADETU). He was repeatedly arrested, along with many other communists. Despite his Egyptian citizenship, he was forced to emigrate in 1950. Curiel settled in France and led a circle of Jewish communist emigres from Egypt known as the "Rome Group".

The Democratic Movement for National Liberation was an active participant in the 1952 revolution led by the free officers and Gamal Abdel Nasser. The revolutionary council and the free officers had many members from HADETU; the most eminent of these were Khaled Mohieddin, Yousef Seddik and Ahmed Hamroush.

== Anti-colonial activism in Paris ==
Curiel worked for the Jeanson network which supported the Front de Libération Nationale (FLN) during the Algerian War (1954–62). He was arrested by the French security services in 1960. Curiel was a founder of "Solidarité", a support group for various anti-colonial and opposition movements in the Third World (in particular Africa and Latin America), such as the African National Congress (ANC).

Beginning in the 1950s, Curiel initiated meetings in Europe between Israeli and Arab left-wing groups and individuals, working towards a resolution of the Arab-Israeli conflict. Participants in such meetings included Emile Habibi, Amos Kenan, members of Maki and of the Sudanese and Iraqi Communist Parties, and others. In 1976 he initiated contacts with Israeli and Palestinian representatives willing to negotiate a mutual recognition. Several meetings, later known as the "Paris talks", were organized. Under the chairmanship of Pierre Mendès France, they included Issam Sartawi, adviser to Yasser Arafat; and Uri Avnery and Mattityahu Peled, members of the Israeli Council for Israeli-Palestinian Peace (ICIPP).

On 21 June 1976, Georges Suffert published an article in Le Point naming Curiel as the "head of the terrorist support network", connected with the KGB. He was put under house arrest in Digne, an administrative measure that was lifted once the accusation was demonstrated to be untrue.

An American CIA report from 1981 (a Special National Intelligence Estimate) said that Curiel's organization "has provided support to a wide variety of Third World leftist revolutionary organizations", including "false documents, financial aid, and safehaven before and after operations, as well as some illegal training in France in weapons and explosives."

== Assassination ==
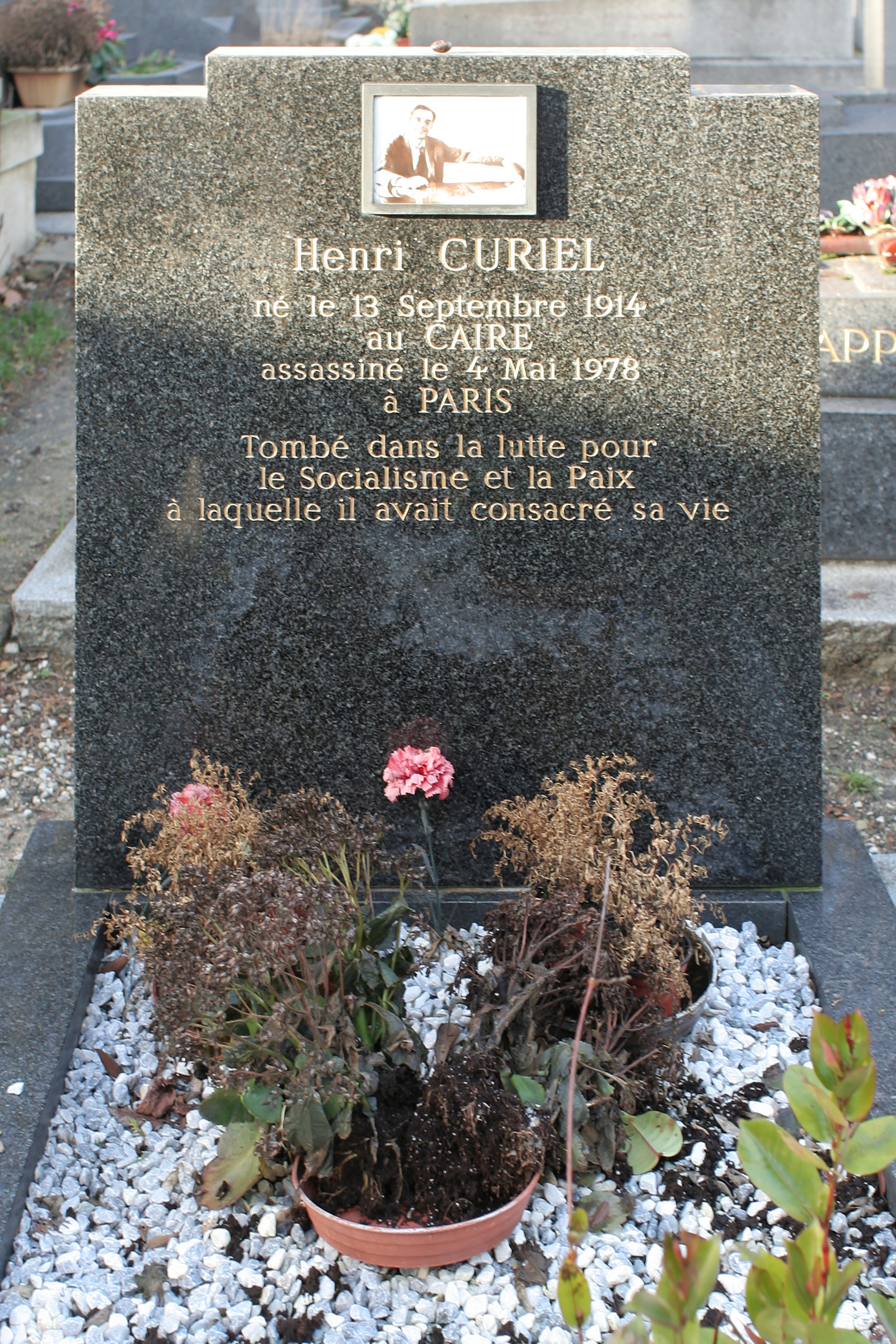
Curiel's grave at Père Lachaise Cemetery

Henri Curiel was assassinated in Paris on 4 May 1978. Two far-right groups (OAS and the Charles Martel Group) claimed responsibility, but the case is still unsolved.

Police and journalistic investigations suggest other suspects:

- Jean-Pierre Maïon, a French criminal linked to the SDECE and the OAS, who worked as an informant for Lucien Aimé-Blanc, may have killed Henri Curiel on behalf of a Spanish death squad
- Abu Nidal group (it allegedly later shot Issam Sartawi), allegedly commissioned by the KGB
- South African Bureau of State Security (because of Curiel's aid to the ANC)

== Personal life ==
His son is the French journalist Alain Gresh, who was born in Cairo in 1948. Gresh knew Curiel as a family friend and only learned in his late twenties that he was his son.

== Legacy ==
Henri Curiel is buried at Père Lachaise Cemetery, Paris.

Curiel's work in promoting dialogue between the PLO and left-wing Israelis was continued throughout the 1980s by the Comité Palestine et Israël Vivront, headed by Sorbonne lecturer Joyce Blau – Curiel's close associate and fellow Egyptian exile.

== In fiction ==
Henri Curiel appears in several parts of Ted Allbeury's 1982 spy thriller Shadow of Shadows, where he is depicted as George Blake's KGB contact.

== See also ==
- Pierre Goldman
- Adolfo Kaminsky
