= D'Arblay Street =

Street in Soho, London

Coordinates: 51.5145°N 0.1362°W

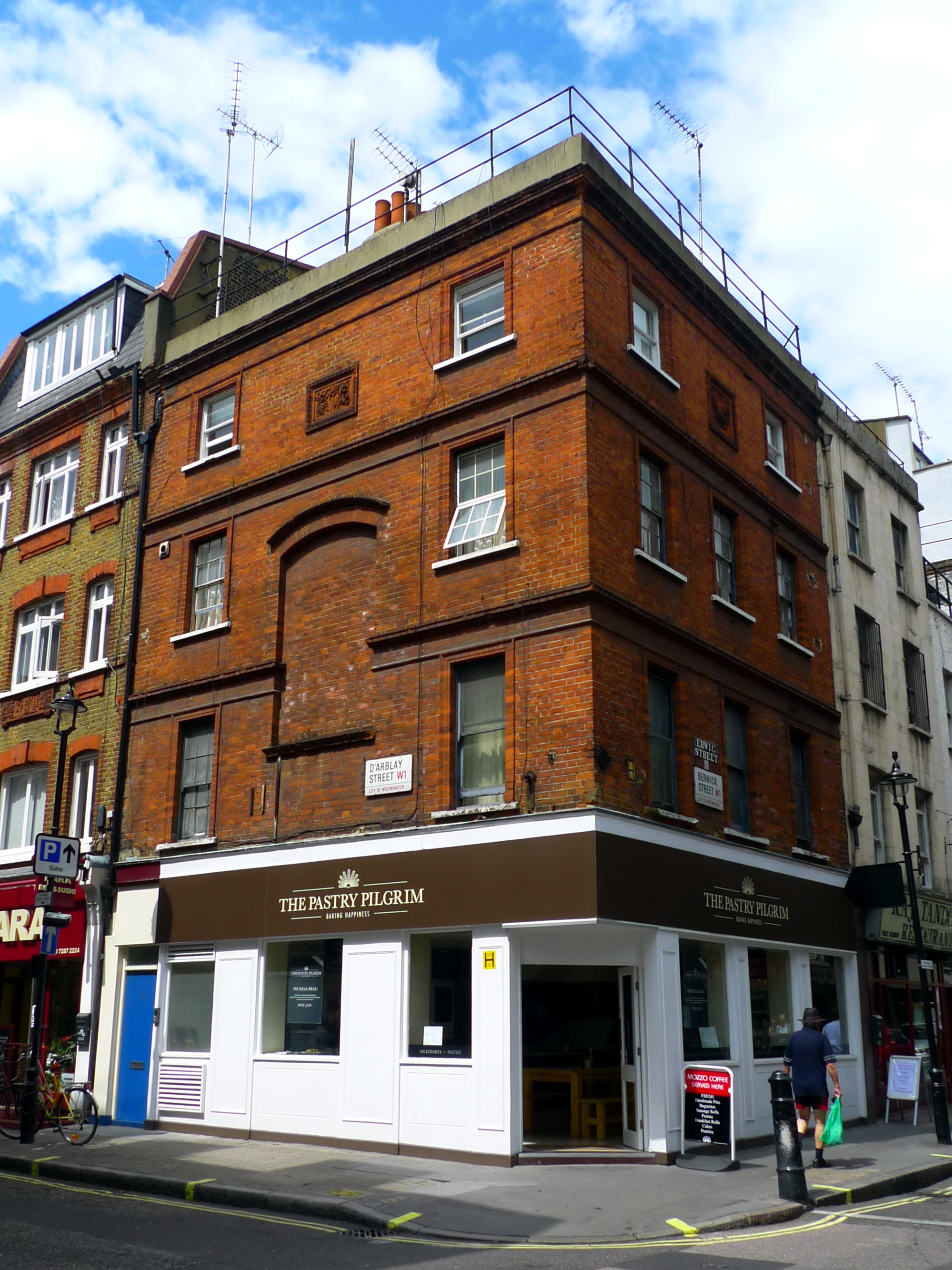
The former Britannia public house at 8 D'Arblay Street on the corner with Berwick Street. (north side)

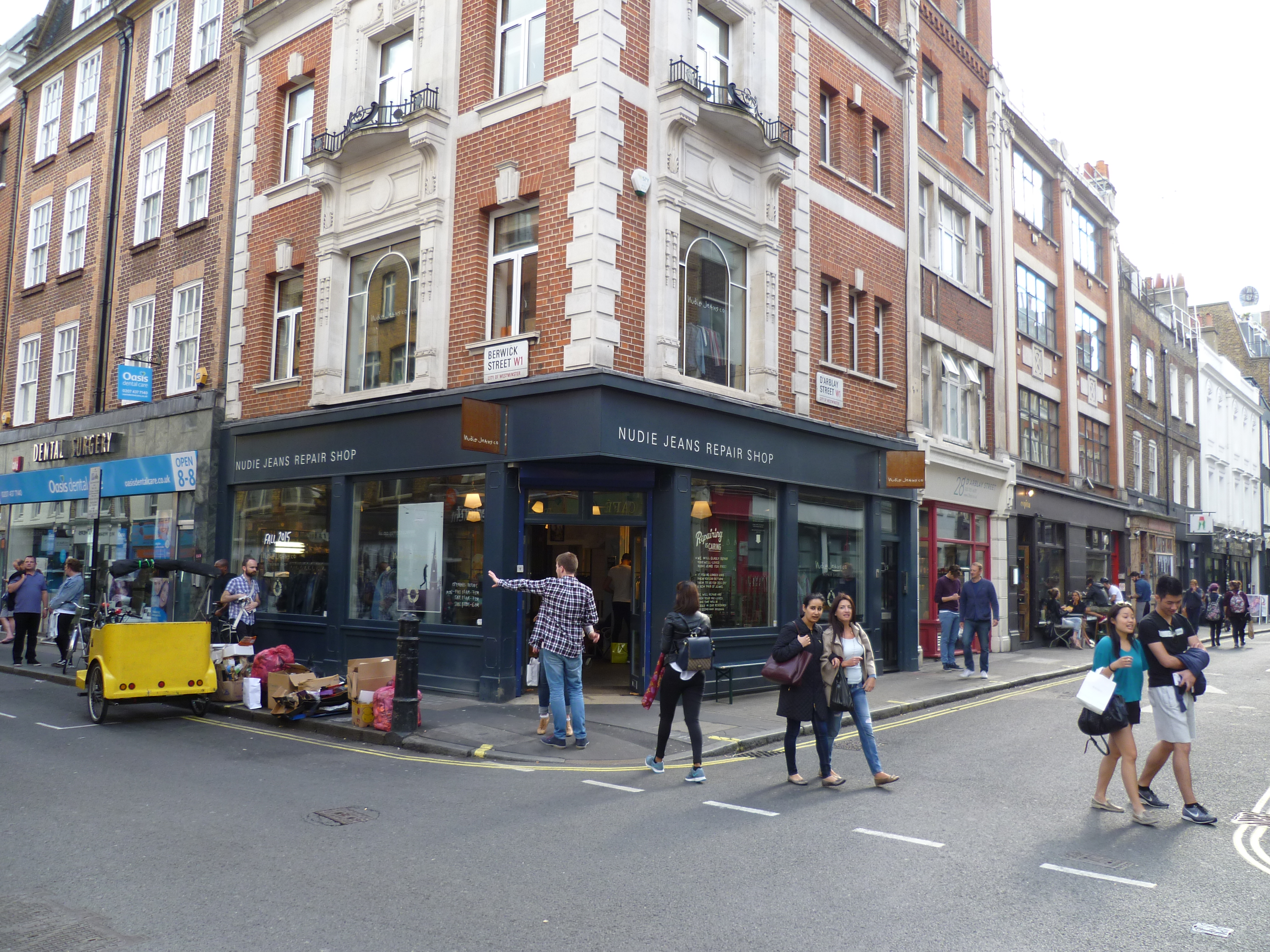
The corner of D'Arblay Street and Berwick Street. (south side)

D'Arblay Street is a street in the Soho district of the City of Westminster, London, named after Frances Burney (Madame d'Arblay). It was formerly known as Portland Street and was built on land owned by the Dukes of Portland known as Doghouse Close.

D'Arblay Street runs from Poland Street in the west to Wardour Street in the east. It is crossed only by Berwick Street. On its south side are Portland Mews and Wardour Mews.

== History ==
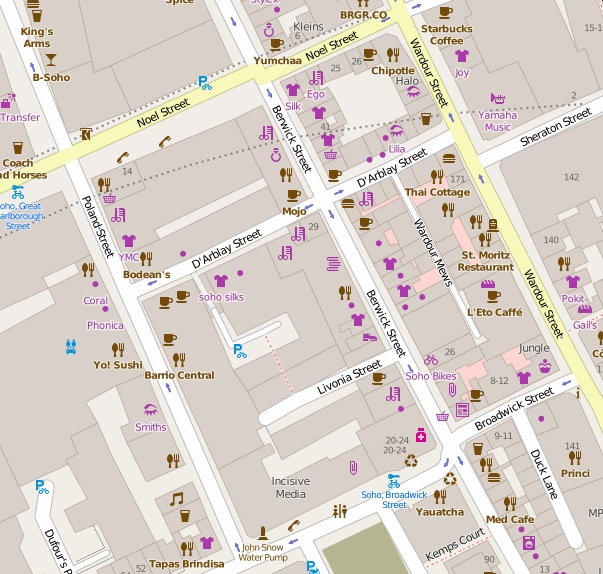
The immediate vicinity of D'Arblay Street.

D'Arblay Street was laid out in 1735 as Portland Street on the site of the former Doghouse Close, the same land on which Noel Street and the north part of Berwick Street were built. The land was in the ownership of the Dukes of Portland, and leases were granted by the Duke, and the Duchess of Portland when the Duke was a minor, to building tradesmen such as masons and bricklayers to enable houses to be erected.

The first houses in Portland Street were built in 1737 and the street was completed by around 1744. The earliest buildings in the street are numbers 2–4, 10, 11, 13, 24 and 25, which all date from around 1740. Numbers 20–23 and 32–34 have nineteenth-century fronts but may incorporate the structure of earlier buildings. The remainder of the buildings are more recent.

The George public house is located at the eastern end on the corner with Berwick Street. A public house has stood on the site since at least 1739. The current building was constructed in 1897. No. 8 D'Arblay Street was formerly The Britannia public house owned by Watney Combe Reid.

A Welsh Wesleyan chapel existed at number 16 towards the end of the nineteenth century.

In 1909, the street was renamed D'Arblay Street after Madame D'Arblay whose childhood home (1760–1770) was at number 50 in nearby Poland Street.
