= Ramses Younan =

Egyptian painter (1913–1966)

- Born: 1913; Minya, Egypt
- Died: 1966 (aged 52–53); Cairo, Egypt
- Occupations: Artist, painter, writer
- Years active: 1933–1966
- Known for: Art et Liberté

Ramses Younan (رمسيس يونان; Minya, 1913 – Cairo, 1966), also spelled Ramses Younane, was an Egyptian painter and writer. His work is most commonly associated with the Art and Liberty Group, a Cairo-based surrealist collective of artists, writers, intellectuals and activists with an anti-nationalist message.

== Early life and career ==
Ramses Younan was born into a poor, Coptic-Christian family in Minya, a city approximately 150 miles south of Cairo and along the western bank of the Nile River. In 1929 he enrolled in the Faculty of Fine Arts in Cairo but left in 1933 to teach drawing in secondary schools in various regional towns throughout Egypt after receiving his teaching certificate in 1934. In the years between 1933 and 1938, he was a regular participant in art salons hosted by the Friends of the Fine Arts Association. Before officially joining Georges Henein in Art et Liberté in 1939, Younan joined The Society for the Promotion of Art (Jamaa'at al-di'aya al-fanniyya) in 1935. It was "a collective established by artist Habib Gorgui calling for the importance of art in education." In 1938, the Society published his first book The Aim of the Contemporary Artist in which he analyzed the work of the French cubist painter Amédée Ozenfant and his theories of Purism. In 1939, along with Georges Henein, Ikbal El Alaily, and Edmond Jabès, Ramses Younan founded the surrealist journal La Part du Sable. He was also a prominent member of the leftist art and political group Art et Liberté and signed their manifesto "Long Live Degenerate Art!" on 22 December 1938.

== Writing and painting career ==
As a writer, he edited the magazine Al Majalla Al Jadida (Arabic: The New Magazine), in which Art and Liberty's manifesto was first published, between 1943 and 1945. During this time, Younan also published his own Arabic translations of works and essays such as Albert Camus' Caligula, Franz Kafka's Une médecin de campagne and Arthur Rimbaud's Une saison en enfer. In 1947, he left Egypt for Paris after the disbanding of Art and Liberty and "a short time spent in prison." and resided there for the following nine years. While in France, he acted "as editorial secretary for the Arabic department in the French broadcasting service." In the same year (1947) Younan participated in the International Surrealist Exhibitions in Paris and Prague and signed Rupture Inaugurale, the collective manifesto published by the Parisian Surrealists. After Art and Liberty's demise, Younan worked almost exclusively in an abstract style, most of which was shown in his first solo exhibition held in 1948 at the Gallery Nina Dausset, Paris. His foray into abstraction was facilitated by his interest in form and space and his aversion to certain aspects of surrealism as defined by the Paris Surrealists. He maintained his abstract style until his death in 1966. He also published in 1948 a dialogue with Henein, Notes sur une ascèse hystérique, strongly criticizing Surrealist automatism. Even before his break with surrealism, Younan was critical of European Surrealism which he felt was "too premeditated" and did not allow for full use of the subconscious. He also felt that it focused too much on the individual instead of embracing the collective. Instead, he called for, what he referred to as, "Subjective Realism" or Free Art, "an active mining of the unconscious fused with local imagery that would be familiar to Egyptians, but not fetishistic or nationalistic."

Younan returned to Cairo in 1956 after being exiled from France for refusing to condemn the Egyptian government on French radio. Back in Egypt, he faced an increasingly stifling political and cultural climate, but remained true to his principles and his views on art and freedom. In 1960, he "received a grant from the Egyptian Ministry of Culture that allowed him to devote his full time to painting." He also published articles in Al Tatawwur which was the successor of Al Majallah Al Jadidah, a magazine he edited in the 1940s.

His work, among other Art and Liberty members, was on display at the Palace of Arts in Cairo, Egypt as part of a long-term traveling exhibition co-organized by the Sharjah Art Foundation, the Ministry of Culture in Egypt and Cairo's American University in 2016.

== Writings ==
- « Ghayat al-rassam al-'asri (The Aim of the Contemporary Artist) », essay on Amédée Ozenfant, ed. Gamaat Habib, 1938
- « Notes sur une ascèse hystérique (Notes on a Hysterical Asceticism) », dialogue with Georges Henein, Cairo, 1948
- « La Quatrième dimension vaut la première : œuvres incomplètes (The Fourth Dimension is worth the first: incomplete works) », La Nouvelle part du sable, 2002

== Bibliography ==
- Azar, Aimé. Les Inquiets, 1938–1946. [The Restless, 1938–1946]. Cairo: Imprimerie Française, 1954.
- Karnouk, Liliane. Modern Egyptian Art, 1910–2003. New York: American University in Cairo Press, 2005.
- Shārūnī, Ṣubḥī. al-Muthaqqaf al-mutamarrid, Ramsīs Yūnān [The Intellectual Rebel]. Cairo: al-Hayʼah al-Miṣrīyah al-ʻĀmmah lil-Kitāb bi-al-taʻāwun maʻa al-Jamʻīyah al-Miṣrīyah li-Nuqqād al-Fann al-Tashkīlī, 1992.
- Adam Biro & René Passeron « Dictionnaire général du surréalisme et de ses alentours », Office du Livre, Fribourg, Suisse et Presses universitaires de France, Paris, 1982, biography by Édouard Jaguer, p. 431.
