= 1935–1936 protests in Egypt =

Anti-colonial civil unrest

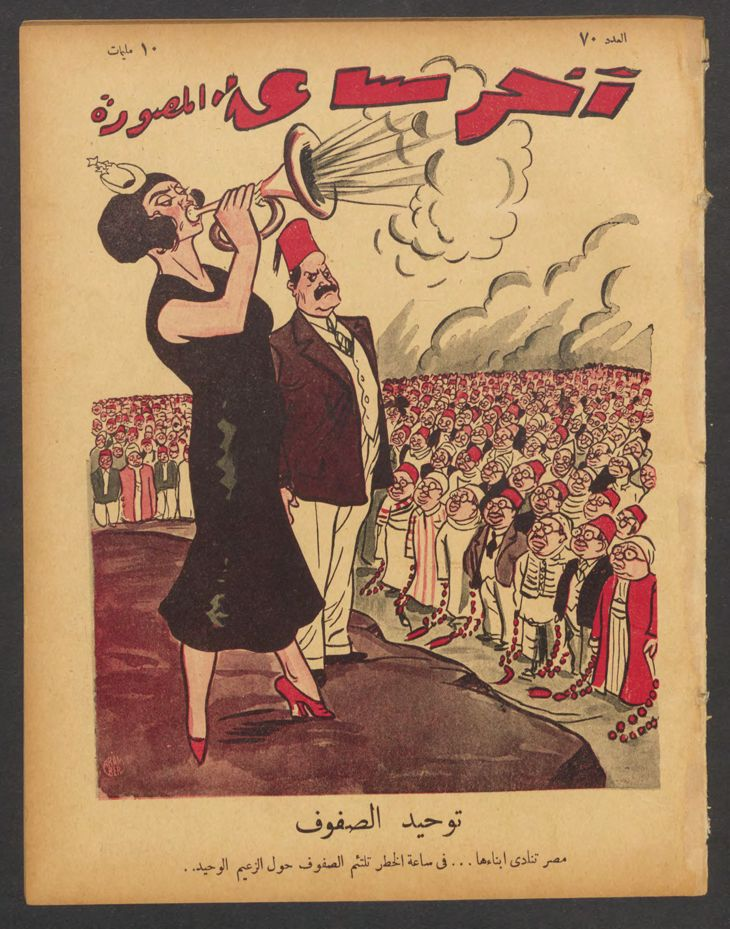
- Front page political cartoon from Ahker Sa'a on November 10th 1935: "Unifying the Ranks: Egypt calls on its sons, in the hour of danger, the rank close around the sole leader"
- Date: November 11, 1935 – May 2, 1936
- Location: Egypt
- Caused by: Egyptian nationalism
- Goals: Restoration of the 1923 Constitution
- Result: Abrogation of the 1930 Constitution (Nov 30, 1935); Restoration of the 1923 Constitution (Dec 12, 1935); Wafd victory in 1936 elections

Parties
Wafd Party	British Government
Liberal Constitutional Party	Fuad I of Egypt
Young Egypt Party	Prime Minister Mohamed Tawfik Naseem Pasha
Non-Partisan Students

The 1935-36 protests in Egypt were a series of student led nationalist uprisings in Egypt. These demonstrations were against the ministry of Mohamed Tawfik Naseem Pasha as well as British colonial influence in Egypt. The protests resulted in the restoration of the 1923 Egyptian constitution, the resignation of Nassem, a victory for the Wafd party in the 1936 elections and the 1936 Anglo-Egyptian Treaty.

== History ==
Following the 1919 Egyptian revolution, politics in Egypt were divided between the British colonial authorities, the monarchy and conservative elite and the liberal nationalist Wafd party. While a de facto native Egyptian government existed, the British still had substantial control over Egypt, including control of Sudan and the Suez Canal. The British had a policy of balancing power between the Wafd and the palace, concerned both by a palace dictatorship and a Wafdist republic. The 1923 constitution made Egypt into a constitutional monarchy, where the king has substantial powers, such as dismissing prime ministers. The Wafd party won a majority in every election under the 1923 constitution, yet frequently clashed with King Fuad and his conservative allies. In 1930, prime minister Ismail Sidky instituted a new constitution and electoral law, further siphoning away power from parliament and electorate while increasing the king's ability to dominate politics. The Wafd and Liberal Constitutionalists, led by Mohammad Mahmud, boycotted the rigged 1931 elections in protest, and agreed to protest against the government.

Sidky resigned in late 1933, replaced by Abdel Fattah Yahya Pasha. The Wafd continued their opposition to the government, determined to restore the 1923 constitution. King Fuad's health was failing at this point, leading to the appointment of a three man regency in the event of his death. The British were against anyone in the regency that could be too anti-British, pressuring Yahya to remove Zaki al-Ibrashi from the Council of Chief of the Royal Cabinet in favor of Ahmad Ziwar. Yahya later resigned in favor of Nassim. Nassim agreed to abrogate the 1930 constitution, securing Wafdist support for his government, yet was unable to find British support for the restoration of the 1923 constitution. The Wafd's decision to support Nassim's government was not uncontroversial. The journalist for Rose al Yusuf Abbas Mahmud al-Aqqad left the Wafd in protest. Mustafa el-Nahhas, the leader of the Wafd, and Makram Ebeid supported a moderate attitude to Nassim's government, while Ahmad Mahir, and Mahmud Fahmi al-Nuqrashi were more militant and determined to bring down the government.

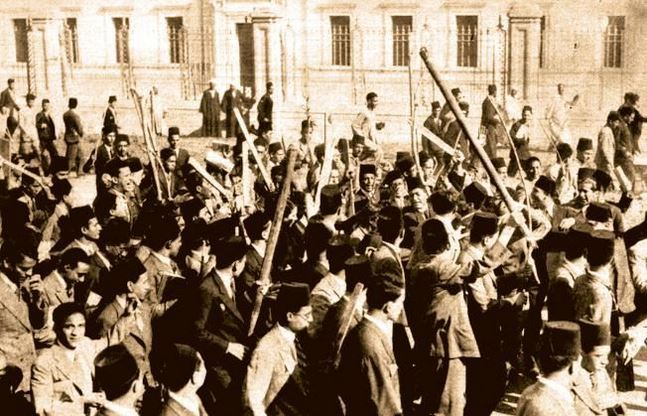
Protestors demonstrating on Abbas Bridge

On November 7, 1935, a mass rally of around 10,000 to 12,000 people took place, attended by Mahir, Nuqrashi, Mahmud and Aqqad. Mahmud attacked Nassim for "selling out the country to the British". Two days later, British foreign secretary Samuel Hoare gave a speech where he declared the 1923 constitution as "unworkable". This speech transformed the constitutional conflict into a nationalist one against the British. Demonstrators marched through Cairo shouting "Down with Nasim and Samuel Hoare", and demanded a return to the 1923 constitution. The protests were across the country, but there were a few key epicentres, namely Cairo, Shebeen El-Kom, Tanta, and Zagazig. In one incident, three Egyptian University students were killed in Cairo by British police. Gamal Abdel Nasser, then a law student, briefly joined Young Egypt during these protests. The students urged the political parties to form a National Front against the British.

The Wafd party, determined not to become the target of the student's anger, officially withdrew support from Nassim's government on November 14. No one political party controlled the students. Instead, sometime between Mahmud's speech on the 7th and Nahhas' speech on the 13th, a group called The Student Executive Committee was formed, which represented a diverse cross section of Egyptian political society. The group contained Wafdists (Suhayr al-Qalamawi and Muhammad Bilal) as well as members of the Watani Party, Young Egypt and the Liberal Constitutionalists.

In early December, Nahhas and Liberals finally agreed to form a 'National Front'. The 1923 constitution was restored on 12 December, though Nahhas and Mahmud still had conflicting interests. Nahhas wanted immediate elections, in which the Wafd would win, while Mahmud wanted a coalition government and then move on to negotiating with the British. The student committee split between the Wafdist and Liberals by the 17th. The Wafd, determined not to be outflanked on the nationalist by the Liberals, formed the 'Blue Shirts' in January 1936, a pro-Wafd youth wing organized by Bilal to lead the students against the enemies of the Wafd: namely the Liberals, British, the King and Young Egypt's 'Green Shirts'. The Wafd was unable to come to an agreement with the other parties to form a coalition government, leading them to contest elections alone.

Ali Maher was appointed by the King on 30 January 1936 to lead a transitional government until new elections. The 1936 election saw a complete Wafdist victory; Nahhas became prime minister. On 13 February, a royal decree appointed a team to negotiate with the British, including: Nahhas as president, Muhammad Mahmud, Sidqi, Yahya, Wassif Butrus Ghali, Ahmad Mahir, Ali Shamsi Pasha, Ebeid and al-Nuqrashi. This team was able to secure the 1936 Anglo-Egyptian Treaty which granted Egypt some more domestic control in exchange for allowing a British military presence, especially since the Italian invasion of Ethiopia raised Egyptian concerns over Italian imperialism.

== See also ==
- Egyptian Revolution of 1919
- 2011 Egyptian Revolution

== Sources ==
- Erlich, Haggai (1989). "The 1935–6 Student Riots: The Decline of the Wafd". Students and University in 20th Century Egyptian Politics. Routledge. ISBN 9781135778972.
- Abdalla, Ahmed (1985). The Student Movement and National Politics in Egypt, 1923-1973. American University in Cairo Press. ISBN 9789774161995.
- el-Din Aly, Mohammed Alaa (1985). Mustafa Al-Nahhas: a Case Study of Egyptian Political Leadership (PDF) (Thesis). University of London.
- Terry, Janice J. (1982). The Wafd: Cornerstone of Egyptian Political Power. Publisher: Third World Centre for Research and Publishing. ISBN 9780861990009.
- Deeb, Marius (1979). Party Politics in Egypt: the Wafd & its Rivals 1919–1939. Ithaca Press. ISBN 9780903729406.
- Marsot, Afaf Lutfi Al-Sayyid (1977). Egypt's Liberal Experiment: 1922–1936. University of California Press. ISBN 9780520031098.
- Jankowski, James P. (1970). "The Egyptian Blue Shirts and the Egyptian Wafd, 1935–1938". Middle Eastern Studies. 6 (1): 77–95. doi:10.1080/00263207008700139. JSTOR 4282308.
- Quraishi, Zaheer M. (1967). Liberal Nationalism in Egypt; Rise and Fall of the Wafd Party. Jamal Printing Press. ISBN 9780861990009.
- Gibb, H. A. R (1936). "The Situation in Egypt". International Affairs. 15 (3): 351–373. doi:10.2307/2603087. JSTOR 2603087.
