= Elections in Egypt =

Elections in Egypt are held for the president and a bicameral legislature. The president of Egypt is elected for a six-year term by popular vote after draft amendments to the 2013 constitution altered the presidential term limits from the original four years to six years. With the exception of the 2012 Egyptian presidential election after the Egyptian Revolution, elections in Egypt have neither been free nor fair and taken place in authoritarian contexts. Since Abdel Fattah el-Sisi overthrew Mohamed Morsi in the 2013 Egyptian coup d'état, el-Sisi has headed an authoritarian government in Egypt.

Suffrage is universal and compulsory for every Egyptian citizen over 18. Failure to vote can result in a fine or even imprisonment, but in practice, a significant percentage of eligible voters do not vote. About 63 million voters are registered to vote out of a population of more than 100 million. Turnout in the 2011 parliamentary election was 54%. Egypt was ranked 9th least electoral democracy in the Middle East and North Africa according to V-Dem Democracy indices in 2023 with a score of 0.175 out of 1.

== Result ==
=== Presidential ===
==== 1956 Egyptian referendum ====
Candidate	Party	Votes	%
Gamal Abdel Nasser	Liberation Rally	5,499,555	99.90
Against		5,267	0.10
Total		5,504,822	100.00

==== 1976 Egyptian presidential confirmation referendum ====
Candidate	Party	Votes	%
Anwar Sadat	Arab Socialist Union (Egypt)	9,145,683	99.94
Against		5,605	0.06
Total		9,151,288	100.00

==== 1981 Egyptian presidential confirmation referendum ====
Candidate	Party	Votes	%
Hosni Mubarak	National Democratic Party (Egypt)	9,567,904	98.46
Against		149,650	1.54
Total		9,717,554	100.00

=== Parliamentary ===
==== 1964 United Arab Republic parliamentary election ====
Party	Seats
Arab Socialist Union (Egypt)	350
Presidential appointees	10
Total	360

==== 1976 Egyptian parliamentary election ====
Party	Seats
Egyptian Arab Socialist Party	295
Liberal Socialists Party (Egypt)	15
National Progressive Unionist Rally Party	3
Independents	47
Total	360

== Kingdom of Egypt (1922–1953) ==
The Kingdom of Egypt was granted nominal independence by the United Kingdom on 28 February 1922. Between the Declaration of 1922 and the Revolution of 1952, ten general elections were held (in 1924, 1925, 1926, 1929, 1931, 1936, 1938, 1942, 1945 and 1950). This era is generally known as Egypt's Liberal Experiment. Egypt has never recovered the level of political freedom it enjoyed during this period, except for the period from the 2011 revolution to the 2013 coup.

During the four elections held between 1924 and 1929, candidates from the Coptic Christian minority received 15 to 23 seats. Copts received four seats in 1931, six in 1938, 12 in 1945, and five in 1950. The opposition's share of seats also varied throughout this period. The opposition won 15.1% of the seats in the 1924 election, 18.9% in 1926, 6.9% in 1929, 18.1% in 1936, 12.1% in 1942, and 29.2% in the 1950 election, the last to be held before the 1952 Revolution which ended Egypt's multi-party system.

Electoral performance of the Wafd Party and Big Landowners during the monarchy
Electoral year	Total seats in the Chamber of Deputies	Wafd Party		Big Landowners	
Electoral year	Total seats in the Chamber of Deputies	Seats won	Percentage	Seats won	Percentage
1924	214	181	84.6	93	43.5
1925	214	113	52.8	95	44.4
1926	214	172	80.4	105	49.1
1929	235	212	90.2	108	45.9
1931	150	0	0.0	58	38.7
1936	232	180	77.6	112	48.3
1938	264	14	5.3	131	49.6
1942	264	203	76.9	93	35.2
1945	285	0	0.0	123	43.2
1950	317	157	49.5	119	37.5

== Elections under the Mubarak regime ==
=== 2005 presidential election ===
Under the Mubarak era, the Egyptian presidential election of 2005 was the first-ever multi-party, multi-candidate contested presidential election in Egypt's history, made under the 2005/2007 constitutional amendments to the 1971 Constitution of Egypt. Despite its significance, the election was marred by voter fraud, ballot stuffing, boycotts, intimidation, vote-buying, and protests by opposition groups, leading to a low turnout of under 30%. Before the 2005 election, the president of Egypt was nominated by a two-thirds majority of the rubber-stamp People's Assembly and approved under a referendum process that resembles a show election in authoritarian countries.

=== 2010 parliamentary elections ===
Under the Mubarak era, The People's Assembly and Shura Council were elected under an electoral system of single member plurality. Along with the combination of voter fraud, ballot stuffing, intimidation, and lack of judicial and international supervision, this ensured the NDP a super-majority win of seats for both houses. The Muslim Brotherhood was not recognized as a political party by the law, but its members were allowed to run as independents.

== Next elections ==
Egyptian presidential elections are held using a two-round system; the next election should be held in 2030.

The House of Representatives sits for a five-year term but can be dissolved earlier by the president.

== Referendums ==
The first referendum in Egypt was held on 23 June 1956. The electorate agreed with the adoption of the new Egyptian Constitution of 1956, and with the election of Gamal Abdel Nasser as President of Egypt.

== See also ==
- National Elections Authority, authority responsible for managing and supervising elections in Egypt
- Electoral calendar
- Electoral system
- 2019 Egyptian constitutional referendum

== Bibliography ==
- Landau, Jacob M. (1953). Parliaments and Parties in Egypt (PhD thesis). Tel Aviv: Israel Pub. House. OCLC 3263523. Archived from the original on 2008-04-11 – via Questia.
- den Hartog, Michael (1996–1998). A Two-Way Approach to Stability in the Arab Southern Mediterranean Coastal States: Theories on Democracy and International Cooperation Applied to Developments Regarding Political Stability in Algeria, Egypt, Libya, Morocco, and Tunisia (PDF) (Report). NATO Academic Forum.
