= Mohammed Hussein Heikal =

Egyptian writer

Mohammed Hussein Heikal محمد حسين هيكل
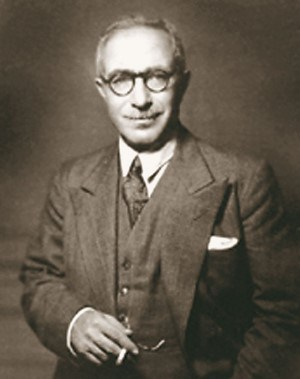
- Photograph of Heikal
- Born: August 20, 1888; Kafr Ghannam, Mansoura, Ad-Daqahliyah Governorate, Egypt
- Died: December 8, 1956 (aged 68); Cairo, Egypt
- Political party: Liberal Constitutional Party

Mohammed Hussein Heikal (Note: Also spelt Haikal, Haekal, or Haykal.) (Arabic: محمد حسين هيكل Egyptian Arabic pronunciation: [mæˈħæmmæd ħeˈseːn ˈheːkæl]; August 20, 1888 – December 8, 1956) was an Egyptian writer, journalist, politician. He held several cabinet posts, including minister of education. He was the first Egyptian, Arab, Middle Easterner and African to earn a Habilitation from the Sorbonne University. He was the author of the first arabic language novel and the first to write about prophet Muhammad and Caliphs Abu Bakr, Umar and Uthman from a scientific perspective.

== Life ==
Haekal was born in Kafr Ghannam, Mansoura, Ad-Daqahliyah Governorate in 1888. He obtained a B.A. in Law in 1909 and a Ph.D. from the Sorbonne University in Paris in 1912. While a student in Paris, he composed what is considered the first authentic Egyptian novel, Zaynab. After returning to Egypt, he worked as a lawyer for 10 years, then as a journalist. He published articles in Al Jarida. He was the cofounder of Al Siyasa newspaper, the organ of the Liberal Constitutionalist party for which he was also an adviser and was also elected as its editor-in-chief. In 1937, he was appointed as minister of state for the interior ministry in Muhammad Mahmoud Pasha's second government. In November 1940 he was appointed minister of education to the cabinet led by Hussein Sirri Pasha. In this post he introduced several reforms, including decentralization, by establishing educational zones and making programs and curricula nationally oriented. He was greatly influenced and inspired by the comprehensive reforms of Muhammad Abduh, Ahmed Lutfi el-Sayed and Qasim Amin. One of his protégés was the historian Husayn Fawzi al-Najjar.

Heikal is the father of seven children: Ateya, Taheya, Hussein, Hedeya, Bahiga, Fayza Haikal, and Ahmad. Fayza teaches Egyptology at the American University in Cairo.

== Writing ==
Many critics have considered the novel Zeinab, written by Heikal 1913, as the 'first modern Egyptian novel. However, some scholars have debated this, with Elliott Colla reaching a conclusion that this label had more to do with "the needs of national institutions such as the cinema, the Parliament, or Cairo University, at moments of formation or reformation than it does with the texts themselves." Colla went on to conclude that Zaynab became recognized as part of the national literary tradition not at the moment of its initial production but in subsequent circumstances of reception and reproduction tied to other non-literary significances.

His works include:

- Zaynab, (زينب) 1914.
- Biographies of Egyptian and Western Personalities, 1929.
- The Life of Muhammad, 1933. (حياة محمد)
- In the House of Revelation, 1939. (فى منزل الوحى)
- "Ten days in the Sudan" (عشرة أيام فى السودان)
- Sayyidina Al-Faruq Omar, 1944/45.
- Memories on Egyptian politics, 1951-53. (مذكرات فى السياسة المصرية)
- Thus Was I Created, 1955.
- Faith, Knowledge and Philosophy, published in 1964.
- The Islamic Empire and sacred places, published in 1964.
- Egyptian short stories, published in 1967.
- Sayyidina Uthman Ibn Affan, published in 1968.
- Mehraj-ud-din beigh, Arabic master
