= Muhammad Ali Alluba =

Egyptian lawyer and diplomat

- محمد علي علوبة

Ministry of Religious Endowments
- In office 13 March 1925 – 7 June 1926
- Prime Minister: Ahmed Zeiwar Pasha
- Preceded by: Muhammad Sidqi Pasha
- Succeeded by: Muhammad Najeeb Al-Gharabli Pasha
- In office 9 December 1946 – 28 December 1948
- Prime Minister: Mahmoud El Nokrashy Pasha
- Preceded by: Ibrahim Desouki Abaza Pasha
- Succeeded by: Ali Abdel Razzaq Pasha

Minister of Education
- In office 30 January 1936 – 9 May 1936
- Prime Minister: Aly Maher Pasha
- Preceded by: Ahmed Naguib el-Hilaly
- Succeeded by: Ali Zaki El-Araby

Minister of Parliamentary Affairs
- In office 18 August 1939 – 27 June 1940 Serving with Ibrahim Abdel Hady Pasha
- Prime Minister: Aly Maher Pasha

Ambassador of Egypt to Pakistan
- Succeeded by: Abdel Wahab Mohamed Azzam

Personal details
- Born: November 1875 or 1878
- Died: 25 March 1956
- Party: Liberal Constitutional Party
- Other political affiliations: Wafd Party

Muhammad 'Ali 'Alluba (Arabic: محمد علي علوبة, November 1875 or 1878 - 25 March 1956) was an Egyptian lawyer, Arab nationalist and diplomat.

== History ==
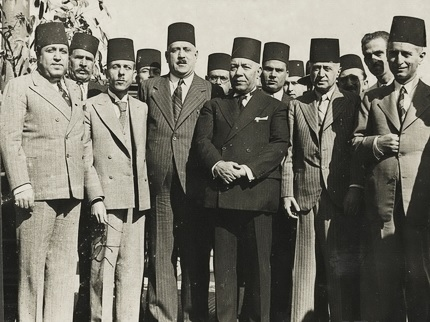
Muhammad Alluba with Arab leaders in Cairo, 1930s

He was born in Asyut to the owner of a flower mill. He graduated from the Khedivial Law School in 1899 and opened his first office in Asyut. He was on the administrative board of the National Party from 1907 to 1914, elected to the assembly in 1914. He joined the Wafd in 1918, as was a member of the original delegation and the second high command. He then left in 1921 to found the Liberal Constitutional Party in 1922. He resigned from his post of minister of endowments in 1925 after the expulsion of Ali Abdel Raziq from Al-Azhar. In 1929 he was secretary-general of the party. He was minister of endowments in 1925 and 1946, (Note: Goldshmidt's Biographical Dictionary of Modern Egypt claims that he was minister of parliamentary affairs in 1946, yet Younan Labib Rizk's The History of the Egyptian Ministries 1878-1953, which contains the exact details of the cabinets of this time, claims that he was minister of endowments.) minister of education in 1936, and of parliamentary affairs in 1939.

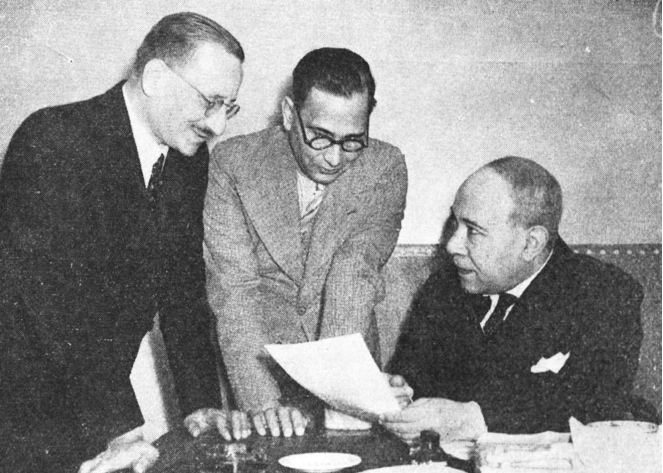
From left to right: Abdurrahman Siddiqi, Choudhry Khaliquzzaman, and Muhammad Ali Alluba, Cairo, 1938

Alluba was a supporter of Arabism and the Palestinian cause. He testified to the Wailing Wall Commission in 1930. He was a member of the Egyptian delegation to the 1931 Islamic Congress in Jerusalem, alongside Azzam Pasha and Rashid Rida. Alluba served as both vice president and treasurer of the congress and also chaired the committee over the question of holy sites in Jerusalem. He was also the head of the executive committee of the 1938 'World Parliamentary Congress of Arab and Muslim Countries for the Defense of Palestine'. On 28 May 1939, he helped arrange a petition signed by eighty Egyptian legislators supporting the Arab Higher Committee, calling for the end of Jewish immigration to Palestine and an independent Arab state in Palestine.

During the political crisis between Saudi Arabia and Yemen preceding the 1934 Saudi-Yemini war, Alluba was a member of a commission formed by the General Arab Union in Cairo in March 1934 to study and resolve the conflict. He, alongside Muhammad Amin al-Husayni, Shakib Arslan and Hashim al-Atasi, was a member of a team appointed by the executive committee of the General Islamic Conference in Jerusalem that arrived in Mecca on 14 April.

He was also the head of the Egyptian Lawyers' Syndicate in 1937 and was Egypt's first ambassador to Pakistan in 1948. He died in Cairo on 25 March 1956.

== Works ==
- Social and Political Memories (الذكريات الاجتماعية والسياسية), his memoirs
- Palestine and its neighbors: Causes and consequences (فلسطين وجاراتها) 1954
- Palestine and the Human Conscience (فلسطين والضمير الإنساني) 1964
- Principles in Egyptian politics (مبادئ في السياسة المصرية) 1942

== Sources ==
- Deeb, Marius (1979). Party Politics in Egypt: the Wafd & its rivals 1919–1939. Ithaca Press. ISBN 9780903729406.
- El-Awaisi, AbdAl-Fattah Muhammad (1998). The Muslim Brothers and the Palestine Question 1928-1947. Tauris Academic Studies. ISBN 9781860640773.
- El-Shalak, Ahmed Zakaria (1982). حزب الأحرار الدستوريين [Constitutional Liberal Party: 1922 -1953] (in Arabic). Dar Shorouq.
- Gershoni, Israel; Jankowski, James P. (2002). Redefining the Egyptian Nation, 1930-1945. Cambridge University Press. ISBN 9780521523301.
- ————————; ———————— (1987). Egypt, Islam, and the Arabs: The Search for Egyptian Nationhood, 1900-1930. Oxford University Press. ISBN 9780195364866.
- Goldschmidt Jr, Arthur (2000). "'Alluba, Muhammad 'Ali". Biographical Dictionary of Modern Egypt. Lynne Rienner Publishers. pp. 19–20. ISBN 9781555872298.
- Mayer, Thomas (1983). Egypt and the Palestine question (1936-1945). Walter de Gruyter GmbH & Co KG. ISBN 9783112400609.
- ——————— (1982). "Egypt and the General Islamic Conference of Jerusalem in 1931". Middle Eastern Studies. 18 (3): 311–322. ISSN 0026-3206.
- Rubin, Barry M. (1981). The Arab States and the Palestine Conflict. Syracuse University Press. ISBN 9780815622536.
- Quraishi, Zaheer M. (1967). Liberal Nationalism in Egypt; Rise and Fall of the Wafd Party. Jamal Printing Press. ISBN 9780861990009.
- Smith, Charles D. (1984). Islam and the Search for Social Order in Modern Egypt: A Biography of Muhammad Husayn Haykal. State University of New York Press. ISBN 9781438420400.
- Terry, Janice J. (1982). The Wafd: Cornerstone of Egyptian Political Power. Publisher: Third World Centre for Research and Publishing. ISBN 9780861990009.
