= 1929 Egyptian parliamentary election =

- 21 December 1929
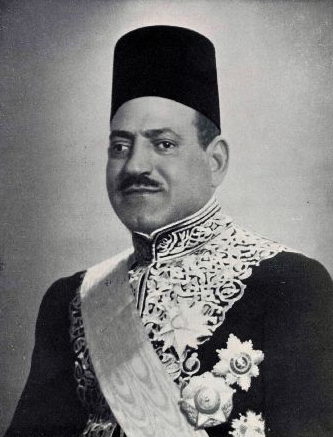

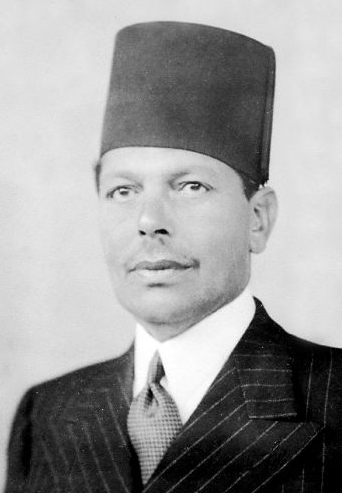
	First party	Second party
Leader	Mostafa el-Nahas	Mohammed Mahmoud
Party	Wafd	Liberal Constitutional
Seats won	216	5
Percentage	60.88%	18.85%
Prime Minister before election
Adly Yakan Pasha
Liberal Constitutional
Subsequent Prime Minister
Mostafa el-Nahas
Wafd

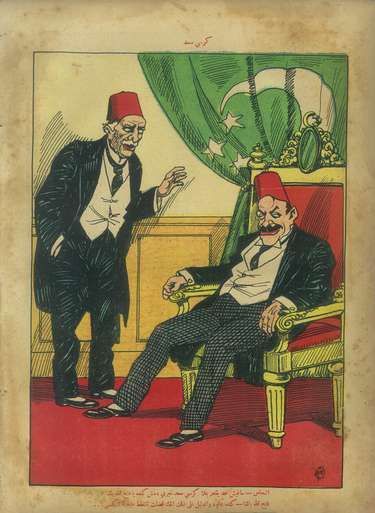
A 1928 cartoon in al Kashkul showing Mostafa el-Nahas filling in Sa'ad Zaghloul's chair after his death

Parliamentary elections were held in Egypt on 21 December 1929. The result was a victory for the Wafd Party, which won 216 of the 232 seats. (Note: Marsot (1977, p. 129) gives the Wafd 212 out of 235. Deeb (1979, p. 148) gives the Wafd 198 out of 235, with 3 seats each for the National Party and Ittihad, and the remaining went to independent candidates. Khatib's numbers are used because they are the most complete, giving both seats and raw vote totals.) The number of deputies in parliament increased from 211 to 232 after the 1927 census showed an increase in the population.

== Background ==
After the 1926 elections the alliance between the Wafd and Liberal Constitutionalists initially held. Soon, however, a political crisis emerged after a draft treaty between the British Foreign Secretary Austen Chamberlain and Egyptian Prime Minister Sarwat Pasha. The treaty was rejected by the Wafd majority parliament, leading to Sarwat's resignation and the formation of a coalition cabinet between the Wafd, led by Mostafa el-Nahas after Saad Zaghloul's death, and the Liberal Constitutionalists. Nahas' first government was short lived after it was dismissed by King Fua'd following a British ultimatum. Specifically, the British objected to an amendment in the Egyptian assembly depriving the police the right to break up public meetings and assemblies.

Following Nahas' government, Mohammed Mahmud of the Liberal Constitutional party became prime minister, forming a coalition between Liberals and Ittihadists. He later dissolved parliament and postponed elections, leading to Wafdist backlash. Mahmud entered into negotiations with the new foreign secretary Arthur Henderson, successfully signed an agreement over the Nile river in 1929. However, the British did not want to sign a final treaty without a government elected by the Egyptian people, thus forcing Mahmud to resign and call for new elections. Mahmud tried to push for elections with restricted suffrage, where only Egyptians who were literate and paid a certain amount in taxes could vote, while the Wafd pushed for full male suffrage. Ultimately, the British allowed for full male suffrage out of fear of antagonizing the Wafd and endangering the acceptance of any future treaty by the Egyptian people. Elections were held under an interim government by Adly Yakan, leading to a Wafd victory.

== Results ==
Party	Votes	%	Seats
Wafd Party	610,461	60.88	216
Liberal Constitutional Party	189,014	18.85	5
National Party	30,880	3.08	4
Ittihad Party	49,437	4.93	0
Independents	122,870	12.25	7
Total	1,002,662	100.00	232
Total votes	1,002,662	–	
Registered voters/turnout	1,566,377	64.01	
Source: Khatib

== Aftermath ==
Nahas would later be unable to secure a treaty with Britain, leading to the collapse of his second government and the emergence of what the historian Marius Deeb calls the "Palace-Sidqi Dictatorship" under the premiership of Ismail Sidky.

== Sources ==
- Deeb, Marius (1979). Party Politics in Egypt: the Wafd & its Rivals 1919–1939. Ithaca Press. ISBN 9780903729406.
- Gifford, Jayne (2021). ""The Two Ends Just Didn't Meet": the Labour Government and Anglo-Egyptian Treaty Negotiations". Britain in Egypt: Egyptian Nationalism and Imperial Strategy, 1919-1931. I.B. Tauris. ISBN 9780755636686.
- Khatib, M.F. (1954). The working of parliamentary institutions in Egypt, 1924-1952 (Thesis). University of Edinburgh.
- Marsot, Afaf Lutfi Al-Sayyid (1977). Egypt’s Liberal Experiment: 1922–1936. University of California Press. ISBN 9780520031098.
- Mahmud, Mohammed (1929). The Strong Hand in Egypt : a Brief Survey of the Policy of H.E. Mohamed Mahmoud Pasha in Egypt as Outlined in His Speeches 1928-1929. Cairo: P. Barbey's Print. OCLC 26704561.
- Quraishi, Zaheer M. (1967). "Within the Parliamentary Framework". Liberal Nationalism in Egypt; Rise and Fall of the Wafd Party. Jamal Printing Press. ISBN 9780861990009.
- Terry, Janice J. (1982). The Wafd: Cornerstone of Egyptian Political Power. Publisher: Third World Centre for Research and Publishing. ISBN 9780861990009.
