= Ali Mahmoud Taha =

Egyptian poet

‘Ali Maḥmūd Ṭāhā (Arabic: علي محمود طه) (1901–1949) was an Egyptian neo-romantic poet and member of the Cairo "Apollo Society". He has been called several nicknames, such as: The Engineer and The Lost Sailor. The Egyptian literary scholar, 'Abd al-Majid 'Abidin, published an Arabic study discussing 'Ali Mahmud Taha "al-Munhandis" (the Engineer Ali Mahmud Taha) and Iliya Abu Madi in 1967, describing them both as reformist poets (sha'irayn mujaddidayn).

Nevertheless, Taha was not as immersed in romanticism as Ibrahim Nagi and Mohammad al-Hamshari.

Furthermore, Taha's poets were politically-colored, but even provocative and patriotic, despite his death, which was before the 23rd-of-July Revolution. He was among the contributors of Al Siyasa, newspaper of the Liberal Constitutional Party.

== Early life ==
Taha was born to a family of the middle-class in Mansoura, in Delta, Egypt.

== Poems ==
- East and West
- Spirits and Ghosts
- Flower and Wine
- Passion Returned
- Nights of the Lost Sailor
- The Lost Sailor
- Birth of a Poet
- Palestine
