= Ibrahim al-Mazini =

Egyptian poet and journalist

- إبراهيم عبد القادر المازني
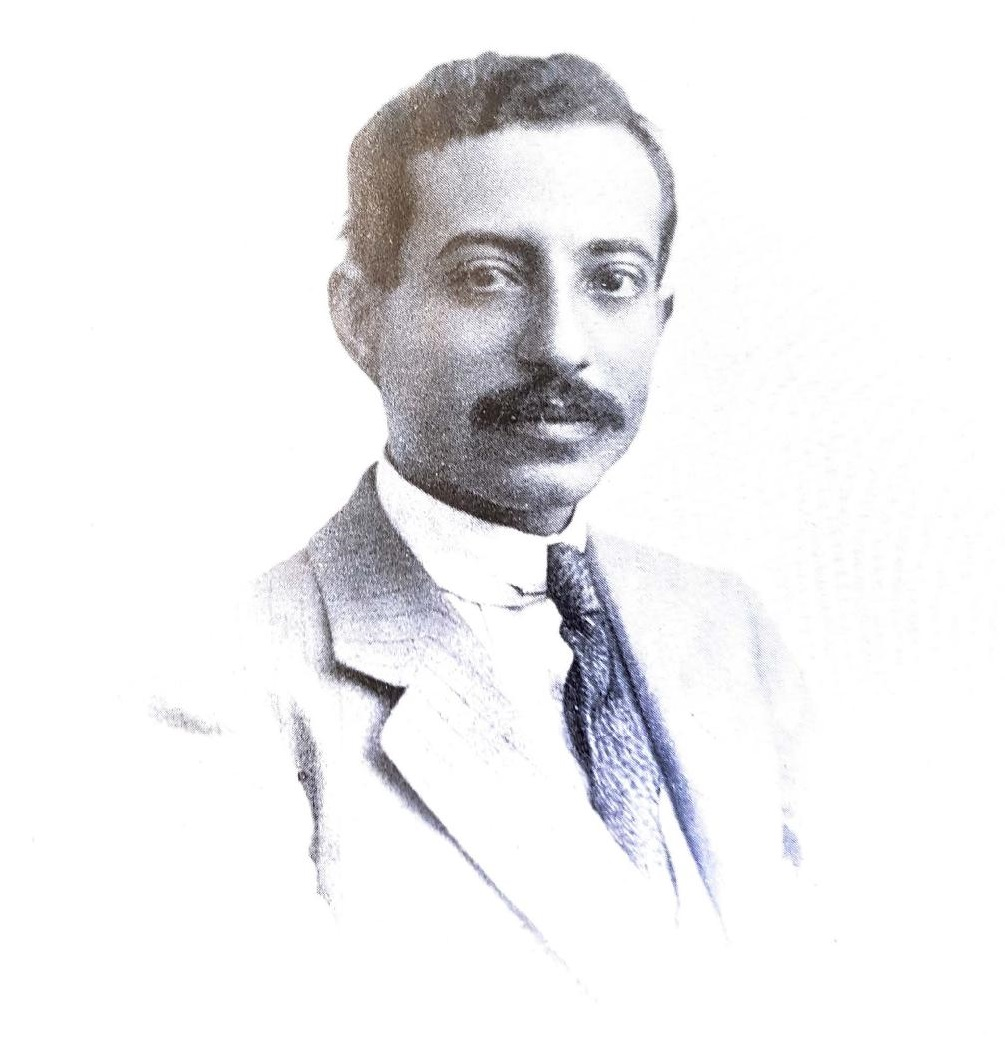
- Born: Ibrahim Abd al-Qadir al-Mazini; August 19, 1889; Cairo, Egypt
- Died: August 10, 1949 (aged 59); Cairo, Egypt
- Education: Cairo's Teacher's College
- Occupations: Poet, novelist, journalist, translator
- Writing career
- Language: Arabic
- Period: 1913–1949
- Genres: Poetry, prose, literary criticism
- Notable works: Ibrahim the Writer, al-Diwan

Ibrahim Abd al-Qadir al-Mazini (Arabic: إبراهيم عبد القادر المازني, ALA-LC: Ibrāhīm ‘Abd al-Qādir al-Māzinī; August 19, 1889 or 1890 – July 12 or August 10, 1949) was an Egyptian poet, novelist, journalist, and translator.

== Early life ==
Al-Mazini was born in Cairo, to a well-off family, but grew up in relative poverty after his father died while he was young. He registered in 1906 at Cairo's Teacher's College, despite having no great interest in teaching; he had been unable to stomach the anatomical dissections at the medical school, and the tuition at the law school was too expensive. Nonetheless, the school contributed greatly to his literary development, since in the years prior to the founding of the Egyptian University, the Teacher's College was one of the few accessible avenues for students with literary ambitions, and its students included a number who would become prominent in Egyptian literature, including Abd Al-Rahman Shukri, who became an important influence and associate of al-Mazini's. Around the same time, al-Mazini also met Abbas al-Aqqad and Muhammad al-Sibai. Al-Mazini's first literary reviews were published in publications edited by al-Aqqad, and al-Sibai introduced him to English literature and to the classical poet Ibn al-Rumi, both of which would become major influences on al-Mazini's poetry.

== Poet and critic ==
Graduating from the Teacher's College in 1909, al-Mazini taught first at the Khedivial School, and then at Dar al-Ulum, from which he resigned in 1914, after possibly having been reassigned (and assigned to teach a minor subject) due to one of his critiques offending Hishmat Pasha, the Minister of Education. From 1914 to 1918 he taught at a series of private schools, sometimes the same ones as al-Aqqad. During this period, his two collections of poetry were published, one in 1913, and one in 1917. Though influential for the Egyptian revivalist poetry of the 1910s, his poetry was accused of being too heavily based on both European and classical influences, an accusation he didn't greatly dispute; and after 1917 he published very little additional poetry.

Unsatisfied with teaching, al-Mazini became a full-time journalist in 1918, writing initially for the newspaper Wad in Alexandria, and then for a series of newspapers with varying political perspectives, generally united only in being opposed to the Wafd Party. He continued to publish literary criticism, and in 1921 co-wrote the critical work al-Diwan with al-Aqqad, which included an attack on the conservative literary establishment represented by writers such as Mustafa Lutfi el-Manfaluti and Ahmed Shawqi. Al-Mazini, al-Aqqad, and Shurki became known as the Diwan Group, which was greatly influenced by English lyric poetry, and emphasized poetry that conveyed the poet's experience and emotion, as well as avoiding social and political commentary.

== Novelist and essayist ==
Al-Mazini began writing prose in the mid-1920s, and completed his first novel, Ibrahim al-Katib (Ibrahim the Writer), in 1925–26, though it didn't receive publication until 1931. Upon its publication, it was considered a landmark in Egyptian literature, "probably the first novel to depend primarily for its well-recognized fame on its artistic value", rather than for its social, political, or historical views, as was common in Egyptian literature of the time. He was among the contributors of Al Siyasa, newspaper of the Liberal Constitutional Party.

Despite the novel's positive reception, al-Mazini forsook novel-writing for political and narrative essay-writing from 1931 to 1943; some of his writings from this period were published in two collections, Khuyut al-Ankabut (Spider Webs, 1935) and Fi al-tariq (On the Road, 1937). He also during that time helped found the Egyptian Journalists Syndicate in 1941, and served as its first vice-president. The break in his novel-writing career may have been related to a plagiarism controversy, as Ibrahim al-Katib contained several pages from a Russian novel al-Mazini had previously translated.

In 1943, he published a sequel to Ibrahim al-Katib, entitled Ibrahim al-thani (Ibrahim the Second), as well as three additional novels in quick succession.

Late in life, he was elected to both the Arab Academy of Damascus and Academy of the Arabic Language in Cairo.
