= 1936 Egyptian parliamentary election =

- May 1936
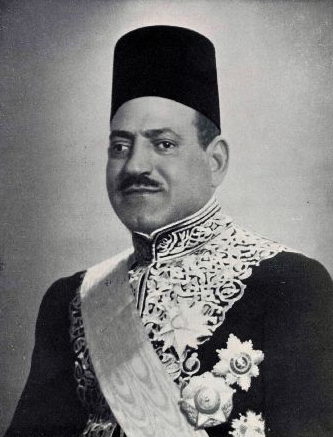

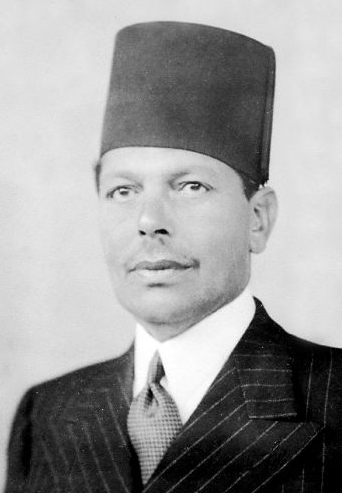

	First party	Second party
Leader	Mostafa el-Nahas	Mohamed Mahmoud
Party	Wafd	Liberal Constitutional
Seats won	190	15
	Third party	Fourth party
Leader		Hafiz Ramadan Bey
Party	Popular Unionist	National
Seats won	14	4
Prime Minister before election
Aly Maher Pasha
Ittihad Party
Subsequent Prime Minister
Mostafa el-Nahas
Wafd Party

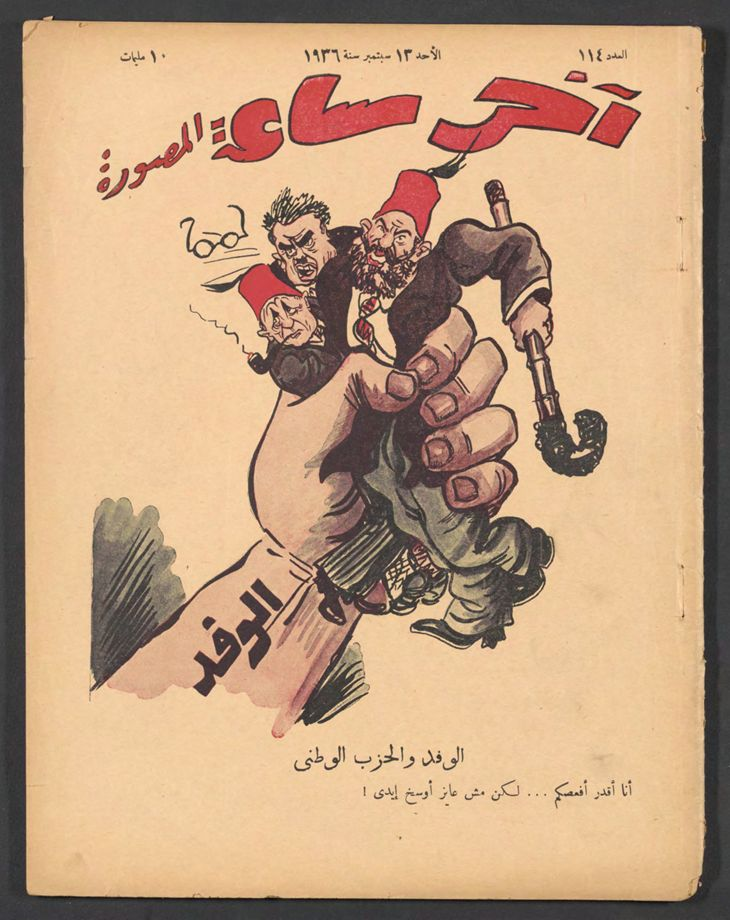
Cartoon by Akher Saa showing the Wafd crushing their opponents after the 1936 election: "I can crush you... but I don't want to get my hands dirty!"

Parliamentary elections were held in Egypt in May 1936; elections for the Chamber of Deputies took place on 2 May and for the Senate on 7 May. The elections were held following the death of King Fuad I, and his son Farouk's ascension to the throne. The result was a victory for the Wafd Party, which won 190 of the 232 seats. King Farouk's coronation was held in the newly elected parliament on 29 July 1937.

== Background ==
The 1923 constitution was restored on 12 December 1935, allowing for the first free elections since 1929. The elections were held under Ali Maher's caretaker government with direct elections and universal adult male suffrage.

== Results ==
Different sources give different results for the elections; Dolf Sternberger et al. and Marius Deeb state that the Wafd won 179 of the 232 seats in the Chamber of Deputies, with Deeb also giving the Wafd 65 of the 79 seats in the Senate. David Moore puts the number of Wafdist seats at 166 in the Chamber and 62 in the senate, while M.F. El-Khatib states that the Wafd won 190 seats in the Chamber, though notes 45 of the Wafd candidates were 'not official candidates of the party'.

=== Chamber of Deputies ===
Party	Votes	%	Seats
Wafd Party	794,966	62.05	190
Popular Unionist Party	174,535	13.62	14
Liberal Constitutional Party	157,454	12.29	15
National Party	20,275	1.58	4
Independents	133,855	10.45	9
Total	1,281,085	100.00	232
Total votes	1,261,330	–	
Registered voters/turnout	2,120,477	59.48	
Source: Khatib
