= Ahmed Naguib el-Hilaly =

Prime Minister of Egypt (1952)

- حسين سري باشا
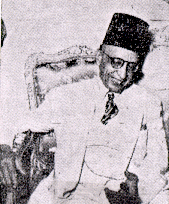

29th Prime Minister of Egypt
- In office 22 July 1952 – 23 July 1952
- Monarch: Farouk I
- Preceded by: Hussein Sirri Pasha
- Succeeded by: Aly Maher Pasha
- In office 2 March 1952 – 2 July 1952
- Monarch: Farouk I
- Preceded by: Aly Maher Pasha
- Succeeded by: Hussein Sirri Pasha

Personal details
- Born: 1 October 1891 Asyut, Khedivate of Egypt
- Died: 11 December 1958 (aged 67) Maadi, Republic of Egypt

Ahmed Naguib el-Hilaly (أحمد نجيب الهلالي) (1 October 1891 – 11 December 1958) was an Egyptian lawyer and educator who served as Prime Minister of Egypt twice in 1952.

== Life and career ==
Born in Asyut to a wealthy family, el-Hilaly was educated at the Tawfiqiyya School He was interested in studying medicine but was advised by his father to study at the Khedival Law School and began his law career in the Niyaba after graduating in 1912, later opening a law office. In the Niyaba, we worked in the royal cases section, becoming a chancellor in 1931. He was appointed as a professor in 1923 to the law school, rising to secretary-general of the Ministry of Public Instruction next year. He became a royal advisor on education and served as education minister under Muhammad Tawfiq Nasim Pasha from November 1934 to January 1936. He joined the Wafd Party in 1938 and served in the cabinet of Wafd party leader Mustafa al-Nahhas in 1937 to 1938 and in his second cabinet from 1942 to 1944. His publications on education reform paved the way for reforms, including free universal public education in Egypt, day care, earlier entrance to school and longer compulsory education. The University of Alexandria, then called Faruq university, opened while he was education minister.

Though the Wafd won the 1950 elections, el-Hilaly was not a member of the new cabinet nor did he run for parliament. Instead, he remained as a member of the Wafd executive committee and instead successfully endorsing four men for cabinet positions, including Taha Hussein as education minister. However, the failure of his proteges to exert influence over the Wafd and the party's subservience to the King caused him to be despondent, missing executive committee meetings in the late up to the abrogation on the 1936 Anglo-Egyptian treaty. The party ousted him in November 1951. The Wafd government was dismissed following the 1952 Battle of Ismailia and subsequent Cairo Fire. Though offered the position of prime minister on 27 January, he turn it down.

He became prime minister following Ali Maher's dismissal. His government had a profound anti-Wafd bias, as many ministers in his government had a grudge against the party. He adjourned parliament his second day in office, declaring his goal to be 'purification before liberation' as well as abolishing government privileges. After his first week in office, his government released a report accusing ex-interior minister Fouad Serageddin of inciting a mob to riot in the Cairo fire. On March 21 1952, his government charged Serageddin and Abd al-Fattah Hasan - the former Wafdist minister of social affairs - with conspiring to disturb the peace. On March 24, he dissolved parliament, setting up new elections on May 18 with the new chamber to sit on May 31. The next day the government permanently enshrined martial law, which was set to expire on March 26. On the last day of March, he demoted thousands of Wafdists. On April 12, he postponed elections indefinitely. Negotiations with Britiain stalled as the British government felt uncomfortable negotiating with an unstable government. However, mounting criticism from Wafdists and non-Wafdists, such as Ali Maher, Hussein Sirri and Hafiz Ramadan, as well as his plan of a reform or purge of the king's coterie - threatening to the palace, lead to his resignation on 29 June. Following Sirri's government - which lasted until his resignation on July 20 - he was appointed prime minister once again. Though forced to appoint the king's brother in law as war minister, he was secured a promise to purge the king's inner circle. His cabinet took the oath of office in Alexandria on July 22 at 4:00 pm. The next day, members of the Free Officers overthrew the government in Cairo. It was the shortest government in Egypt's constitutional era.

After the 1952 Egyptian revolution, he resigned his post. He was briefly imprisoned in September 1952 by the Revolutionary Command Council, then freed and allowed to return to practice law. Following his wife's death in 1958, he did in Maadi before his rights could be restored.

Political offices
Preceded by Aly Maher Pasha	Prime Minister of Egypt; 1952	Succeeded by Hussein Serry Pasha
