= Al Siyasa =

Newspaper of the Liberal Constitution Party in Egypt (1922–1951)

- Owner: Liberal Constitutional Party
- Founders: Mohammed Hussein Heikal; Mahmoud Abdul Raziq
- Editor-in-chief: Mohammed Hussein Heikal
- Founded: October 1922
- Ceased publication: 1951
- Language: Arabic
- Headquarters: Cairo
- Country: Egypt

Al Siyasa (Arabic: Politics) was an Egyptian newspaper which was the official media outlet of the now-defunct Liberal Constitutional Party. The paper was in circulation from 1922 to 1951.

== History and profile ==
Al Siyasa was launched in 1922 shortly after the establishment of the Liberal Constitutional Party. The first issue appeared in October that year. The founders were Mohammed Hussein Heikal and Mahmoud Abdul Raziq. The former also edited Al Siyasa. Major contributors included Taha Hussein, Salama Moussa, Ali Mahmoud Taha, Ibrahim Nagi, Ibrahim Al Mazini and Mustafa Abdul Raziq.

Following its start Al Siyasa supported religious freedom and secular thought. During the 1920s the paper was particularly influential and the primary supporter of the reforms introduced in Turkey following the establishment of the new republican system. At the same time it advocated Egyptian nationalism through the articles of Mohammed Hussein Heikal, which supported close economic and cultural relationships between Egypt and the countries of the Arab East.

Al Siyasa was one of the four publications read by Egyptian women partly due to the fact that it featured a weekly women's page entitled Sahifat al Sayyida. The page was started on 17 November 1922. The other Cairo-based newspapers which also featured similar pages were Le Réveil, La Patrie and L'Information.

However, the political stance of Al Siyasa explicitly changed, and it became a fierce critic of the foreign influence in Egypt. In addition, the paper began to appeal to the beliefs of Muslims in the 1930s and claimed that the missionaries in the country were criminals. It also attacked the Copts in the country.

The major rival of Al Siyasa was Al Balagh, and the rivalry between them continued until 1951. Both papers launched a weekly edition in 1926. That of Al Siyasa was entitled Al Siyasa Al Usbuʿiyya which was started in March that year and existed until 1930. Al Siyasa ceased publication in 1951.
