= Abdel Rahman Shokry =

Egyptian poet

Abdel Rahman Shokry (Arabic: عبد الرحمن شكري; 12 October 1886 – 16 December 1958) was an Egyptian poet from the Diwan school of poets.

== Early life ==
He was born in Port Said and he travelled to England where he got his Bachelor of Arts from the University of Sheffield.

== Career ==
He believed that poetry must be renewed and freed from the one-rhyme system in Arabic poetry. There were seven poetry books for him, including "Light of The Dawn" in 1909 and "Flower of The Spring" in 1916.

He abandoned poetry after a dispute with his two colleagues in this school, Ibrahim Al-Mazini and Abbas el-Akkad, until his death.

== External links (Arabic) ==
- https://web.archive.org/web/20060823130335/http://www.albabtainpoeticprize.org/poetDetails.aspx?ptId=361
