= 1942 Egyptian parliamentary election =

- 24 March 1942
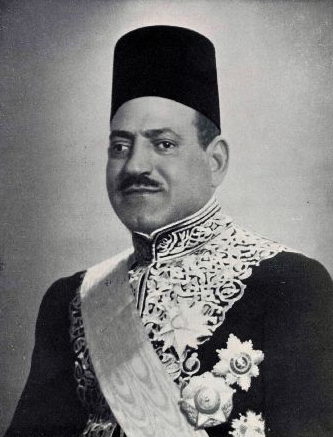
	First party	Second party
Leader	Mostafa el-Nahas	Hafiz Ramadan Bey
Party	Wafd	National
Seats won	232	5
Prime Minister before election
Mostafa el-Nahas
Wafd
Subsequent Prime Minister
Mostafa el-Nahas
Wafd

Parliamentary elections were held in Egypt on 24 March 1942. They were boycotted by the opposition due to Abdeen Palace incident, resulting in the ruling Wafd Party winning 232 of the 264 seats, the Wafd's largest victory in terms of seat totals.

== Background ==
Hassan al-Banna and the Muslim Brotherhood agreed not to contest these elections following a deal with the Wafd Party that meant in exchange for not contesting the elections, the Wafd Party would ease restrictions on the Muslim Brotherhood and enact moral reforms.

== Results ==
Dolf Sternberger et al put the Wafd victory at 240 seats, with 4 seats for the Liberal Constitutional Party, 2 for the National Party, 1 seat for the Saadist Institutional Party and 17 for independents. David F. Moore (1965) puts the Wafdist victory at 233 seats, with an opposition of 14 independents, 4 Liberal Constitutionalists, 2 Saadists and 2 Nationalists. The Wafd captured 81 seats in the Egyptian senate against 37 independents, 11 Liberal Constitutionalists and 10 Saadists. Another source around the time notes that 110 of the 264 constituencies had no contest, of which 105 were won by Wafdist candidates. The opposition was composed of 12 independents, 4 Liberal Constitutionalists, 2 Nationalists and 1 Saadist.

Party	Votes	%	Seats
Wafd Party	738,675	58.30	232
National Party	18,687	1.47	5
Others (Note: While the Saadist Institutional Party and the Liberal Constitutional Party boycotted the elections, some members still participated.)	233,590	18.44	13
Independents	276,070	21.79	14
Total	1,267,022	100.00	264
Total votes	1,271,496	–	
Registered voters/turnout	2,234,647	56.90	
Source: Khatib

== Aftermath ==
Parliament sat on 30 March that year and was dissolved on 15 November 1944.

== Sources ==
- Euben, Roxanne Leslie; Zaman, Muhammad Qasim, eds. (2009). Princeton readings in Islamist thought: texts and contexts from al-Banna to Bin Laden. Princeton studies in Muslim politics. Princeton: Princeton University Press. ISBN 978-0-691-13588-5.
- Khatib, M.F. (1954). The working of parliamentary institutions in Egypt, 1924-1952 (Thesis). University of Edinburgh.
- Moore, David F. (1965). The Wafd Party of Egypt: 1936–1945 (Thesis). American University of Beirut. ProQuest 2316005707.
- Quraishi, Zaheer M. (1967). Liberal Nationalism in Egypt; Rise and Fall of the Wafd Party. Jamal Printing Press. ISBN 9780861990009.
- Sternberger, Dolf; Vogel, Bernhard; Nohlen, Dieter; Landfried, Klaus, eds. (1978). Die Wahl Der Parlamente Und Anderer Staatsorgane: Ein Handbuch (in German). Walter de Gruyter GmbH.
