= 1931 Egyptian parliamentary election =

- 1 June 1931
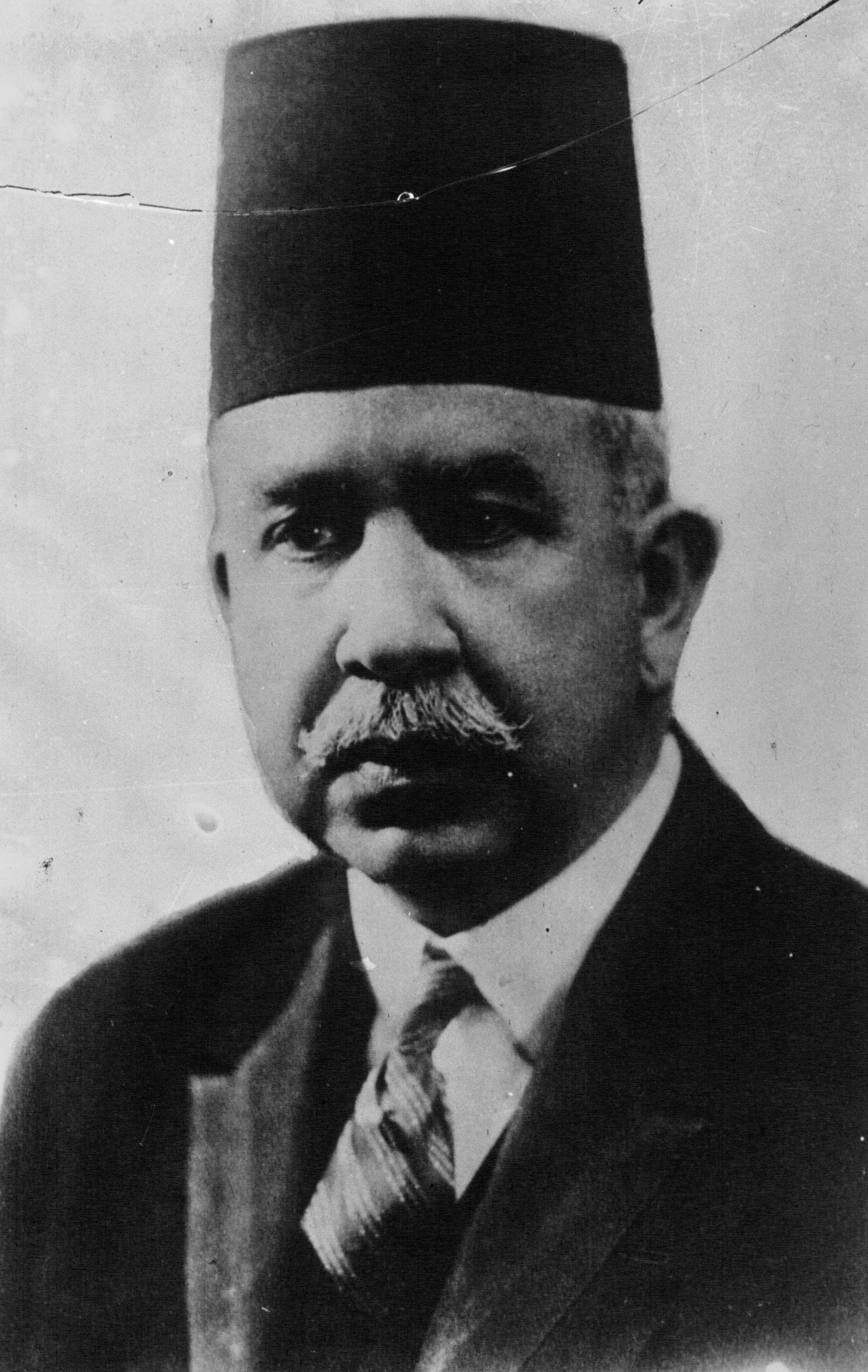

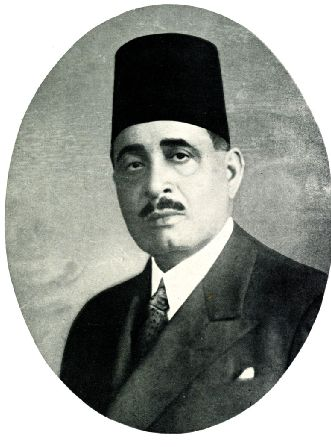
	First party	Second party
Leader	Ismail Sidky	Mohamed Tawfik Naseem Pasha
Party	People's Party	Ittihad
Seats won	84	40
Percentage	58.01%	23.75%
Prime Minister before election
Ismail Sidky
People's Party
Subsequent Prime Minister
Ismail Sidky
People's Party

Parliamentary elections were held in Egypt on 1 June 1931. They were the only elections held under the 1930 constitution, a more autocratic constitution that had replaced the 1923 constitution. The elections were boycotted by the Liberal Constitutional Party and the Wafd Party. Although they resulted in a victory for Ismail Sidky's newly formed People's Party, a political crisis led to the restoration of the 1923 constitution in 1935 and the Wafd's victory in the 1936 elections.

== Background ==
After the resignation of Mostafa el-Nahas' Wafd government in 1930, King Fuad appointed Ismail Sidky prime minister on 20 June 1930. His first act was to prorogue parliament for a month. In response, the Wafd Party held a national congress to defend the constitution and adopt a policy of non-cooperation with the government by refusing the pay taxes until parliament was restored. While the Liberal Constitutionalists had issues with the parliament, they were also against drawing up a new constitution and ultimately withdrew their support from the government when Sidky promulgated a new constitution on 22 October. The new document increased the powers of the king, including increasing the number of senators appointed by the monarch from two-fifths to three-fifths of the Senate.

== Electoral system ==
A new electoral law was adopted that made parliamentary elections indirect; fifty voters elected an elector, who then voted for candidates. The first stage elections were held in May on the 14th, 16th, and 18th for the electors who then voted in the second stage on 1 June. The voting age was increased from 21 to 25, while property and educational requirements for electors were increased. The Chamber of Deputies was reduced from 232 to 150 members. The most egregious part of the law was the ban on 'liberal' workers outside of Cairo from running. Doctors, lawyers, engineers, merchants and journalists – professions typically associated with Wafdist and Liberal Constitutionalists supporters – in the countryside were barred from running, while conservative government-appointed village elites and sheikhs could run. As a result, the Wafd and Liberal Constitutionalists agreed to boycott the elections, signing a joint pact on 31 March calling for a return of the 1923 system.

== Results ==
The elections that took place were marked with violence and corruption. During a clash with police on 14 May the Red Crescent reported 262 wounded and 40 killed. In some cases, people voted multiple times. Qena had a 97 turnout, Jirja 98 percent, and the province of Aswan had a turnout of 105 percent. As one American Mission doctor in Faiyum put it, the elections were "an absolute farce in all particulars... whole villages were simply deserted lest they be gathered in by force and required to vote... and that cooking the lists was done in practically every booth." The Political Handbook and Atlas of the World gives the seat results in the Chamber of Deputies as 84 for the People's Party, 39 Ittihadists, 8 Nationalists, 16 independents and 3 vacant. In the senate elections on 11 June 1931, the results were 35 for the People's Party, 25 Ittihadists, 1 Nationalist, 37 independents, and one vacant seat. The Royal Institute of International Affairs gives similar figures: 83 People's Party seats, 38 Ittihadists, 17 independents and 8 Nationalists.

Party	Votes	%	Seats
People's Party	25,286	58.01	84
Ittihad Party	10,351	23.75	40
National Party	1,904	4.37	8
Other parties (Note: Despite the boycott, one Wafdist and three Liberal Constitutionalists participated in the election)	277	0.64	0
Independents	5,768	13.23	18
Total	43,586	100.00	150
Total votes	43,706	–	
Registered voters/turnout	45,794	95.44	
Source: Khatib

== Aftermath ==
Parliament sat on 20 June 1931 and was dissolved on 30 November 1934.

== Sources ==
- Deeb, Marius (1979). Party Politics in Egypt: the Wafd & its Rivals 1919–1939. Ithaca Press. ISBN 9780903729406.
- Habib, Henry P. (1964). A Case Study in Egyptian Conservatism: Ismail Sidky (Thesis). McGill University.
- Khatib, M.F (1954). The working of parliamentary institutions in Egypt, 1924-1952 (Thesis). University of Edinburgh.
- Marsot, Afaf Lutfi Al-Sayyid (1977). Egypt’s Liberal Experiment: 1922–1936. University of California Press. ISBN 9780520031098.
- Quraishi, Zaheer M. (1967). Liberal Nationalism in Egypt; Rise and Fall of the Wafd Party. Jamal Printing Press. ISBN 9780861990009.
- Terry, Janice J. (1982). The Wafd: Cornerstone of Egyptian Political Power. Third World Centre for Research and Publishing. ISBN 9780861990009.
