= Ismail Sidky =

Prime Minister of Egypt (1930–1933, 1946)

- إسماعيل صدقي
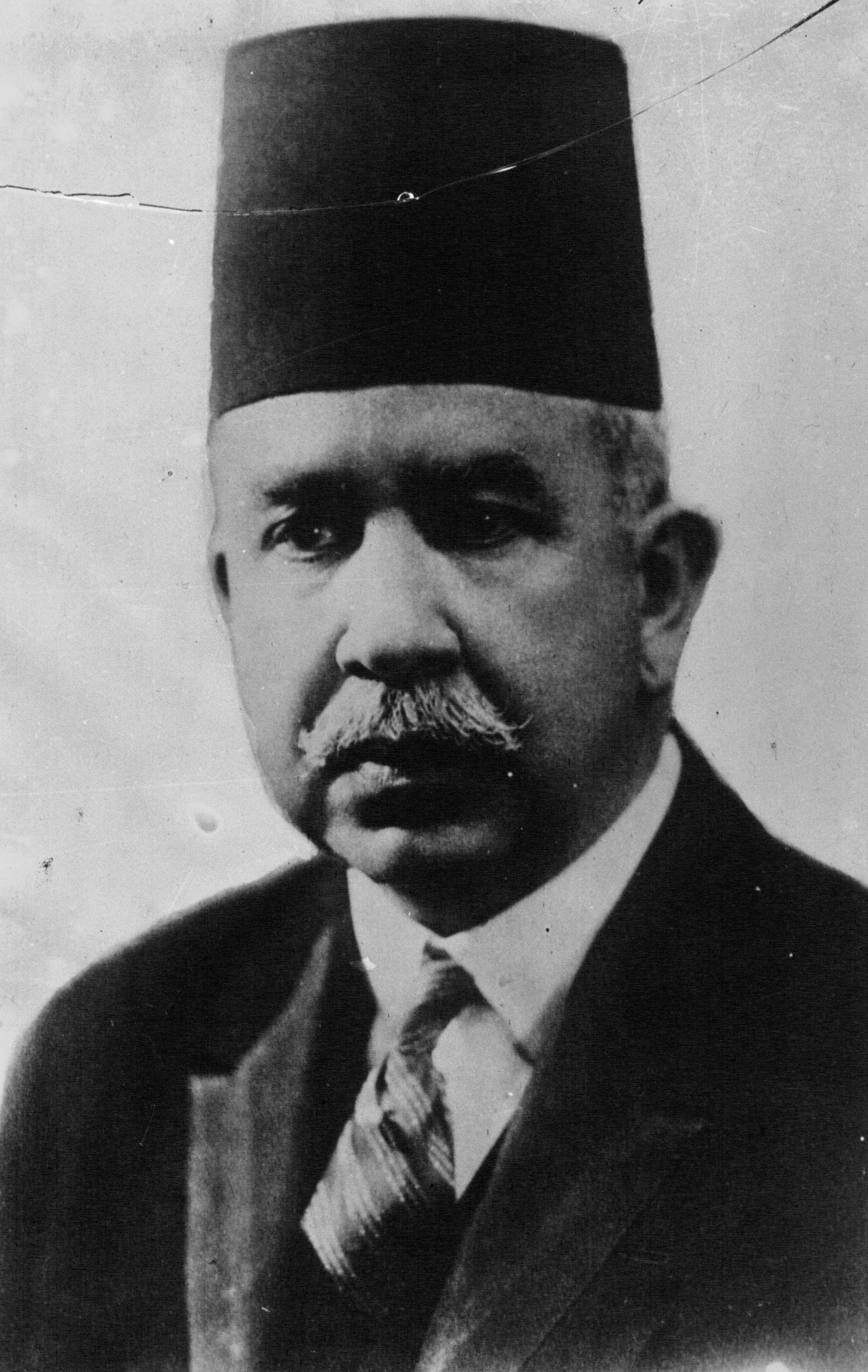
- Sidky in 1932

21st Prime Minister of Egypt
- In office 17 February 1946 – 9 December 1946
- Monarch: King Farouk
- Preceded by: Mahmoud El Nokrashy Pasha
- Succeeded by: Mahmoud El Nokrashy Pasha
- In office 20 June 1930 – 22 September 1933
- Monarch: King Fuad
- Preceded by: Mostafa El-Nahas
- Succeeded by: Abdel Fattah Yahya Pasha

Personal details
- Born: 15 June 1875 Alexandria, Khedivate of Egypt
- Died: 9 July 1950 (aged 75)
- Party: Wafd Party

Ismail Sidky Pasha (Arabic: إسماعيل صدقي; (Note: His last name is sometimes spelt "Sidqi") 15 June 1875 – 9 July 1950) was an Egyptian politician who served as Prime Minister of Egypt from 1930 to 1933 and again in 1946.

== Life and career ==
He was born in Alexandria and was originally named Isma'il Saddiq but his name was changed after his namesake fell out of favor. Sidky graduated from Collège des Frères in Cairo and the Khedival Law School; his classmates at law school include Egyptian intellectual Ahmad Lufti al-Sayyid, future prime ministers Tawfik Nessim and Abdel Khalek Sarwat Pasha, and the Egyptian nationalist Mustafa Kamil. At school, he contributed article for the school newspaper, run by Kamil, and for al-Sayyid's paper al-Sharai'i'. He then joined the public prosecutor's office, quickly rising through the ranks. In 1899 he became administrative secretary of the Alexandria municipal commission, serving until 1914, when he was appointed Minister of Agriculture and later Minister of Waqfs (Islamic endowments). When World War I began, Sidky was in Vichy while Khedive Abbas was deposed for his uncle Hussein Kamil, creating the Sultanate of Egypt as a British Protectorate. He later resigned from government following a scandal with the married daughter of another cabinet minister, though he remained an influential politician.

After the war, Sidky joined the Wafd – a delegation of Egyptian nationalists arguing for Egyptian independence at the Treaty of Versailles, such as Saad Zaghloul, Mohammed Mahmoud, and al-Sayyid. However, the Wafd was denied an opportunity to speak in Paris, instead Sidky was deported to Malta with party founder Saad Zaghloul and other loyalists in March 1919, thus igniting the 1919 Egyptian revolution. The public outcry forced Britain to allow the Wafdist leaders to make their case in Paris, followed and censured by British authorities. Sidky was disillusioned by the Wafd's plan in Paris, believing that foreign recognition would not come, instead arguing to return to continue the struggle in Egypt, especially to fight the Milner Mission. This break later led Zaghoul to expel Sidky from the party. Sidky would join the moderate faction of Sarwat Pasha, opposed to the 'radicalism' of Zaghloul and the Wafdists.

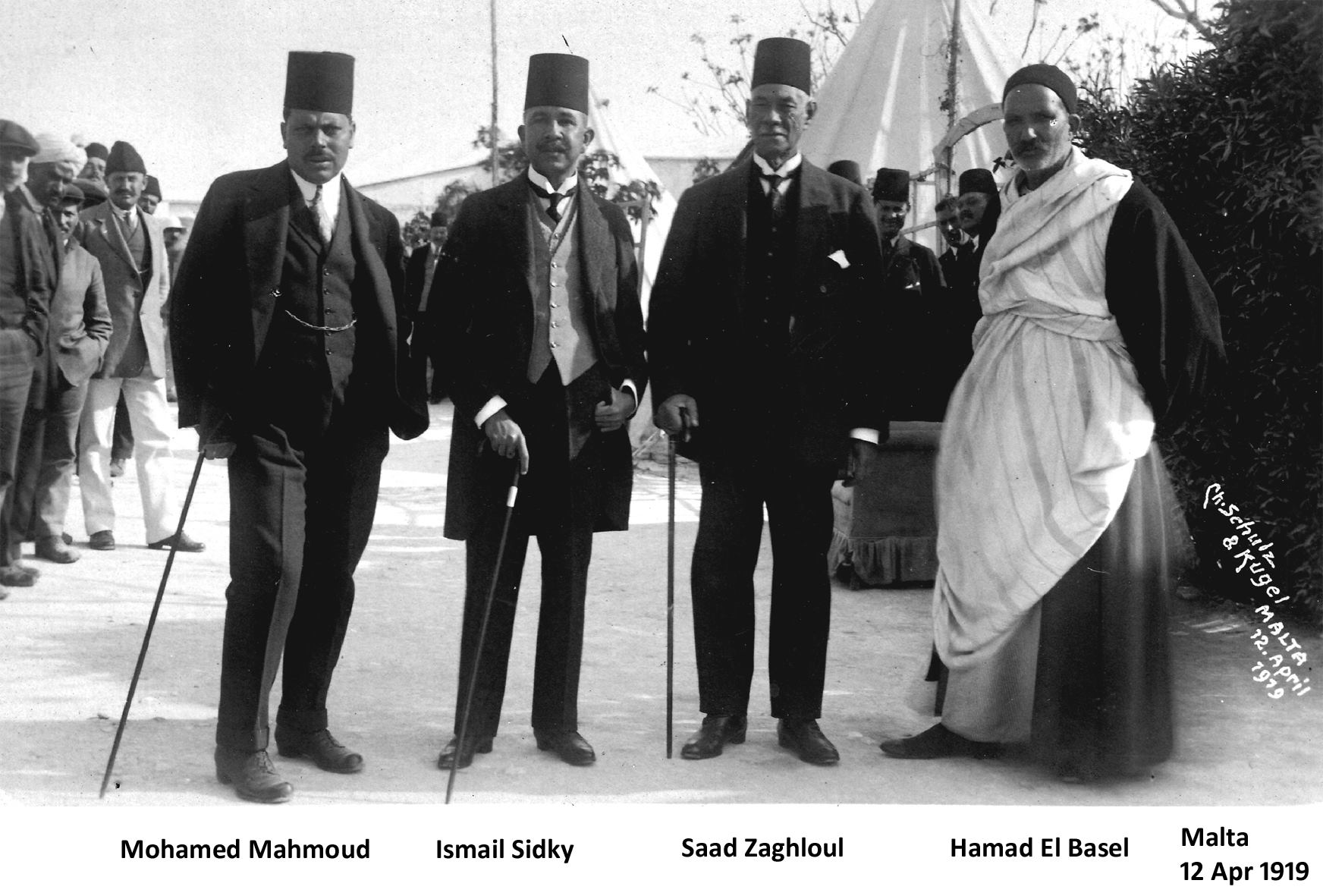
Egyptian nationalist in Malta. From left to right: Mohamed Mahmoud, Isma'il Sidqi, Saad Zaghloul, Hamad el-Basel

The Milner Mission arrived in Egypt on 7 December 1919, attempting to dampen local ambitions and protect Britain's interests, leading to a mass boycott by local Egyptians. High Commissioner of Egypt Edmund Allenby, Sarwat and Sidky held negotiations between the Egyptians and British regarding the specifics of Britain's role in Egyptian affairs; chiefly the end of the Protectorate, the re-establishment of the Ministry of Foreign Affairs, a bicameral parliament, and a reduction of foreign influence to an advisory position. These negotiations between nationalist factions and the British dragged on throughout the backdrop of public protests and riots, eventually culminating in the Unilateral Declaration of Egyptian Independence in 1922. Sidky later became minister of finance, the Sultanate of Egypt would become a kingdom, and a new constitution was signed the next year.

Sidki, due to his rivalry with Zaghoul, would lose his post after the Wafd's victory in the 1923 elections, though he would rejoin the government as the minister of the interior after Zaghoul's resignation following the assassination of Sir Lee Stack. Sidky feared Zaghloul's return, since a Wafdist parliament would be at odds with the king, thus created more riots and instability that the British can exploit and argue that Egypt was not 'ready to govern itself'. Sidky favored a two-stage election system, where voters in groups of thirty would elect a representative who would then vote for the district's MP. In spite of Sidky's plans, in the 1925 elections, the Wafd received 46% of the vote (over 53% of the seats), the Liberal Constitutionalists (Sidky's party) received 20% and the Ittihad – the conservative party – received only 17%. After Zaghloul was elected speaker of the Chamber of Deputies, parliament was dissolved later that day. After the crisis, Zaghloul died of health problems; Mostafa al-Nahhas would be his successor. Sidky, around this time, negotiated a deal with Italy's Benito Mussolini over the Egyptian-Libyan border, where Egypt would get Sallum and Italian Libya would keep the Al Jaghbub Oasis it received in the Treaty of London.

Sidky was appointed prime minister on 20 June 1930, holding the position of Minister of the Interior and Finance. His first act was to postpone parliament for a month, leading to a fight between Sidqi and the Wafd. On the 23rd, Wafdists MPs forced themselves into parliament by breaking the lock of the door, but were prevented from entering the building. The Wafd's National Congress later voted to not cooperate with the government. After a month, the king issued another decree dissolving parliament, with Sidky arguing that the constitution gave the king the right to dissolve parliament at will. Bloody riots swept the country, as troops fired on protesting civilians, killing two dozen people by 15 July. A new constitution was announced on 23 October:

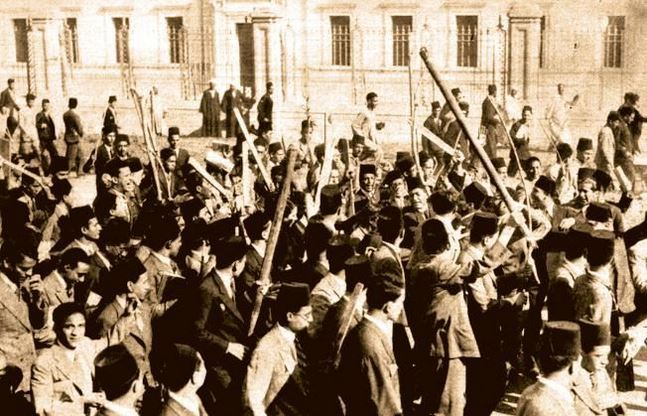
Protesters demanding the retraction of the Constitution of 1930

- reduced the number of deputies from 235 to 150
- increased the number of monarch appointed senators from 2/5 to 3/5,
- increased the voting age from 21 to 25
- established financial and educational conditions for second round voters
- reduced parliamentary sessions from six months to five
- made all religious appointments the king's responsibility.

Another decree was passed, making it impossible for a minister appointed by the king to be dismissed without consent from the king, essentially making the king's ministers untouchable by parliament. While his critics denounced Sidqi as a dictator, Sidqi saw the constitution as a defense against dictatorship, saying:

"Dictatorship is a dangerous weapon that should only be resorted to in particular cases and then only for a limited period... The new Constitution (on account of its greater compatibility) prevents the excesses that are likely to lead to dictatorship."

Sidqi believed that the Wafd, and the Egyptian people at large, was not responsible enough to wield power themselves, that only through a responsible government of elites could govern Egypt and negotiate independence. Disagreements over the constitution led Mahmoud's Liberals to ally themselves with al-Nahhas' Wafd, while Sidky formed his own party – the Sha'b, or People's Party, and allied with the conservative pro-monarch Ittihadists. The Wafd-Liberal coalition boycotted the elections, and encouraged its supported to avoid paying taxes to the new government, leading to Sidky's victory in the 1931 elections.

During his first tenure as prime minister, Sidky pressed for the enactment of mortgage lending reforms aimed at restructuring the relationship of foreign lenders such as Crédit Foncier Egyptienne, the Mortgage Company of Egypt, and The Land Bank of Egypt with qualifying Egyptian mortgage debtors. On 3 February 1933 the Legislative Assembly of the Mixed Court of Appeals approved a law decreed by King Fuad and signed by the king, Sidki, and Egyptian Minister of Justice Ahmed Ali relative to properties in process of foreclosure with the Mixed Court System, known as Law 7 of 1933. Having begun the process of mortgage loan reforms in 1933, subsequent governments followed essentially the same practices, all in the context of foreclosure pressures experienced during the global economic depression of the 1930s, e.g., decret-loi no. 72 de 1935, and Law 47 of 1936, and Law 48 of 1936, each of which may be viewed in light of the negotiations leading to the Anglo-Egyptian Treaty of 1936.

After a stroke and a crisis with Minister of Justice Ali Maher, Sidky agreed to resign. However, the opposition continued to fight the palace regime until 1935, when the 1923 constitution was finally reinstated. In 1938 Sidky retired from politics again. He returned to politics one last time in February 1946 as prime minister, seeking to revise the Anglo-Egyptian Treaty. While he signed a draft agreement with Ernest Bevin, negotiations later failed over disagreements on the status of Sudan. After failing to unite Egypt and Sudan under Egyptian sovereignty, Sidky resigned from the office on 8 December 1946. He was succeeded by Mahmoud el Nokrashy Pasha.

== Notes ==
Political offices
Preceded by Mostafa el-Nahhas Pasha	Prime Minister of Egypt; 1930–1933	Succeeded by Abdel Fattah Yahya Pasha
Preceded by Mahmoud en-Nokrashy Pasha	Prime Minister of Egypt; 1946	Succeeded by Mahmoud en-Nokrashy Pasha
