= Hussein Sirri Pasha =

Prime Minister of Egypt (1940–1942, 1949–1950, 1952)

- حسين سري باشا
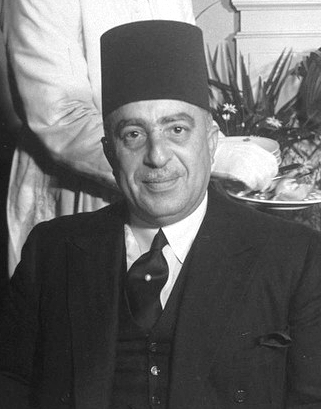

25th Prime Minister of Egypt
- In office November 15, 1940 – February 4, 1942
- Monarch: Farouk I
- Preceded by: Hassan Sabry Pasha
- Succeeded by: Mustafa el-Nahhas Pasha
- In office July 25, 1949 – January 12, 1950
- Monarch: Farouk I
- Preceded by: Ibrahim Abdel Hadi Pasha
- Succeeded by: Mustafa el-Nahhas Pasha
- In office July 2, 1952 – July 22, 1952
- Monarch: Farouk I
- Preceded by: Ahmad Naguib Hilali Pasha
- Succeeded by: Ahmad Naguib Hilali Pasha

Personal details
- Born: 1894 Khedivate of Egypt
- Died: 1960 (aged 65–66)
- Parent: Ismail Sirri Pasha (father)

Hussein Sirri Pasha (Arabic: حسين سري باشا; 1894–1960) was an Egyptian politician. He served as 25th Prime Minister of Egypt for three short periods, during which he also served as foreign minister.

== Early life and education ==
Hussein Sirri was the son of Ismail Sirri Pasha (1861–1937). He received a degree in civil engineering in Paris.

== Career ==
Sirri Pasha began his career as an engineer at the Ministry of Public Works, and was appointed minister to the same body in 1937. He was minister of finance from 1939 to 1940. Sirri Pasha first served as prime minister from 1940 until 1942, the height of the Axis and Allied confrontation in Egypt's Western Desert in the Second World War, which concluded with the Second Battle of El Alamein. His cabinet was announced on 18 November 1940, and he formed it without having any affiliation with the political parties.

In February 1941, the Prime Minister of Australia, Robert Menzies, visited Cairo and met with Sirri. Writing in 1967, he said "We found that political problems are the same the wide world over, and laughed about them." He then wrote that "The great pity was that so good a Prime Minister had to serve under so poor a King. Sirri Pasha was... a good administrator, and completely honest."

Sirri next served as prime minister from July 1949 until January 1950. His final term was for three weeks in July 1952, amidst a political crisis which culminated in the Egyptian Revolution of 1952, and the abdication of King Farouk.

== Personal life ==
Sirri Pasha was married to the aunt of Queen Farida, spouse of King Farouk.

Political offices
Preceded by Hassan Sabry Pasha	Prime Minister of Egypt; 1940–1942	Succeeded by Mustafa el-Nahhas Pasha
Preceded by Ibrahim Abdel Hadi Pasha	Prime Minister of Egypt; 1949–1950	Succeeded by Mustafa el-Nahhas Pasha
Preceded by Ahmad Naguib Hilali Pasha	Prime Minister of Egypt; 1952	Succeeded by Ahmad Naguib Hilali Pasha
