= Al Kashkul =

Political satire magazine in Egypt (1914–1934)

- Categories: Political magazine; Satirical magazine
- Frequency: Weekly
- Founder: Sulayman Fawzi
- Founded: 1914
- Final issue: 1934
- Country: Egypt
- Based in: Cairo
- Language: Arabic

Al Kashkul (Arabic: الكشكول, lit. 'The Notebook or The Scrapbook') was a weekly political satire magazine in Cairo, Egypt. It was in circulation for twenty years between 1914 and 1934. Both Al Kashkul and its rival Rose Al Yusuf played an important role in the establishment of cartoon-based political journalism in the country.

== History and profile ==
Al Kashkul was established in 1914 by Sulayman Fawzi and was renamed as Al Kashkul Al Musawwar (Arabic: The Illustrated Notebook) in 1921. Al Kashkul was published on a weekly basis in Cairo. It supported the independence of Egypt from the British rule and was in fact started to support the anti-British policies of the Wafd Party. However, over time the magazine became a critic of the party.

The cartoons published in Al Kashkul were produced by a Spanish teacher, Juan Sintes, who was working at the new Royal School of Arts. Its target audience was local people since it did not attempt to have an international readership. The magazine favored the use of the Cairene dialect which was implied as superior than both the southern Saidi dialect and the classical Arabic, the subdialects of Arabic spoken in Egypt. One of the caricatures published in the magazine in 1926 emphasizing the significance of independence of Egypt featured the well-known woman activist Huda Sha'arawi. In some cartoons the magazine personified Egypt as a white beautiful woman.

The circulation of Al Kashkul was not so high partly due to lower levels of literacy in Egypt and its high price. In the period 1927–1928 the magazine nearly sold 10,000 copies. However, it became extremely popular because of its caricatures that could be easily understood by Egyptians, including illiterate persons.

A caricature of Mustafa Kemal Atatürk, founder of Turkey, published in Al Kashkul caused a diplomatic crisis between two countries in that it featured Atatürk involved in opium business. Egyptian Foreign Minister Abdel Fattah Yahya Pasha argued that it should not be taken seriously since Al Kashkul was just a satirical magazine.
