= St. James Conference =

The first St. James Conference became a conference on the partition of once Turkish-held territories in the Balkans, particularly Scutari. It took place on 3 December 1912 during the First Balkan War.

The second St. James Conference (also Round-Table-Conference or London Conference) was a conference on the Partition for Palestine. It began on 7 February 1939 and lasted until 17 March 1939 at St James's Palace in London.

The conference followed the British Government statement of policy rejecting Partition Plan as impracticable in the light of the Woodhead Commission's report, suggesting that Arab-Jewish agreement might still be possible. An invitation was therefore extended to representatives of the Palestine Arabs, the neighboring Arab states and the Jewish Agency to confer with the British Government in London.

The conference was led by Malcolm MacDonald, the British colonial secretary, but no progress was made as the Arab delegates even refused to sit at the same table with the Jewish representatives. The Jewish delegation was headed by Chaim Weizmann and the Arab delegation by followers of the Mufti of Jerusalem. The meeting adjourned without result on 17 March 1939, and two months later Britain issued the White Paper of 1939.
