= Mohamed Mahmoud Pasha =

Prime Minister of Egypt (1928–1929, 1937–1939)

- محمد محمود باشا
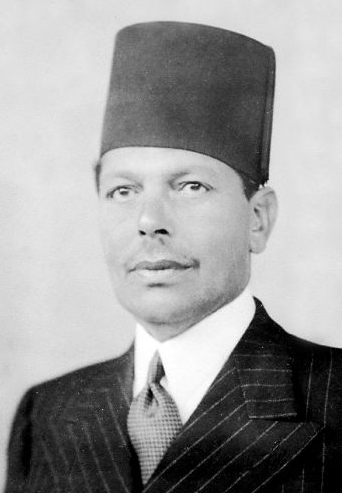

20th Prime Minister of Egypt
- In office 29 December 1937 – 18 August 1939
- Monarch: King Farouk
- Preceded by: Mostafa El-Nahas
- Succeeded by: Aly Maher Pasha
- In office 27 June 1928 – 4 October 1929
- Monarch: King Fuad I
- Preceded by: Mostafa El-Nahas
- Succeeded by: Adly Yakan Pasha
Further information
Minister of the Interior
In office 29 December 1937 – 24 June 1938
Prime Minister	Mohamed Mahmoud Pasha
Preceded by	Mostafa El-Nahas
Succeeded by	Mahmoud El Nokrashy Pasha
In office 27 June 1928 – 4 October 1929
Prime Minister	Mohamed Mahmoud Pasha
Preceded by	Mostafa El-Nahas
Succeeded by	Adly Yakan Pasha
Minister of Transportation
In office 7 June 1926 – 21 April 1927
Prime Minister	Adly Yakan Pasha
Preceded by	Joseph Cattaui
Succeeded by	Ahmed Muhammad Khashaba Pasha
Minister of Finance
In office 26 April 1927 – 25 June 1928
Prime Minister	Abdel Khalek Sarwat Pasha Mostafa El-Nahas
Preceded by	Morcos Hanna Pasha
Succeeded by	Aly Maher Pasha

Personal details
- Born: 1877 Sahel Selim, Egypt
- Died: 1 February 1941 (aged 63–64)
- Party: Liberal Constitutional Party
- Other political affiliations: Wafd party

Mohamed Mahmoud Pasha (Arabic: محمد محمود باشا) also known as Mohamed Mahmoud Khalil Pasha, was an early 20th century Egyptian politician.

== History ==
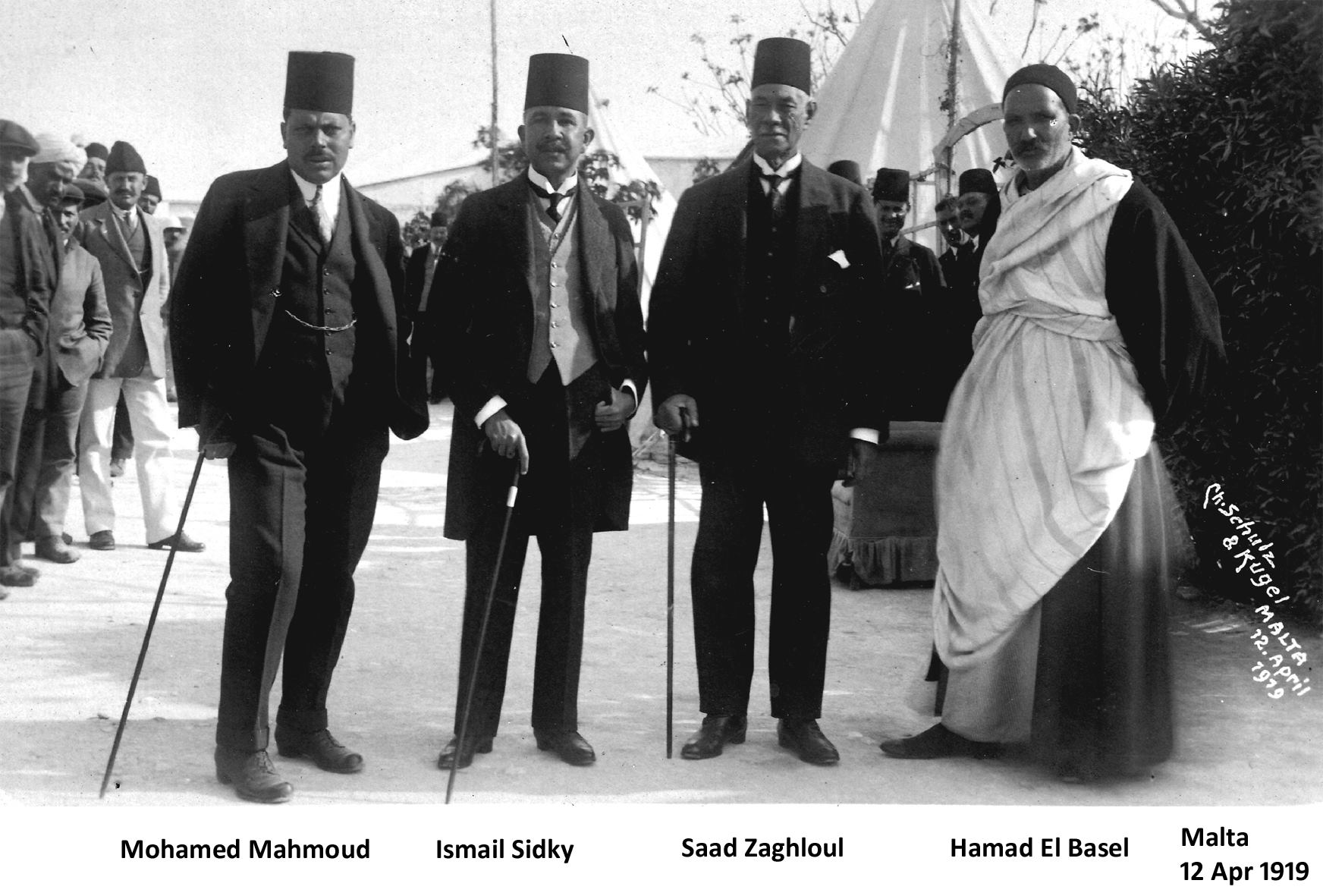
Egyptian nationalist in Malta. From left to right: Mohamed Mahmoud, Isma'il Sidqi, Saad Zaghloul, Hamad el-Basel

He was born in Sahel Selim on 1877 (Note: Another sources gives his birth day as 4 April 1878.) to a wealthy large landowning Egyptian family. His father helped found the Umma party in 1907. He was later educated Balliol College, Oxford. Throughout his political career, he served as governor of Fayyum, the Suez Canal district and Buhayra. He was a member of the Wafd party during the 1919 Egyptian revolution, and was exiled to the Seychelles alongside the Wafd party founder Saad Zaghloul. In the Wafd, he was a member of the original high command and of the second high command following the deportation of the first one. He later split from the Wafd in 1921 due to his support for Adly Yakan and helped found the Liberal Constitutional Party, serving as its first vice-president. He later became leader of the party in 1926, formally becoming president in 1928.

He served in a few cabinets until becoming prime minister from 1928 to 1929. He dissolved parliament on 19 July 1928 and suspended the constitution, choosing to rule by decree. During his premiership, his government entered into negotiations with the British to seek more domestic Egyptian political control of the country. The draft treaty provided for the withdrawal of British forces from the Suez Canal, British agreement to help Egypt abolish the Capitulations system and Sudan reverting to the status quo of 1924. For the Sudan, the Anglo-Egyptian Convention of 1899 was reaffirmed, with one Egyptian battalion sent to Sudan to satisfy public opinion. He was also able to secure the 1929 Nile waters agreement, codifying Egyptian rights to the Nile. However, the British believed that any permanent treaty with Egypt required the Wafd in power, since the Wafd was the only party capable of winning free elections. In the meanwhile, the Wafd lead a campaign against Mahmoud's government; Mahmoud in response banned several newspapers including Ruz al Yusuf. These events led to Mahmoud's resignation and a Wafd victory in the 1929 Egyptian parliamentary election.

The Wafd and the Liberals were brought together during the premiership of Ismail Sidqi. Sidqi suspended the 1923 constitution and replaced it with a much more autocratic document; the 1930 constitution greatly strengthen the powers of the king and weakened the parliament. The Wafd and Liberals agreed to form an alliance to fight against Sidqi's government. Both parties agreed to boycott the 1931 Egyptian parliamentary election. Mahmoud and Mustafa al-Nahhas, the leader of the Wafd party, toured Egypt to gather support for their cause. Mahmoud was also involvement in the 1935–1936 protests, rallying support against the regime.

Mahmoud was a member of the Egyptian negotiating team that eventually resulted in the 1936 Anglo-Egyptian treaty. During negotiations, he objected to the condition that the Egyptian government should build roads for British forces and assist Britain in war or "an apprehended international emergency", though accepted the military clauses on the conditions that the capitulations would be completely revoked. After a victory of the anti-Wafd parties in the 1938 elections, he became prime minister once again. As prime minister, he was more pro-British than before, due to concern of fascist Italy's expansion policies. He resigned on 12 August 1939 due to health reasons. He died on the 1 February 1941.

== Notes ==
Political offices
Preceded by Mostafa en-Nahhas Pasha	Prime Minister of Egypt; 1928–1929	Succeeded by Adly Yakan Pasha
Preceded by Mostafa en-Nahhas Pasha	Prime Minister of Egypt; 1937–1939	Succeeded by Aly Maher Pasha
