= Mostafa el-Nahas =

Prime Minister of Egypt (1928, 1930, 1936–1937, 1942–1944, 1950–1952)

Mostafa el-Nahas Pasha
- مصطفى النحاس باشا
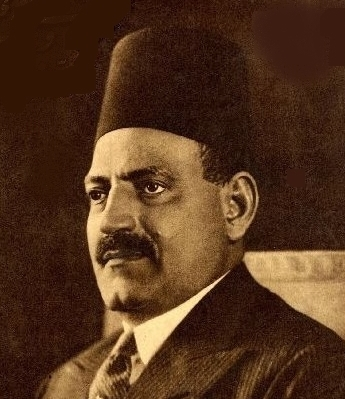

19th Prime Minister of Egypt
- In office March 16, 1928 – June 27, 1928
- Monarch: Fuad I
- Preceded by: Abdel Khalek Sarwat Pasha
- Succeeded by: Mohamed Mahmoud Pasha
- In office January 1, 1930 – June 20, 1930
- Monarch: Fuad I
- Preceded by: Adly Yakan Pasha
- Succeeded by: Ismail Sedky Pasha
- In office May 9, 1936 – December 29, 1937
- Monarch: Farouk I
- Preceded by: Aly Maher Pasha
- Succeeded by: Muhammad Mahmoud Pasha
- In office February 6, 1942 – October 10, 1944
- Monarch: Farouk I
- Preceded by: Hussein Serry Pasha
- Succeeded by: Ahmed Maher Pasha
- In office January 12, 1950 – January 27, 1952
- Monarch: Farouk I
- Preceded by: Hussein Serry Pasha
- Succeeded by: Aly Maher Pasha

Personal details
- Born: June 15, 1879 Gharbiyya, Khedivate of Egypt
- Died: August 23, 1965 (aged 86) Alexandria, Egypt
- Party: Wafd Party
- Spouse: Zainab Hanım Elwakil

Mostafa el-Nahas Pasha or Mostafa Nahas (Arabic: مصطفى النحاس باشا; June 15, 1879 (Note: Hazen (1976) puts the date of Nahas birth on June 10th) – August 23, 1965) was an Egyptian politician who served as the Prime Minister for five terms, the most out of any politician during Egypt's parliamentary era. He was the leader of the Wafd Party after the death of its founder Saad Zaghloul.

== Early life, education and exile ==
He was born in Samanud (Gharbiyya) where his father was a lumber merchant. He graduated from el-Nasiraiyah Elementary School in Cairo in 1891. He then graduated from the Khedivial Secondary School in 1896. After earning his license from the Khedivial Law School in 1900, he worked in Mohammad Farid's law office before opening his own practice in Mansoura. In 1904 he became a judge in the Tanta National Court. He was initially a member of the Watani party before joining Sa'ad Zaghloul's delegation - Arabic: Wafd - of Egyptian nationalists to the 1919 Paris Peace Conference. (Note: Long states that he joined Hizb al Ummah in 1918 before joining the Wafd.) He was dismissed from the bench in 1919 when he joined the Wafd and was exiled with Saad Zaghlul to the Seychelles from December 1921 to 1923 during the 1919 Egyptian revolution. Nahas sided with Zaghloul during a split in 1921 between him and Adly Yakan; supporters of Yakan would later found the Liberal Constitutional Party. Nahas was chosen upon his repatriation to represent Samanud in the first Chamber of Deputies elected under the 1923 Constitution.

== Political history ==
He became minister for communications during Zaghloul's ministry in 1924. Reelected in 1926 as a deputy from Sir Abu Nanna (Gharbiyya) and barred by the British from taking another cabinet post, he was elected one of the Chamber's two vice presidents and, in 1927, its president. Upon Saad Zaghloul's death in August 1927, he defeated Saad's nephew in the contest to lead the Wafd Party.

In 1928, Nahas formed his first government, while also serving as the minister of interior. This was his first and shortest government; he was dismissed by King Fuad after he refused to withdraw a law in the assembly that limited the police's ability to contain demonstrations, much to the annoyance of the British. While out of power, he took the position that the Wafd would not recognize any treaty with Britain while it was not in government. During his second term, he was unable to come to an agreement with the British foreign secretary Arthur Henderson. Specifically, Henderson refused to agree to Nahas' proposal of joint rule of Sudan. On the home front, Nahas resigned after the king refused to sign a bill allowing for the prosecution of ministers who attacked the 1923 constitution.

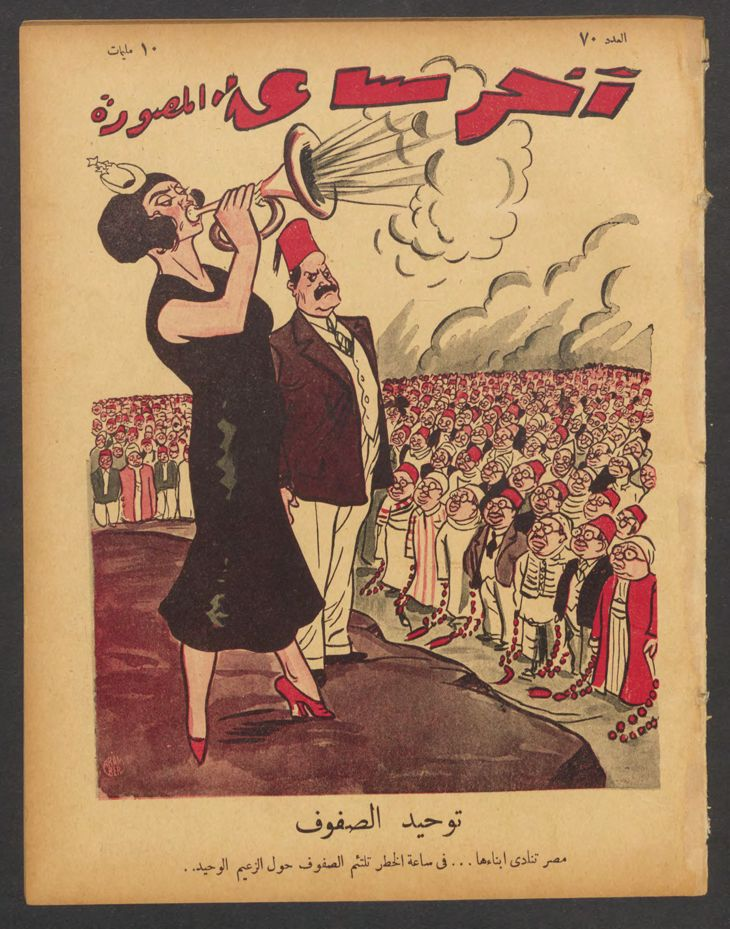
Front page political cartoon from Ahker Sa'a in 1935: "Unifying the Ranks: Egypt calls on its sons, in the hour of danger, the rank close around the sole leader"

From 1930 to 1935, the 1923 constitution was replaced by a new constitution under Ismail Sidky's government, which granted far more powers to the king while severely limiting the democratic system. The historian Marius Deeb called this time "The Palace-Sidqi Dictatorship". During this time, Nahas led the Wafd to revolt against the government. Nahas organized a boycott of British goods and large demonstrations, some of which, like in Mansura, were deadly. On the 31st of March 1931, the Wafd and the Liberal Constitutionalists agreed to form a coalition to work for the restoration of the constitution, while boycotting the 1931 elections. The need to curtail the autocracy of the conservative monarchy lead the Wafd closer to the British. It was during this time that on June 12th, 1934, Nahas married Zainab Hanim al-Wakil, the daughter of a prominent Wafdist in Beheira. One of the reasons for this marriage was a law passed by the Sidqi government that forbade retired officials from getting a pension if they not married by fifty-five; Nahas was married two days before his fifty-fifth birthday.

After Sidqi resigned over health reasons, Naseem Pasha became prime minister. Nahas tried to pressure Neseem to reinstate the 1923 constitution, but agreed to delay the issue for the time being, costing the Wafd Rose al Yusuf and its writer Abbas Al-Aqqad, as well losing the patience of many rank and file Wafd supporters. However, when the British Foreign Secretary Samuel Hoare announced his opposition to both the 1923 and 1930 constitution, the constitutional question morphed into a nationalist question, as student protests rocked the nation. During these protests that Wafd approved the creation of a student paramilitary organization, the Blue Shirts, on January of 1936. The Blue Shirts would later engage in street battles with Young Egypt's Green Shirts, much to the concern of the palace establishment. These protests led to restoration of the 1923 constitution, allowing the Wafd to return to power for the first time in six years.

After a victory in the 1936 elections, Nahas formed his third government. During this time, Nahas achieved two major diplomatic victories with Britain: the Anglo-Egyptian Treaty of 1936 and the 1937 Montreux Convention. However, his government faced issues with the new king, King Farouk. The Wafd opposed the religiosity of the coronation as a threat to secularism and democracy. Issues between the Palace and the Government over the Blue Shirts, the right to appoint vacate senate seats and the appointment of Ali Maher as Chief of the Royal Cabinet lead to resignation of Nahas. It was also during this that the party split.

The Wafd had traditionally been divided over socioeconomic lines - between rural land owners and the urban middle class. The latter was represented by the "gang of four": Nahas, Makram Ebied, Ahmad Mahir, and Mahmud Fahmi al-Nukrashi. This wing of the party came into power after the election of Nahas to leader of the party. Yet cracks in alliance were forming by 1935. Nukrashi and Mahir were opposed to Naseem's government, while Nahas accused Nukrashi as being responsible for Britain's hardline stance in 1930, since he was in favor of continuing negotiations despite the Sudan issue. Nukrashi and Mahir accused Nahas of running the party as a dictator and building a personality cult. Another issue was regarding the construction of the Aswan Dam. Nukrashi supported opening the project up to international bidding, while Nahas and Makram wanted to give it to a British firm. After a cabinet reshuffle, Mahmud al-Nuqrashi was out of the government and expelled from the party. Ahmad Mahir also left; him and Nuqrashi formed the Sa'adist Party, claiming to be the real successors to Sa'ad Zaghloul. On November 28th, 1937, Ezz al-Din Tewfiq, a member of Young Egypt, tried to assassinate Nahas.

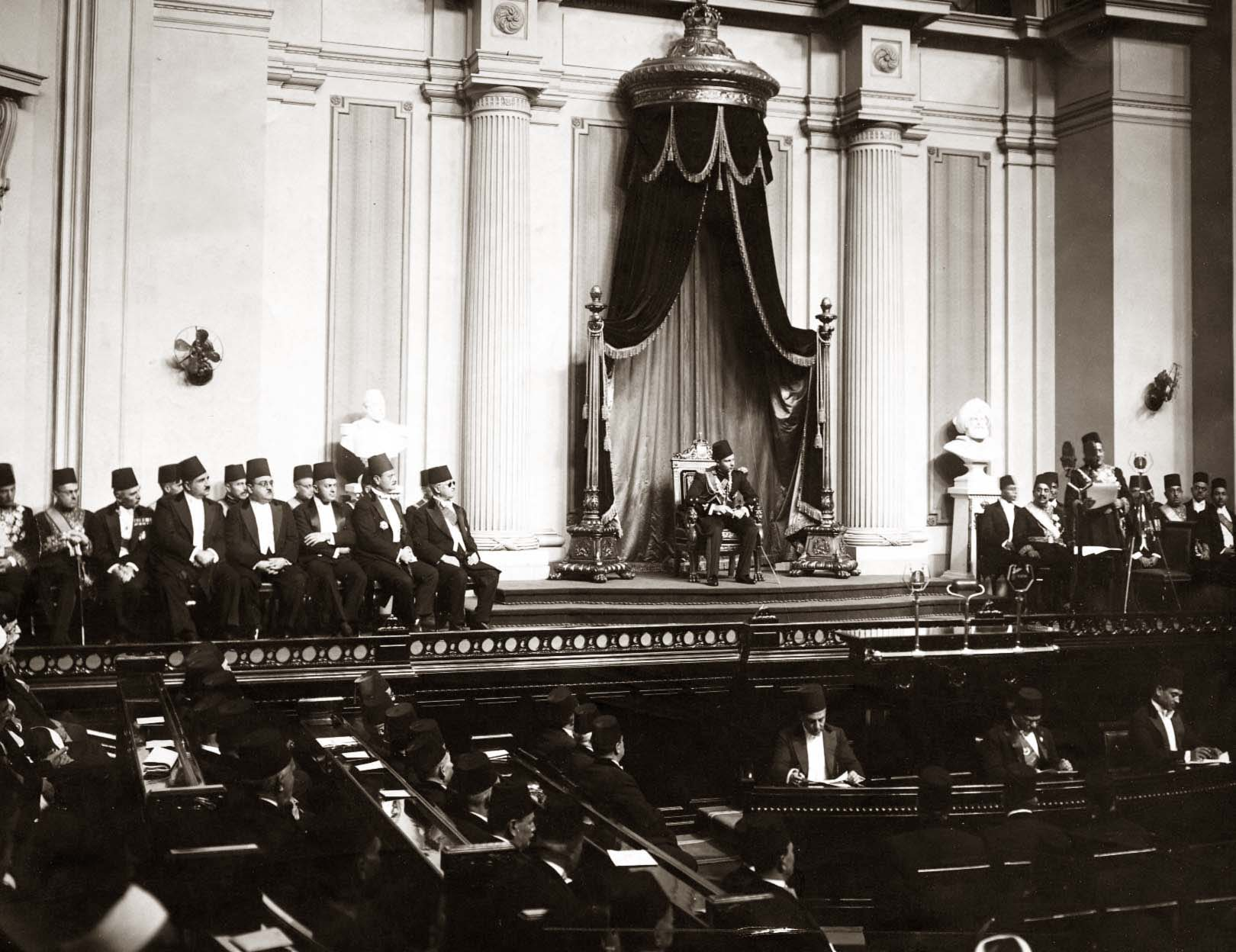
King Farouk I of Egypt in Parliament listening to Mustafa el-Nahas Pasha's speech (1937)

The Wafd would remain out of power until the 1942 Abdeen Palace Incident, where British pressure forced King Farouk to appoint Nahas prime minister. Nahas then fell out with his patron, Makram Ebeid who was serving as the Finance minister and expelled him from the Wafd and the cabinet at the instigation of his wife. Ebeid retaliated with The Black Book, a detailed expose published in the spring of 1943 listing 108 cases of major corruption involving Nahas and his wife. Ebeid accused Nahas of having the Egyptian embassy in London buy expensive silver-fox fur coats for his wife with government funds; of confiscating a school in the Garden City area of Cairo to turn into his personal office; of using government money to irrigate land in the desert owned by his cousin; and of abusing his position as prime minister to pressure landowners in the Nile delta to sell farmland to him. Against Madame Nahas, Ebeid accused her of engaging in insider trading on the Alexandria cotton exchange and of pressuring her husband to appoint members of her family to high offices of state that they were not qualified for. Even Lampson wrote in his diary that "the so-called book does seem to contain pretty damaging evidence". His wife died two years after his death in 1967. His and her cemetery are located in the Elwakil yard in Basateen, Cairo. He also helped found the Arab League in 1944.

In 1950, in a volte-face that stunned observers of Egyptian politics, Karim Thabet of King Farouk's "kitchen cabinet" arranged an alliance between the king and Nahas Pasha. The U.S ambassador Jefferson Caffery reported to Washington:

"The proposal was that the King would receive Nahas in private audience prior to summoning a Wafd government and that if the King were not satisfied by his conversation with Nahas, Nahas gave his word or honor that he would retire from the leadership of the Wafd Party as an "elder statesmen" and that the King would then be free to choose any of the younger Wafd leaders in whom he had confidence. The King agreed to this proposal and was completely captivated by Nahas, who tactfully started the interview by swearing that his one desire in life was to kiss the King's hand and to remain always worthy in His Majesty's opinion of being allowed to repeat the performance. At this point Nahas went on his knees before the King who according to Thabet was so charmed that he assisted him to his feet with the words, "Rise, Mr. Prime Minister"".

Caffery reported in his cable to Washington that he was appalled that Nahas, whom Caffery called the most stupid and corrupt politician in Egypt, was now prime minister. Caffery stated that Nahas was unqualified to be prime minister because of his "completely total ignorance of the facts of life as they apply to the situation today", giving the example:

"Most observers are willing to concede that Nahas knows of the existence of Korea, but I have found no one who would be willing to seriously contend that he is aware of the fact that Korea borders on Red China. His ignorance is as colossal as it is appalling...At the time of my interview with Nahas he was totally unconscious of the subject which I was discussing. The only ray of light which penetrated was that I wanted something from him. This prompted the street politician's response of "aidez-nous et nous vous aiderons".

Caffery stated that Nahas's French (the language of the Egyptian elite) was "of dubious quality" and he spoke a colloquial Egyptian Arabic more appropriate to the streets than the high society of Cairo. Caffery called Nahas a venal "street politician" whose only platform was the "tried and true formula of 'Evacuation and Unity of the Nile Valley'" and stated the only positive aspect of him as prime minister was that "we can get anything which we want from him if we are willing to pay for it".

Nahas's government was extremely corrupt and in year 1951 alone Madame Nahas had acquired ownership of one thousand acres of farmland in the Nile Delta, which was ideal for growing cotton and made her into an extremely rich woman. The Korean War caused a shortfall in the American cotton production as young men were called up for national service, causing a cotton boom in Egypt. As the international prices for cotton rose, Egyptian landlords forced their tenant farmers to grow more cotton at the expense of food, leading to major food shortages and inflation in Egypt. Nahas passed a law forbidding Egyptian farmers to grow wheat, which would done something to reduce the food shortages and the consequent inflation, as he and his wife personally benefited from the high international prices for cotton.

Nahas promised in early 1951 a Five Year Plan to provide a $20 million US dollars for a universal pension system plus money for improved education, clean drinking water, and better roads, but nothing came of the plan while the corruption continued unabated. He was one of the signers of the Anglo-Egyptian Treaty of 1936, but in 1951 he denounced it. In a bid for popularity amid rumors that King Farouk was planning to dismiss him, on 17 October 1951 Nahas unilaterally abrogated the 1936 Anglo-Egyptian treaty, making himself the hero of the hour. Nahas told Parliament: "It was for Egypt that I signed the 1936 treaty and it is for Egypt that I call on you to abrogate it".

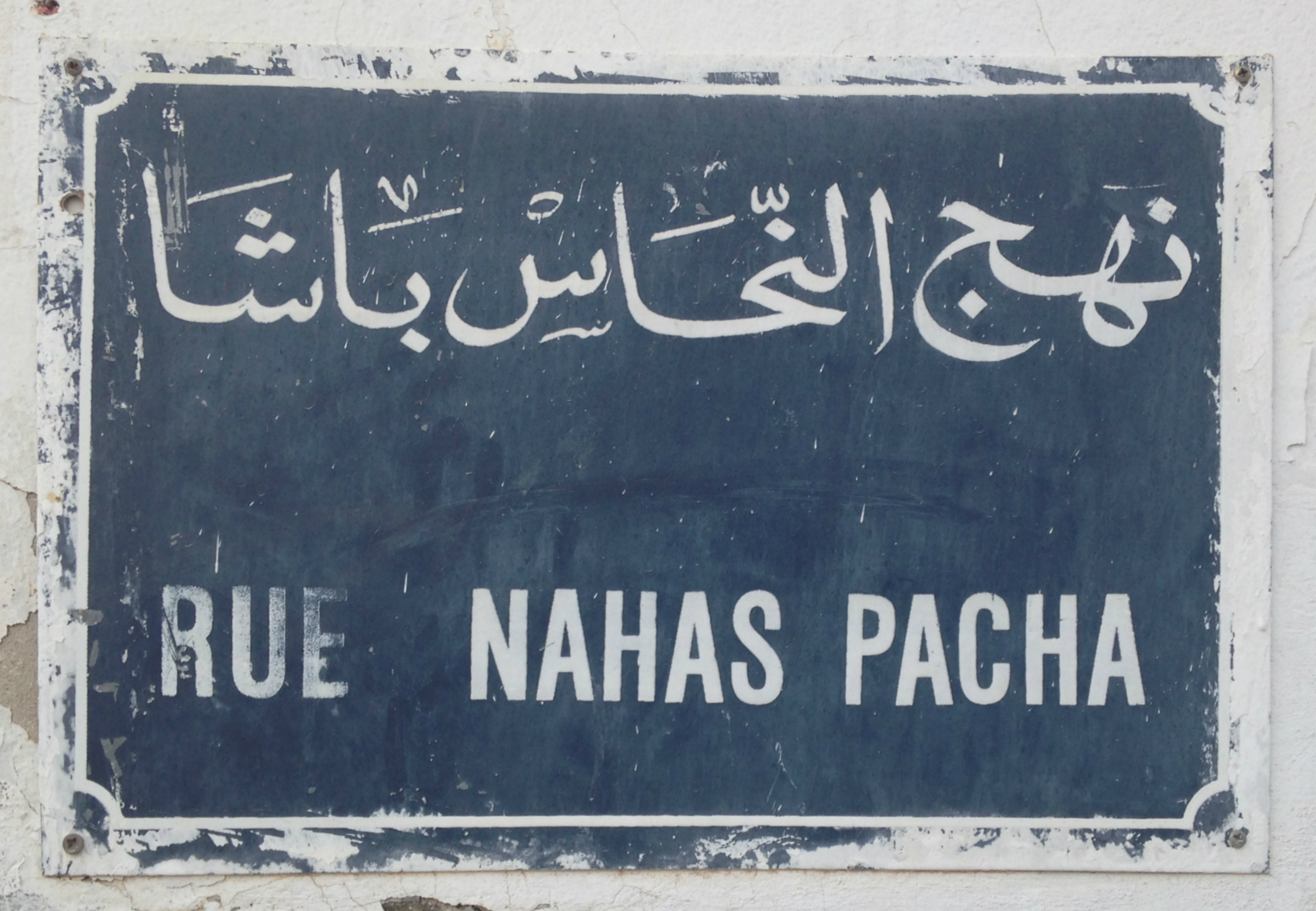
Nahas Pacha Khniss Street in the city of Tunis

As the British refused to leave their base around the Suez Canal, the Egyptian government cut off the water and refused to allow food into the Suez Canal base, announced a boycott of British goods, forbade Egyptian workers to enter the base and sponsored guerrilla attacks, turning the area around the Suez Canal into a low level war zone. On 24 January 1952, Egyptian guerrillas staged a fierce attack on the British forces around the Suez Canal, during which the Egyptian Auxiliary Police were observed helping the guerrillas. In response, General George Erskine on 25 January sent out British tanks and infantry to surround the auxiliary police station in Ismailia and gave the policemen an hour to surrender their arms under the grounds the police were arming the guerrillas. The police commander called the Interior Minister, Fouad Serageddin, Nahas's right-hand man, who was smoking cigars in his bath at the time, to ask if he should surrender or fight. Serageddin ordered the police to fight "to the last man and the last bullet". The resulting battle saw the police station leveled and 43 Egyptian policemen killed, together with 3 British soldiers. The Ismailia incident outraged Egypt and the next day, 26 January 1952 was "Black Saturday", as the anti-British riot was known, that saw much of Downtown Cairo, which Khedive Ismail the Magnificent had rebuilt in the style of Paris, burned down. Farouk blamed the Wafd for the Black Saturday riot and dismissed Nahas as prime minister the next day.

After the Egyptian Revolution of 1952, the Wafd Party was dissolved. Both he and his wife were imprisoned from 1953 to 1954. He then retired to private life. His death on 23 August 1965 led to a mass demonstration at his funeral that was allowed by Gamal Abdel Nasser's government.

== Honours ==
=== Egyptian national honours ===
Ribbon bar	Honour
	Grand Cordon of the Order of the Nile
	Grand Cordon of the Order of Muhammad Ali
	Grand Cordon of the Order of Ismail

=== Foreign honors ===
Ribbon bar	Country	Honour
	Ethiopian Empire	Grand Cordon of the Order of Solomon
	Kingdom of Greece	Grand Commander of the Order of the Redeemer
	Kingdom of Italy	Grand Officier Order of the Crown of Italy
	Kingdom of Tunisia	Grand Cordon of the Order of Glory (Tunisia)
	United Kingdom	Honorary Knight Commander Order of St Michael and St George

== Sources ==
- Al-Hadidy, Alaa al-Din (1993). "Mustafa al-Nahhas and political leadership". Contemporary Egypt: Through Egyptian Eyes. Routledge.
- el-Din Aly, Mohammed Alaa (1985). Mustafa Al-Nahhas: a Case Study of Egyptian Political Leadership (PDF) (Thesis). University of London.
- Al-Sayyid-Marsot, Afaf Lutfi (1977). Egypt's Liberal Experiment: 1922–1936. University of California Press. ISBN 9780520031098.
- Deeb, Marius (1979). Party Politics in Egypt: the Wafd & its rivals 1919–1939. Ithaca Press. ISBN 9780903729406.
- Goldschmidt, Arthur (2023). "Al-Nahhas, Mustafa". Historical Dictionary of Egypt (5th ed.). Rowman & Littlefield. pp. 277–279. ISBN 9781538157350.
- Hazen, William Edward (1976). Mustafa al-Nahhas: The Leader of the Wafd (Thesis). Johns Hopkins University. ProQuest 7622922.
- Jankowski, James P. (1970). "The Egyptian Blue Shirts and the Egyptian Wafd, 1935–1938". Middle Eastern Studies. 6 (1): 77–95. JSTOR 4282308.
- Long, Richard (2005). "Appendix 2: Egyptian personalities". British Pro-Consuls in Egypt, 1914-1929 : The Challenge of Nationalism. RoutledgeCurzon. pp. 188–189.
- Lerman, Eran (2002). "Nahhas, the Arab League, and the Postwar Order: a Reinterpretation". In Gammer, Moshe (ed.). Political Thought and Political History Studies in Memory of Elie Kedourie. Routledge.
- Moore, David F. (1965). The Wafd Party of Egypt: 1936–1945 (Thesis). American University of Beirut. ProQuest 2316005707.
- Quraishi, Zaheer M. (1967). Liberal Nationalism in Egypt; Rise and Fall of the Wafd Party. Jamal Printing Press. ISBN 9780861990009.
- Stadiem, William (1991). Too Rich: The High Life and Tragic Death of King Farouk. Carroll & Graf Pub. ISBN 9780881846294.
- Terry, Janice J. (1982). The Wafd: Cornerstone of Egyptian Political Power. Publisher: Third World Centre for Research and Publishing. ISBN 9780861990009.

Political offices
Preceded by Abdel Khalek Sarwat Pasha	Prime Minister of Egypt; 1928	Succeeded by Mohamed Mahmoud Pasha
Preceded by Adly Yakan Pasha	Prime Minister of Egypt; 1930	Succeeded by Ismail Sedky Pasha
Preceded by Aly Maher Pasha	Prime Minister of Egypt; 1936–1937	Succeeded by Mohamed Mahmoud Pasha
Preceded by Hussein Serry Pasha	Prime Minister of Egypt; 1942–1944	Succeeded by Ahmed Maher Pasha
Preceded by Hussein Serry Pasha	Prime Minister of Egypt; 1950–1952	Succeeded by Aly Maher Pasha
