= Ittihad Party =

Ittihad Party حزب الاتحاد
- Founder: Hasan Nashat
- President: Yahya Ibrahim
- Vice President: Aly Maher Pasha
- Founded: 1924
- Dissolved: 1936
- Split from: Wafd Party
- Headquarters: Al-Azhar Mosque, Cairo
- Newspaper: Al-Ittihad; Al-Shab al-Masri
- Ideology: Egyptian nationalism Islamic democracy Traditionalism
- Political position: Right-wing
- Religion: Sunni Islam
- International affiliation: Muslim Brotherhood (1928–36)
- Colours: Blue

Ittihad is separate and distinct from Union Party.

The Ittihad Party or Union Party ("Ettihad Party", Arabic: حزب الاتحاد, Hizb al-Ittihad) was an royalist political party active in the Kingdom of Egypt.

The party was founded by supporters of King Fuad I in January 1925 by Egyptian conservatives in opposition to the liberal Wafd party. The party was established by the vice chief of the Royal Cabinet Hasan Nashat.

The party was founded by a group of ulamas with royalist and Islamist ideas that legitimized the Sir Lee Stack's assassination in 1924. This group was composed also by young future political leaders like Muhammad Hamid Abu al-Nasr and Aly Maher Pasha. The ideological values were entrenched in the Egyptian "traditional" culture. The party was gathering in the Al-Azhar Mosque. The Ittihad was financially supported by King Fuad I and British agents, that trusted that the Ittihad would have destabilized the activities of the left-wing radicals. The party was closer to a royalist clique than a political party. Nevertheless, the Ittihad failed in its goal of building a conservative party, due to its religious views. Its platform was composed mainly by teachers, farmers, ulamas and imams.

The party program was:

- Dignified positions of the religious authorities
- Better resources for the Egyptian monarchy
- Monopoly over the distribution of public and private endowments
- Creation of the Awqaf
- Strong social values and solidarity
- Anti-Western policies

The Ittihad was also tutelaged by Hassan al-Banna's Muslim Brotherhood. After this alliance, the Ittihad became mostly active against Copts, refused the French Revolution, reputed as anarchy, and supported a strong authoritarian state. Despite its low electoral results, the party took over the government of Egypt in 1930s thanks to the support of independent politicians present in the House of Representatives.

The party didn't have a long life and in 1936 was dissolved. Its members adhered mainly to Wafd Party and Muslim Brotherhood.

== Electoral results ==
=== House of Representatives elections ===
Election	Party leader	Seats	+/–	Position
1925	Mohamed Tawfik Naseem Pasha	29 / 211	▲10	▲3rd
1926	Mohamed Tawfik Naseem Pasha	1 / 215	▼28	3rd
1929	Mohamed Tawfik Naseem Pasha	0 / 150	▼1	▼4th
1931	Mohamed Tawfik Naseem Pasha	40 / 150	▲40	▲2nd

== Bibliography ==
- Deeb, Marius (1979). Party Politics in Egypt: the Wafd & its rivals 1919–1939. Ithaca Press.
- Khatib, M.F. (1954). The working of parliamentary institutions in Egypt, 1924-1952 (Thesis). University of Edinburgh.
- Whidden, James (2013). Monarchy and Modernity in Egypt: Politics, Islam and Neo-Colonialism Between the Wars. I.B. Tauris.
