= Abbas Mahmoud al-Aqqad =

Egyptian journalist and poet (1889–1964)

- عباس محمود العقاد
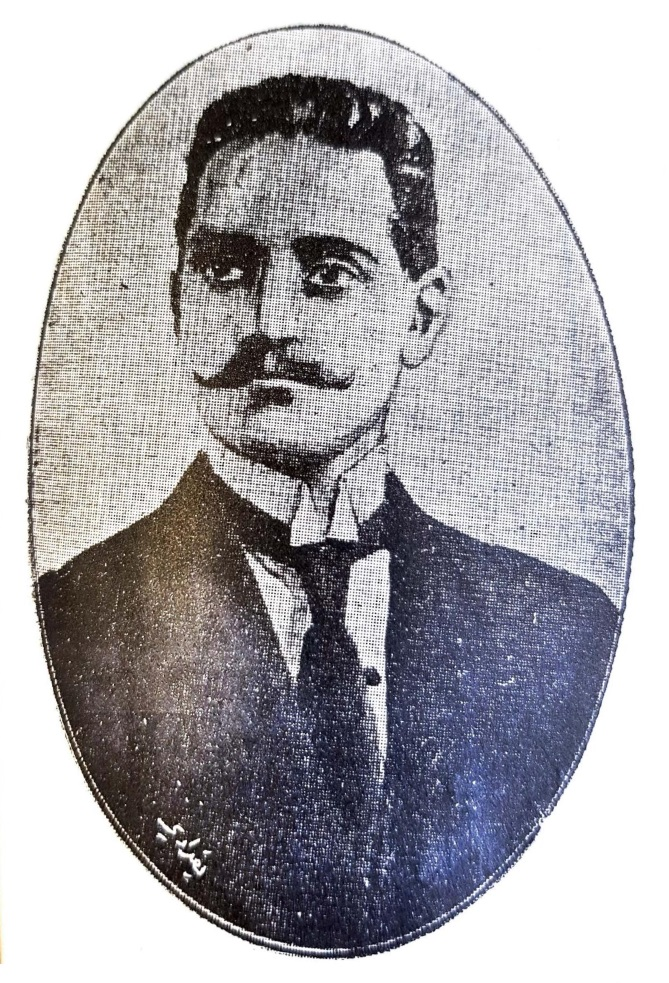
- Photo of Abbas Mahmud al-Aqqad
- Born: 28 June 1889; Aswan, Khedivate of Egypt
- Died: 13 March 1964 (aged 74); Cairo, United Arab Republic
- Occupation: writer

Abbas Mahmoud al-Aqqad (Arabic: عباس محمود العقاد, ALA-LC: ‘Abbās Maḥmūd al-‘Aqqād; 28 June 1889 – 12 March 1964) was an Egyptian journalist, poet and literary critic, and member of the Academy of the Arabic Language in Cairo.

More precisely, because "his writings cover a broad spectrum, including poetry, criticism, Islamology, history, philosophy, politics, biography, science, and Arabic literature", he is perceived to be a polymath.

== Biography ==
Al-Aqqad was born in Aswan, a city in Upper Egypt, in 1889. His father was a money-changer originally from the Egyptian rural city of Damietta while his mother had Kurdish roots. He received little formal education, completing only his elementary education; he later supplemented his learning by buying books and reading on his own. Unlike his schoolmates, he spent all his weekly allowance on books. He read about religion, geography, history and many other subjects. He was known for his excellent English and French. He was also particularly well-read in German literature.

Al-'Aqqad was also an outspoken political thinker, and was jailed for a time between 1930 and 1931 for criticizing the country's government. In 1942 when the forces of Adolf Hitler advanced on Egypt, al-'Aqqad fled to Sudan due to fear of reprisal for his criticism of Hitler. At the height of Hitler's military advances, al-'Aqqad wrote his scathing work Hitler in the Balance in June 1940 in which he lambasts Nazism as the greatest threat to freedom, modernity and the very existence of man. In addition to his general opposition to both fascism and communism, al-'Aqqad was also both a member of the Egyptian parliament for a time as a member of the Wafd Party, and later a member of the Chamber of Deputies.

He wrote more than a hundred of books about philosophy, religion, and poetry, along with a philosophical study of the Qur'an and various biographies of historic Muslim leaders. He founded a poetry school with Ibrahim Al-Mazny and Abdel Rahman Shokry called Al-Diwan.

== Romantic relationships ==
Al-Aqqad experienced two major romantic relationships in his life. The first was whom he called "Sarah" in his novel of the same name. The second was with the famous Egyptian actress Madiha Yousri. This relationship was ended by al-Aqqad himself, because of Yousri's career as an actress. Al-Aqqad wrote a poetry work about this relationship called Cyclones of a Sunset (A-Asiru Maghrib in Arabic).

It was reported by prolific Egyptian author Anis Mansour and various other attendees of Al-Aqqad's famous 'lounge' that he kept a painting in his bedroom that displayed a beautiful cake with cockroaches crawling over it. Supposedly, Al-Aqqad kept this in his room as 'the first thing he looked at in the morning and the last thing he saw in the evening'. It symbolized beauty and purity (the cake) that is wasted to the glamor of spotlights (the cockroaches) as was the case (as he perceived) with actress Madiha Yousri.

== Recognition ==
The Egyptian President Gamal Abdel Nasser awarded him the State Appreciation Award in Literature 1958

== Death ==
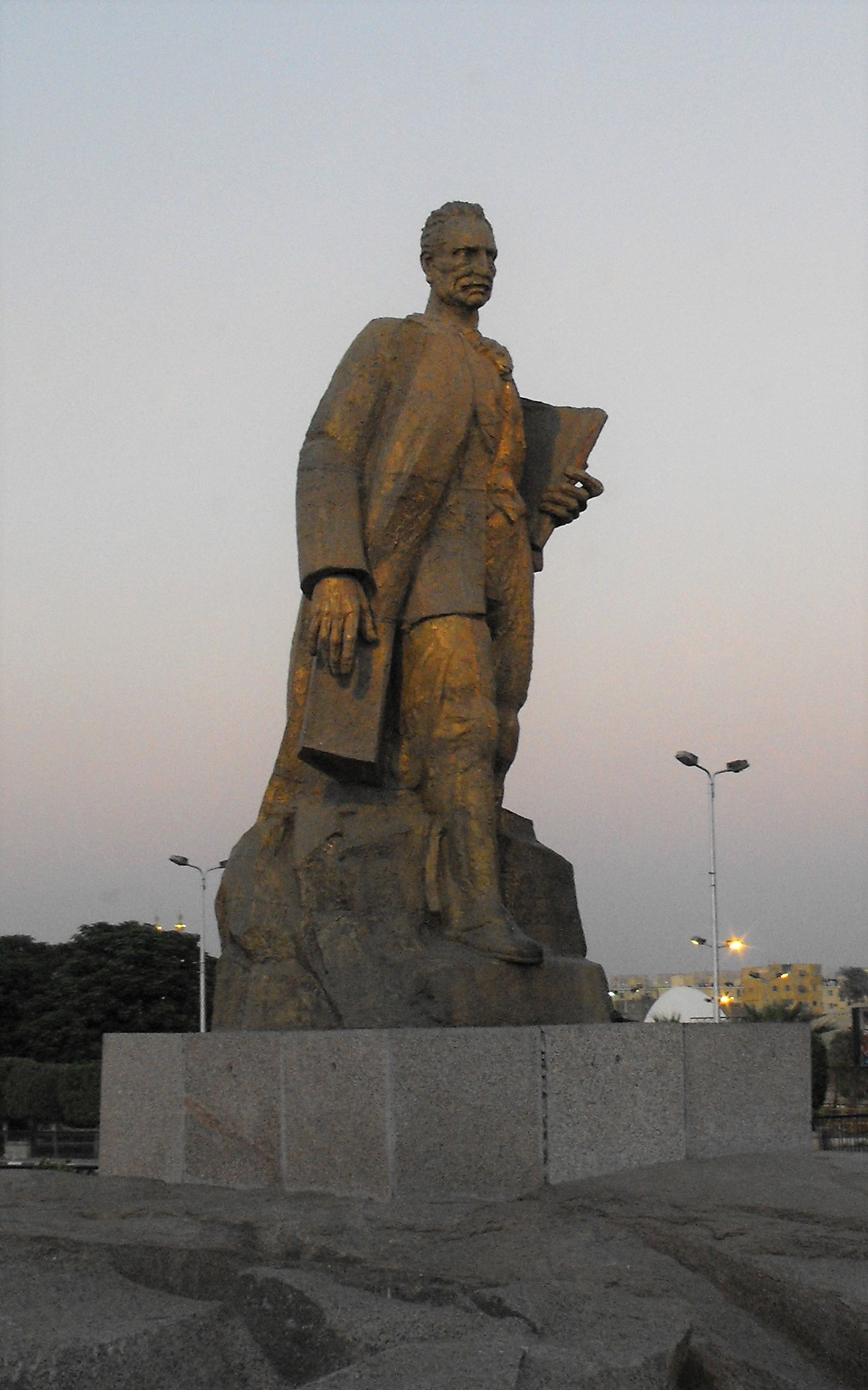
Al-Aqqad's statue in his hometown, Aswan

Al-Aqqad died on the morning of 13 March 1964. His body was transported to his hometown, Aswan, for burial on the same day.

In the early 1980s, an Egyptian television series was produced about the life of al-Aqqad, which was titled The Giant (Al Imlaq in Arabic). It starred Egyptian actor Mahmud Mursi.

There is a street in the Nasr City district of Cairo named after al-Aqqad.

== Works ==
Abbās al-Aqqād was "a prolific writer, he authored over a hundred books and several thousand articles", and he is most famous for his Abqarīyat (Geniuses) series which consists of seven books that cover the life of seven of the most important Sahabah like Abu Bakr and Ali. His works include:

- Allah (2025) translated by Arabic Virtual Translation Center, ISBN 9798260302897.
- The Genius of Muhammad (2025) translated by Arabic Virtual Translation Center, ISBN 9798260391754.
- The Genius of Christ (2026) translated by Arabic Virtual Translation Center, ISBN 9798279666461.
- The Genius of Abu-Bakr Al-Siddiq (2026) translated by Arabic Virtual Translation Center, ISBN 9798256336721.
- The Genius of `Umar-Bin-Al-Khattab (2026) translated by Arabic Virtual Translation Center, ISBN 9798182584425.
- `Uthman-Bin-`Affan (2026) translated by Arabic Virtual Translation Center, ISBN 9798179912415.
- Sārah (in Arabic). Cairo: Dār Nahḍ̣at Miṣr lil-Nashr. 1999. ISBN 9771409174.
- Abqarīyat al-Imām ʻAlī (in Arabic). Cairo: Dār Nahḍ̣at Miṣr lil-Nashr. 2003. ISBN 9770186961.
- Abqarīyat Muḥammad (in Arabic). Cairo: Dār Nahḍ̣at Miṣr lil-Nashr. 2004. ISBN 9771426672.
- Abqarīyat ʻUmar (in Arabic). Cairo: Dār Nahḍ̣at Miṣr lil-Nashr. 2007. ISBN 978-9771421061.
- Abqarīyat Khālid (in Arabic). Cairo: Dār Nahḍ̣at Miṣr lil-Nashr. 2011. ISBN 978-9771425588.
- Dhū al-nūrayn : ʻUthmān ibn ʻAffān (in Arabic). Cairo: Dār Nahḍ̣at Miṣr lil-Nashr. 2012. ISBN 978-9771423966.
- Abqarīyat Aṣ-Ṣiddīq (in Arabic). Cairo: Dār Nahḍ̣at Miṣr lil-Nashr. 2008.
- Democracy in Islam (in Arabic). Cairo: Dār Nahḍ̣at Miṣr lil-Nashr. 2008. ISBN 978-9771423355.
- Averroes (in Arabic). Cairo: Dar Elmaaref. 1992.
- Global Zionism (in Arabic). Cairo: Dār Nahḍ̣at Miṣr lil-Nashr. 2009. ISBN 978-9771442936.
- Quran Philosophy (in Arabic). Cairo: Dar AlKitab Al Arabi. 1969.
- Allah (in Arabic). Cairo: Dār Nahḍ̣at Miṣr lil-Nashr.
- The genius of Christ (2001) translated F. Peter Ford, ISBN 1586841041.

== See also ==
- Ahmad Abd al-Ghafur Attar
