= Liberal Constitutional Party (Egypt) =

Liberal political party in Egypt (1922–1952)

Liberal Constitutional Party حزب الاحرار الدستوريين
- Secretary-General: Muhammad Ali Alluba
- Historical leader: Adli Yakan Pasha (1922–1924); Abdel Aziz Fahmy (1924–1926); Muhammad Mahmoud Pasha (1926–1941); Abdel Aziz Fahmy (1941–1942); Mohammed Hussein Heikal (1943–1952)
- Founded: 30 October 1922
- Dissolved: 17 January 1953
- Split from: Wafd Party
- Headquarters: Cairo
- Newspaper: Al Siyasa
- Ideology: Constitutional monarchy Liberal democracy Social liberalism
- Political position: Centre-right
- Colours: Violet

The Liberal Constitutional Party (Arabic: حزب الاحرار الدستوريين, Ḥizb al-aḥrār al-dustūriyyīn) was an Egyptian political party founded in 1922 by a group of politicians who left the larger Wafd Party. While both the Wafd and the Liberal Constitutionalists agreed on Egyptian independence, the latter believed in gradualism and was against violence. The party represented the liberal upper class of Egypt, typically landowners. It was banned, like the other political parties in Egypt, after the coup d'état of 1952.

== History ==
During the 1919 Egyptian revolution, a delegation of Egyptian nationaists led by Saad Zaghloul demanded independence from British control, as Egypt had been a protectorate since the World War I. This delegation (Arabic: Wafd) later became the Wafd party. During the years of negotiations between British officials and Egyptian nationalists, Adly Yakan emerged as a moderate voice compared to Zaghloul. Adly's delegation was supported by Lufti al-Sayyid, Abdel Aziz Fahmy and Muhamad Mahmoud. On 16 March 1921, Adly was appointed by the sultan to form a cabinet as prime minister and lead the negotiations. The Unilateral Declaration of Egyptian Independence was declared on 28 February 1922.

The Liberal Constitutional Party was founded on 30 October 1922 during a meeting at the Shepheard's Hotel chaired by Adli Yakan Pasha, and some time later the party launched a newspaper, Al Siyasa (Politics). Adly was elected leader, Muhamad Mahmoud one of his vice presidents. The initial 300 supporters made up a general assembly who elected an administrative board of twenty-six. (Note: Another source claims that the assembly elected thirty members for the board.) According to the party statute, the board was to be elected by the assembly every three years, who then elected a president, two vice-presidents a secretary and treasurer.

Although the Wafd Party was nationalist and conservative views, the new party supported the constitution which was approved on 19 April 1923, the secularization of the State, the United Kingdom and also the total unification of Egypt and Sudan. Muhammad Alluba, a supporter of the Palestine cause, served as the general secretary of the party in the 1930s.

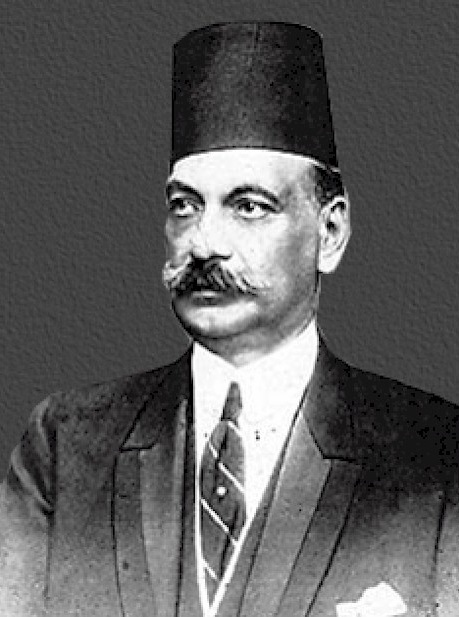
Adly Yakan Pasha, the party's founder, and a three-time Prime minister of Egypt

=== Leaders ===
- 1922-1924 – Adli Yakan Pasha
- 1924-1926 – Abdel Aziz Fahmy
- 1926-1941 – Muhammad Mahmoud Pasha
- 1941-1942 – Abdel Aziz Fahmy
- 1943-1952 – Mohammed Hussein Heikal (Note: After the death of Mahmoud in January 1941, Fahmy returned to the presidency until July 1942. After some party squabbling, Haykal became president on January 1943.)

== Electoral history ==
=== Chamber of Deputies elections ===
Election	Party leader	Seats	+/–	Position
1923–1924	Adly Yakan Pasha	20 / 211	▲20	▲2nd
1925	Adly Yakan Pasha	40 / 211	▲20	2nd
1926	Adly Yakan Pasha	29 / 211	▼11	2nd
1929	Muhammad Mahmoud Pasha	5 / 232	▼24	2nd
1931	Muhammad Mahmoud Pasha	0 / 150	▼5	▼ Boycotted
1936	Muhammad Mahmoud Pasha	15 / 232	▲15	▲2nd
1938	Muhammad Mahmoud Pasha	77 / 264	▲62	2nd
1942	Abdel Aziz Fahmy	4 / 264	▼73	2nd
1945	Mohammed Hussein Heikal	75 / 264	▲71	2nd
1950	Mohammed Hussein Heikal	28 / 319	▼47	▼3rd
