= List of ministers of education of Egypt =

List of ministers who have headed the Ministry of Education of Egypt

This is a list of ministers who have headed the Ministry of Education of Egypt.

== List ==
=== Monarchical era (1873–1952) ===
Name		Served from	Served until	Reference
English	Arabic	Served from	Served until	Reference
Mustafa Riyad Pasha	مصطفى رياض باشا	15 August 1873	24 May 1874	
Muhammad Thabet	محمد ثابت	25 May 1874	6 September 1874	
Tusun Pasha	طوسون باشا	7 September 1874	31 August 1875	
Yehya Mansur Yeghen Pasha	يحيى منصور يكن باشا	1 September 1875	21 June 1876	
Mustafa Riyad Pasha	مصطفى رياض باشا	25 June 1876	13 October 1877	
Isma'il Ayub Pasha	إسماعيل أيوب باشا	14 October 1877	27 August 1878	
Ali Mubarak Pasha	علي مبارك باشا	28 August 1878	8 April 1879	
Muhammad Thabet Pasha	محمد ثابت باشا	9 April 1879	1 July 1879	
Mahmoud Sami el-Baroudi Pasha	محمود سامي البارودي باشا	2 July 1879	17 August 1879	
Ali Ibrahim Pasha	علي إبراهيم باشا	18 August 1879	9 September 1881	
Abdallah Fekri Pasha	عبد الله فكري باشا	4 February 1882	26 May 1882	
Suleiman Abaza Pasha	سليمان أباظة باشا	2 June 1882	27 August 1882	
Ahmed Khairi Pasha	أحمد خيري باشا	21 August 1882	10 January 1884	
Mahmud Ahmad Hamdi al-Falaki	محمود حمدي الفلكي	10 January 1884	9 June 1888	
Ali Mubarak Pasha	علي باشا مبارك	9 June 1888	14 May 1891	
Mohamed Zaky Pasha		14 May 1891	January 1893	
Mustafa Riyad Pasha		January 1893	15 April 1894	
Hussein Fakhry Pasha		15 April 1894	28 October 1906	
Saad Pasha Zaghloul		28 October 1906	23 February 1910	
Ahmed Heshmat Pasha		23 February 1910	5 April 1914	
Ahmed Helmy Pasha		5 April 1914	19 December 1914	
Adly Yakn Pasha		19 December 1914	9 April 1919	
Hussein Roshdy Pasha		9 April 1919	20 May 1919	
Ahmed Ziwar Pasha		20 May 1919	2 June 1919	
Ahmed Talaat Pasha		2 June 1919	20 November 1919	
Yehia Ibrahim Pasha		20 November 1919	21 May 1920	
Mohamed Tawfik Refaat		21 May 1920	16 March 1921	
Gaafar Waly Pasha		16 March 1921	24 December 1921	
Mostafa Maher Pasha		1 March 1922	29 November 1922	
Yahya Ibrahim Pasha		30 November 1922	9 February 1923	
Mohamed Tawfik Pasha		15 March 1923	6 August 1923	
Mohamed Moheb Pasha		6 August 1923	8 August 1923	
Ahmed Zaky Aboulsoud Pasha		12 August 1923	28 January 1924	
Mohamed Said Pasha		28 January 1924	25 October 1924	
Ahmed Maher Pasha		25 October 1924	24 November 1924	
Ahmed Khashaba Bey		24 November 1924	13 March 1925	
Aly Maher Pasha		13 March 1925	7 June 1926	
Aly Al Shamsy Pasha		7 June 1926	25 June 1928	
Ahmed Lotfy Al Sayed Pasha		25 June 1928	3 October 1929	
Hafez Hassan Pasha		3 October 1929	1 January 1930	
Bahey El Din Barakat Pasha		1 January 1930	19 June 1930	
Ali Maher Pasha	علي ماهر باشا	19 June 1930	4 January 1933	
Ibrahim Fahmy Karim Pasha	إبراهيم فهمي باشا	4 January 1933	27 September 1933	
Mohamed Helmy Issa Pasha	محمد حلمي عيسى باشا	27 September 1933	14 November 1934	
Ahmed Naguib Al Helaly Pasha		14 November 1934	30 January 1936	
Mohamed Aly Olouba Pasha	محمد علي علوبة	30 January 1936	9 May 1936	
Aly Zaky Al Oraby Pasha		9 May 1936	1 August 1937	
Abdel Salam Fahmy Gomaa		1 August 1937	30 December 1937	
Bahey El Din Barakat	بهي الدين بركات باشا	30 December 1937	27 April 1938	
Mohamed Hussein Heikal	محمد حسين هيكل	27 April 1938	18 August 1939	
Mahmoud Fahmy Al Nokrashy		18 August 1939	27 June 1940	
Mohamed Hussein Heikal	محمد حسين هيكل	27 June 1940	4 February 1942	
Ahmed Naguib Al Helaly		4 February 1942	8 October 1944	
Mohamed Hussein Heikal	محمد حسين هيكل	8 October 1944	15 January 1945	
Abdel Razek Al Sanhoury	عبد الرزاق السنهوري	15 January 1945	15 February 1946	
Mohamed Hassan Al Ashmawy		16 February 1946	9 December 1946	
Abdel Razek Al Sanhoury	عبد الرزاق السنهوري	9 December 1946	25 July 1949	
Ahmed Morsi Badr Bey		25 July 1949	3 November 1949	
Ahmed Hassan Al Ashmawy		3 November 1949	12 January 1950	
Taha Hussein	طه حسين	12 January 1950	27 January 1952	
Abdel Khaleq Hassuna Pasha	محمد عبد الخالق السيد	27 January 1952	1 March 1952	
Mohamed Rifat Pasha	محمد رأفت باشا	1 March 1952	2 July 1952	
Mohammed Sami Mazen Bek		2 July 1952	22 July 1952	

=== Followed by Republican era (1952–present) ===
Name		Served from	Served until	Reference
English	Arabic	Served from	Served until	Reference
Mohamed Rifat Pasha	محمد رأفت باشا	22 July 1952	23 July 1952	
Saad Al-Labban	سعد اللباني	24 July 1952	8 September 1952	
Ismail Al-Qabbani	إسماعيل القباس	8 September 1952	3 January 1954	
Abbas Mustafa Ammar	عباس مصطفى	3 January 1954	17 April 1954	
Mohamed Awad Mohamed	محمد عوض محمد	17 April 1954	31 August 1954	
Kamal El Din Hussein	كمال الدين حسين	31 August 1954	7 October 1958	
Kamal El Din Hussein (Central Ministry) - Ahmed Naguib Hashem (Executive Council)	كمال الدين حسين (الوزارة المركزية) - أحمد نجيب هشام (المجلس التنفيذي)	7 October 1958	16 August 1961	
Mohamed Youssef	محمد يوسف	16 August 1961	18 June 1967	
Abdul Aziz Al Sayed	عبدالعزيز السيد	19 June 1967	20 March 1968	
Mohamed Helmy Murad	محمد حلمي مراد	20 March 1968	10 July 1969	
Mohamed Hafez Ghanem	محمد حافظ غنيم	10 July 1969	17 January 1972	
Ali Abdel Razek	علي عبد الرازق	17 January 1972	25 April 1974	
Mustafa Kamal Helmy	مصطفى كمال حلمي	25 April 1974	5 October 1978	
Hassan Mohammed Ismail	حسن محمد إسماعيل	5 October 1978	19 June 1979	
Mustafa Kamal Helmy	مصطفى كمال حلمي	19 June 1979	5 June 1984	
Abdul Salam Abdul Ghaffar	عبد السلام عبد الغفار	16 July 1984	5 September 1985	
Mansour Ibrahim Hussein	منصور إبراهيم حسن	5 September 1985	9 November 1986	
Ahmed Fathy Sorour	أحمد فتحي سرور	11 November 1986	14 October 1993	
Hussein Kamel Bahaeddin	حسين كامل بهاء الدين	14 October 1993	9 July 2004	
Ahmed Gamal El-Din Moussa	أحمد جمال الدين موسى	9 July 2004	2 December 2005	
Yousry El-Gamal	يسري الجمل	2 December 2005	2 January 2010	
Ahmed Zaki Badreldin	أحمد زكي بدر	2 January 2010	26 January 2011	
Ahmed Gamal El-Din Moussa	أحمد جمال الدين موسى	1 Fub 2011	December 2011	
Gamal El-Araby	جمال العربي	7 December 2011	July 2012	
Ibrahim Ghoneim	إبراهيم غنيم	2 August 2012	16 July 2013	
Mahmoud Abo El-Nasr	محمد أبو النصر	16 July 2013	5 Mar 2015	
Moheb Al-Rafei	محب كامل الرفاعي	5 Mar 2015	12 December 2015	
Al-Hilali El-Sherbini	الهلالي الشربيني	19 December 2015	16 Fub 2017	
Tarek Shawki	طارق شوقي	16 Fub 2017	13 August 2022	
Reda Hegazy	رضا حجازي	13 August 2022	2 July 2024	
Mohamed Abdel Latif	محمد عبد اللطيف	3 July 2024		

== See also ==
- Cabinet of Egypt
