= Education minister =

Government position, in charge of education matters

An education minister (sometimes minister of education) is a position in the governments of some countries responsible for dealing with educational matters. Where known, the government department, ministry, or agency that develops policy and delivers services relating to sports are listed; overseen by and responsible to the education minister. The first such ministry ever is considered to be the Commission of National Education (Polish: Komisja Edukacji Narodowej, Lithuanian: Edukacinė komisija) founded in 1773 in the Polish–Lithuanian Commonwealth.

== Country-related articles and lists ==
Minister of Education may refer to:

=== Albania ===
- Ministry of Education, Sports and Youth (Albanian: Ministria e Arsimit, Sportit dhe Rinisë)

=== Argentina ===
- Minister of Education (Argentina) (Spanish: Ministerio de Educación)

=== Australia ===
- Minister for Education (Australia)
  - Develops policy and delivers services via the Department of Education, Employment and Workplace Relations
- Minister for Education (Victoria)

=== Bangladesh ===
- Minister of Education (Bengali: বাংলাদেশের শিক্ষামন্ত্রী)
  - Responsible for secondary, vocational and tertiary education in Bangladesh.
- Ministry of Primary and Mass Education (Bengali: প্রাথমিক ও গণশিক্ষা মন্ত্রণালয়)
  - Responsible for Primary (Class I–VIII) and Mass (literacy) education in Bangladesh.

=== Brazil ===
- Minister of Education (Brazil)
  - Develops policy and delivers services via the Ministry of Education (Brazil) (Portuguese: Ministério da Educação)

=== Brunei ===
- Minister of Education (Brunei)
  - Develops policy and delivers services via the Ministry of Education (Brunei) (Malay: Kementerian Pendidikan)

=== Bhutan ===
- Ministry of Education (Bhutan)

=== Canada ===
- Minister for Alberta Education
  - Develops policy and delivers services via Alberta Education
- Minister for Education and Child Care (British Columbia)
- Minister for Education (New Brunswick)
  - Develops policy and delivers services via the Department of Education (New Brunswick)
- Minister of Advanced Education and Skills (Newfoundland and Labrador)
  - Develops policy and delivers services via the Department of Advanced Education and Skills (Newfoundland and Labrador)
- Minister of Education (Nova Scotia)
  - Develops policy and delivers services via the Nova Scotia Department of Education
- Minister of Education (Ontario)
  - Develops policy and delivers services via the Ministry of Education (Ontario) (French: Ministère de l'Éducation)
- Minister for Education, Recreation and Sports (Quebec)
  - Develops policy and delivers services via the Ministry of Education, Recreation and Sports (Quebec) (French: Ministère de l’Éducation, du Loisir et du Sport

Note: Canada does not have an Education Minister at the federal government level as education is a provincial responsibility.

=== Chile ===
- Minister of Education (Chile)
  - Develops policy and delivers services via the Ministry of Education (Chile) (Spanish: Ministerio de Educación)

=== China ===
- Minister of Education (China)
  - Develops policy and delivers services via the Ministry of Education of the People's Republic of China (simplified Chinese: 中华人民共和国教育部; traditional Chinese: 中華人民共和國教育部; pinyin: Zhōnghuá Rénmín Gònghéguó Jiàoyùbù)

==== Hong Kong ====
- Secretary for Education (Hong Kong)
  - Develops policy and delivers services via the Education Bureau (Chinese: 教育局)

=== Croatia ===
- Minister of Science, Education and Sports (Croatia)
  - Develops policy and delivers services via the Ministry of Science, Education and Sports (Croatia) (Croatian: Ministarstvo obrazovanja, znanosti i sporta)

=== Cuba ===
- Ministry of Education (Cuba)

=== Denmark ===
- Minister of Children and Education (Denmark) (Danish: Børne- og Undervisningsminister)
  - Develops policy and delivers services via the Danish Ministry of Education
- Minister for Research, Innovation and Higher Education (Denmark)
  - Develops policy and delivers services via Universities in Denmark

=== Egypt ===
- Minister of Education of Egypt
  - Develops policy and delivers services via the Ministry of Education (Egypt) (Arabic: وزارة التربية والتعليم)

=== Estonia ===
- Minister of Education and Research (Estonia)
  - Develops policy and delivers services via the Ministry of Education and Research (Estonian: Eesti Vabariigi Haridus- ja Teadusministeerium)

=== Fiji ===
- Minister for Education, Heritage and Arts (Fiji)
  - Develops policy and delivers services via the Ministry of Education, Heritage and Arts (Fiji)

=== Finland ===
- Minister of Education (Finland) (Finnish: opetusministeri, Swedish: undervisningsminister)

=== France ===
- Minister of National Education (France)
  - Develops policy and delivers services via the Ministry of National Education (France) (French: Ministère de l’Éducation nationale, de la Jeunesse et de la Vie associative)

=== Germany ===
- Federal Minister of Education and Research (Germany)
  - Develops policy and delivers services via the Federal Ministry of Education and Research (Germany) (German: Bundesministerium für Bildung und Forschung, BMBF)

=== Greece ===
- Minister of Education, Lifelong Learning and Religious Affairs (Greece)
  - Develops policy and delivers services via the Ministry of Education, Lifelong Learning and Religious Affairs (Greece) (Greek: Υπουργείο Παιδείας, Δια Βίου Μάθησης και Θρησκευμάτων)

=== Hungary ===
- Minister of Human Resources of Hungary
  - Develops policy and delivers services via the Ministry of Human Resources (Hungary)

=== Iceland ===
- Minister of Education, Science and Culture (Iceland)
  - Develops policy and delivers services via the Ministry of Education, Science and Culture (Iceland) (Icelandic: Mennta- og menningarmálaráðuneytið)

=== Indonesia ===
- Minister of Primary and Secondary (Indonesia)
  - Develops policy and delivers services via the Ministry Primary and Secondary of Education (Indonesia) (Indonesian: Kementerian Pendidikan Dasar dan Menengah or Kemendikdasmen)
- Minister of Higher Education, Science, and Technology (Indonesia)
  - Develops policy and delivers services via the Ministry of Higher Education (Indonesia) (Indonesian: Kementerian Pendidikan Tinggi, Sains, dan Teknologi or Kemendiktisaintek)

=== Iran ===
- Ministry of Education (Persian: وزارت آموزش و پرورش جمهوری اسلامی ایران, romanized: Vezârat-e Âmôzesh vâ Parvâresh-e Jomhuri-ye Eslâmi-ye Iran, lit. 'Ministry of Teaching and Growing of the Islamic Republic of Iran')
- Ministry of Science, Research and Technology (Persian: وزارت علوم، تحقیقات و فناوری, romanized: Vezārate 'Olum, Tahqiqāt va Fanāvari)

=== India ===
- Minister of Education
  - Develops policy and delivers services via the Ministry of Education (India)

=== Ireland ===
- Minister for Education and Youth
- Minister for Further and Higher Education, Research, Innovation and Science

=== Iraq ===
- Ministry of Education (Iraq)
- Ministry of Higher Education and Scientific Research (Iraq)

=== Isle of Man ===
- Minister for Education and Children (Isle of Man)
  - Develops policy and delivers services via the Department of Education (Isle of Man) (Manx: Rheynn Ynsee)

=== Israel ===
- Ministry of Education (Israel)
  - Develops policy and delivers services via the Ministry of Education (Israel) (Hebrew: משרד החינוך, Misrad HaHinukh; Arabic: وزارة التربية والتعليم)

=== Italy ===
- Minister of Education, University and Research (Italy)

=== Japan ===
- Minister of Education, Culture, Sports, Science and Technology (Japan)
  - Develops policy and delivers services via the Ministry of Education, Culture, Sports, Science and Technology (文部科学省, Monbu-kagaku-shō)

=== Lithuania ===
- Ministry of Education and Science (Lithuania)

=== Malaysia ===
- Minister of Education (Malaysia)
- Minister of Higher Education (Malaysia)

=== Marshall Islands ===
- Ministry of Education (Marshall Islands)

=== Mexico ===
- Secretary of Education (Mexico)
  - Develops policy and delivers services via the Secretariat of Public Education (Spanish: Secretaría de Educación Pública)

=== Moldova ===
- Ministry of Education and Research

=== Netherlands ===
- Minister of Education, Culture and Science (Netherlands)
  - State Secretary for Higher Education, Science and Knowledge, Teachers, Culture
    - Develops policy and delivers services via the Ministry of Education, Culture and Science (Netherlands) (Dutch: Ministerie van Onderwijs, Cultuur en Wetenschappen)

=== New Zealand ===
- Minister of Education (New Zealand)
  - Develops policy and delivers services via the Ministry of Education (New Zealand) (Māori: Te Tāhuhu o te Mātauranga)

=== North Macedonia ===
- Ministry of Education and Science

=== Norway ===
- Minister of Education
- Minister of Research and Higher Education
  - Develops policy and delivers services via the Royal Norwegian Ministry of Education and Research (Norwegian: Kunnskapsdepartementet)

=== Pakistan ===
- Minister for Education (Pakistan)
  - Develops policy and delivers services via the Ministry of Education and Training of Pakistan

=== Peru ===
- Minister of Education (Peru)
  - Develops policy and delivers services via the Ministry of Education (Peru)

=== Philippines ===
- Secretary of Education (Philippines)
  - Develops policy and delivers services via the Department of Education (Philippines)

=== Poland ===
- Minister of National Education (Poland)
  - Develops policy and delivers services via the Ministry of National Education (Poland) (Polish: Ministerstwo Edukacji Narodowej)
- Minister of Science and Higher Education (Poland)
  - Develops policy and delivers services via the Ministry of Science and Higher Education (Poland) (Polish: Ministerstwo Nauki i Szkolnictwa Wyższego)

=== Portugal ===
- Minister for Education (Portugal)
  - Develops policy and delivers services via the Ministry of Education (Portugal) (Portuguese: Ministério da Educação)
- Minister for Science, Technology and Higher Education (Policy)
  - Develops policy and delivers services via the Ministry of Science, Technology and Higher Education (Portugal) (Portuguese: Ministério da Ciência, Tecnologia e Ensino Superior)

=== Romania ===
- Minister of Education, Research, Youth and Sport (Romania)
  - Develops policy and delivers services via the Ministry of Education, Research, Youth and Sport (Romania) (Romanian: Ministerul Educației, Cercetării, Tineretului și Sportului)

=== Singapore ===
- Minister for Education (Singapore)
  - Develops policy and delivers services via the Ministry of Education (Singapore) (Chinese: 新加坡教育部; Malay: Kementerian Pelajaran; Tamil: கல்வி அமைச்சு)

=== Slovakia ===
- Minister for Education, Science and Sport (Slovakia) Ministry of National Education (Slovakia) (Slovak: Ministerstvo školstva, vedy, výskumu a športu)

=== South Africa ===
- Minister of Basic Education (South Africa)
  - Develops policy and delivers services via the Department of Basic Education (South Africa)
- Minister of Higher Education and Training (South Africa)
  - Develops policy and delivers services via the Department of Higher Education and Training (South Africa)

=== Spain ===
- Minister of Education (Spain)
  - Develops policy and delivers services via the Ministry of Education (Spain)

=== Sri Lanka ===
- Minister of Education (Sri Lanka)
  - Develops policy and delivers services via the Ministry of Education (Sri Lanka)
- Minister of Higher Education (Sri Lanka)
  - Develops policy and delivers services via the Ministry of Higher Education (Sri Lanka)

=== Sweden ===
- Minister for Education (Sweden)
  - Develops policy and delivers services via the Ministry of Education and Research (Sweden) (Swedish: Utbildningsdepartementet)

=== Switzerland ===
- Member of the Swiss Federal Council and Head of the Department of Home Affairs
  - Develops policy and delivers services via the Federal Department of Home Affairs (Switzerland) (German: Eidgenössisches Departement des Innern; French: Département fédéral de l'intérieur; Italian: Dipartimento Federale dell'Interno)

=== Thailand ===
- Minister of Education (Thailand)
  - Develops policy and delivers services via the Ministry of Education (Thailand) (Thai: กระทรวงศึกษาธิการ; RTGS: Krasuang Sueksathikan)

=== United Kingdom ===
==== England ====
- Secretary of State for Education
  - Develops policy and delivers services via the Department for Education

==== Northern Ireland ====
- Minister of Education (Northern Ireland)
  - Develops policy and delivers services via the Department of Education (Northern Ireland) (Irish: An Roinn Oideachais; Ulster Scots: Männystrie o Lear or Depairtment o Leir)
  - Minister for the Economy (Northern Ireland)
  - Develops policy, higher and further Education and delivers services via the Department of Economy (Northern Ireland) (Irish: An Roinn Fostaíochta agus Foghlama; Ulster Scots: Depairtment for Employ an Learnin)

==== Scotland ====
- Cabinet Secretary for Education and Skills
  - Develops policy and delivers services via the Scottish Government Learning and Justice Directorates

==== Wales ====
- Cabinet Secretary for Education
  - Develops policy and delivers services via the Department for Education and Skills (Wales) (Welsh: Yr Adran Addysg a Sgiliau)

=== United States ===
- United States Secretary of Education
  - Develops policy and delivers services via the United States Department of Education

=== Uruguay ===
- Minister of Education and Culture (Uruguay)
  - Develops policy and delivers services via the Ministry of Education and Culture (Uruguay)

=== Vietnam ===
- Minister of Education and Training (Vietnam)
  - Develops policy and delivers services via the Ministry of Education and Training (Vietnam)

== See also ==
- Right to science and culture
- Human rights
- Right to education
- Right to an adequate standard of living
- Welfare rights
- Economic, social and cultural rights
- Culture minister
- Cultural genocide
- Ministry of Education
