= Yousry Saber Hussein El-Gamal =

Egyptian politician

HE Dr. Yousry El-Gamal

Minister of Education
- In office 2004 – 3 January 2010
- President: Hosni Mubarak
- Prime Minister: HE Dr. Ahmed Nazif
- Preceded by: Ahmed Gamal El-Din Moussa
- Succeeded by: HE Dr. Ahmed Zaki Badr

Personal details
- Born: Yousry Saber Hussein El-Gamal; 1947 (age 78–79)

Yousry Saber Hussein El-Gamal is a former Minister of Education for Egypt. He was replaced on 3 January 2010 by Dr. Ahmed Zaki Badr.

Government offices
Preceded by Ahmed Gamal El-Din Moussa	Minister of Education –2010	Succeeded by Ahmed Zaki Badreldin
