= Mohamed Abdel Latif =

Egyptian politician (born 1972)

- محمد عبداللطيف
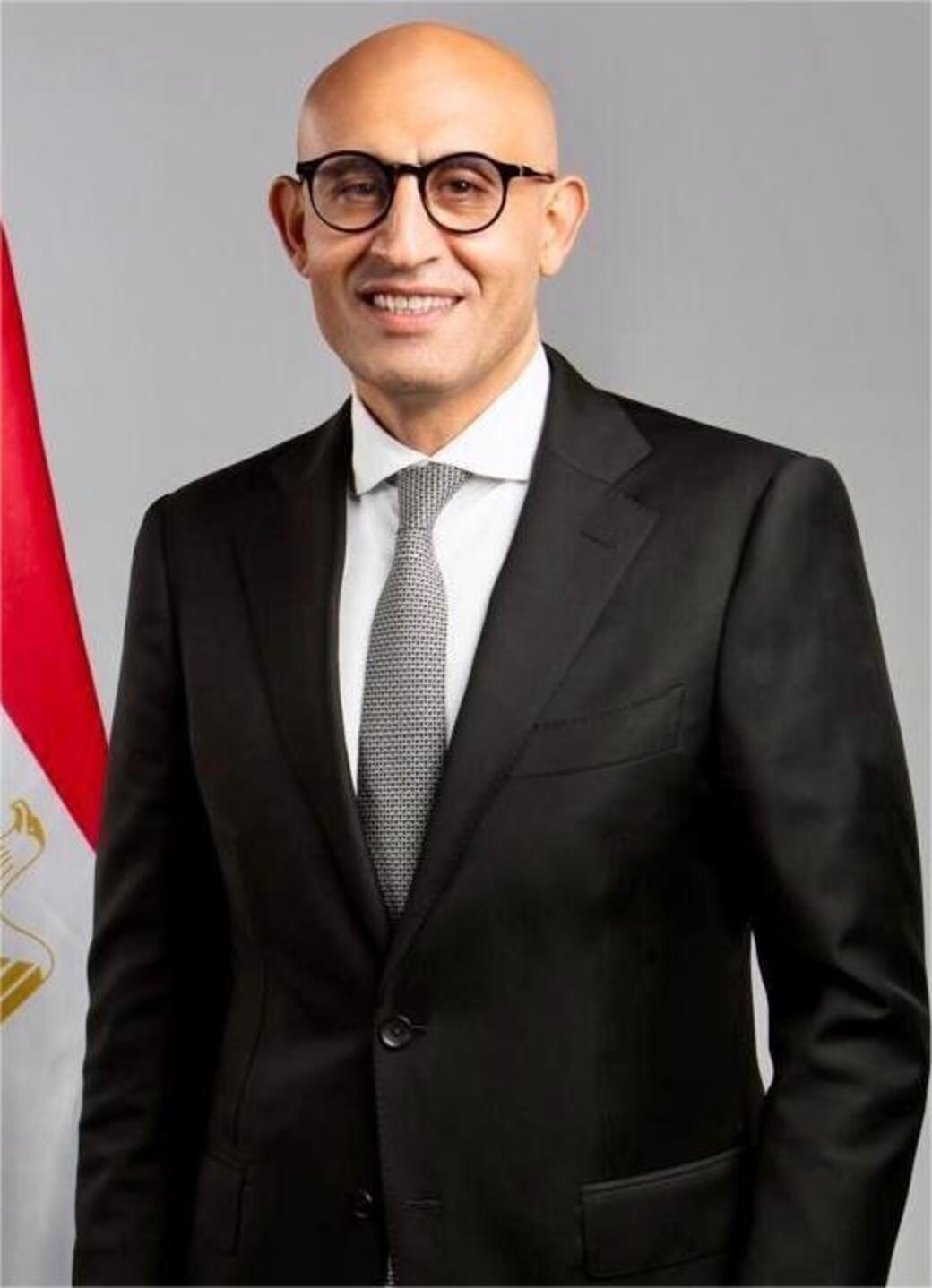
- Official portrait, 2025

Minister of Education
- Incumbent
- Assumed office 3 July 2024
- President: Abdel Fattah el-Sisi
- Prime Minister: Mostafa Madbouly
- Preceded by: Reda Hegazy

Personal details
- Born: 20 June 1972 (age 54) Cairo, Egypt
- Relations: Ahmad Ismail Ali (grandfather)
- Parent(s): Ahmed Abdel Latif (father); Nermine Ismail (mother)

Mohamed Ahmed Abdel Latif (Arabic: محمد أحمد عبد اللطيف; born 20 June 1972) is an Egyptian educational administrator who has served as the Minister of Education of Egypt in the cabinet of Prime Minister Mostafa Madbouly's second Ministry since 3 July 2024.

== Early life ==
Abdel Latif was born in Cairo, Egypt in June 1972. He is the son of Nermien Ismail, founder and owner of Nermein Ismail Schools (NIS). Through his mother, he is the grandson of Field Marshal Ahmad Ismail Ali, Egypt's Minister of War and Commander-in-Chief during the October 1973 War.

== Career ==
Abdel Latif is an educational leader with nearly three decades of experience in school management, institutional development, and education reform. Prior to entering government, he held senior leadership roles within the private education sector, most notably overseeing the expansion and academic performance of Nermien Ismail Schools, a network employing more than 3,500 educators and administrators.

His work in the sector has focused on improving instructional quality, strengthening institutional governance, and promoting evidence-based planning. Abdel Latif has conducted field visits to more than 400 schools across Egypt and over 150 schools internationally, including in Japan, Denmark, Germany, Spain, and the United States. These engagements have shaped his approach to benchmarking global education practices and adapting them to national priorities.

== Minister of Education and Technical Education (2024–present) ==
Abdel Latif was appointed Minister of Education and Technical Education on 3 July 2024. Since assuming office, he has led a reform agenda centered on improving learning conditions, strengthening educational quality, and modernizing system governance. His first year focused on operational measures aimed at addressing classroom overcrowding, teacher distribution, school attendance, foundational learning, and secondary-level ICT integration.

=== Reform Achievements, 2024–2025 ===
Initiatives undertaken during his inaugural ministerial year include:

- Reducing classroom density nationwide through the addition of 98,744 classrooms. This lowered the national average to 38 students per class, with a maximum cap of 49 students, and left only 22 schools out of 55,000 with persistent overcrowding.
- Eliminating teacher shortages in core subjects through redistribution and revised instructional-hour planning.
- Increasing the number of weekly instructional hours.
- Improving student attendance monitoring across all school stages.
- Expanding ICT integration at the general secondary level.
- Establishing a Quality Assurance Unit within the Ministry.

These efforts were positioned within international benchmarks, where average class sizes range from 30 to 50 students in China and around 38 students in Japan, according to OECD and sectoral publications.

== See also ==
- Tareq Shawki
- First Madbouly Cabinet
