= Ismail al-Qabbani =

Egyptian politician (1898–1963)

Ismail Mahmoud al-Qabbani
- Born: 1898; Asyut Governorate, Egypt
- Died: 1963 (aged 64–65)
- Occupation: Minister of Education
- Known for: Educational reform

Ismail al-Qabbani (Arabic: إسماعيل القباني; born in 1898 in Asyut Governorate–1963) was an Egyptian reforming educationalist. He introduced to the Egyptian education system the concept of Pragmatism. He was also convinced that education in Egypt should be indigenous and rooted in Egyptian and Arabic culture. He became Dean of the Institute of Education. He established the Journal of Modern Education in 1948 and later became Minister for Education.

== See also ==
- Education in Egypt
- Ali Pasha Mubarak
