= Ahmed Zaki Badreldin =

Egyptian politician

Ahmed Zaki Badr

Minister of Education
- In office January 2010 – 2011
- Preceded by: Yousry El Gamal
- Succeeded by: Ahmed Gamal El Din Moussa

Personal details
- Education: Ain Shams University; University of Nantes

Ahmed Zaki Badr is a former Minister of Education for Egypt.

== Early life and education ==
Badr is the son of the former minister of interior in Egypt, Zaki Badr. He received his Bachelor of Science degree in engineering from Ain Shams University in 1982. He then obtained Master of Science degree again from Ain Shams University in 1986. He also received his PhD from University of Nantes, France in 1990.

== Career ==
Badr was appointed minister of education on 3 January 2010. His appointment was not welcomed by the Muslim Brotherhood. During his term, his activities led to protests. Badr was replaced by Ahmed El Din in 2011. At the end of 2011 he began to serve as the president of the Akhbar El Youm Academy.

Government offices
Preceded by Yousry El-Gamal	Minister of Education; 2010-2011	Succeeded by Ahmed Gamal El Din Moussa
