= Hussein Kamel Bahaeddin =

Egyptian paediatrician and politician (1932–2016)

- حسين كامل بهاء الدين

Minister of Education
- In office May 1991 – 13 July 2004
- President: Hosni Mubarak
- Prime Minister: Atef Sedki; Kamal Ganzouri; Atef Ebeid
- Vice President: Omar Suleiman
- Preceded by: Ahmad Fathi Sorour
- Succeeded by: Ahmed Gamal El-Din Moussa

Ministry of Higher Education
- In office May 1991 – 1997
- President: Hosni Mubarak
- Prime Minister: Atef Sedki; Kamal Ganzouri
- Vice President: Omar Suleiman

Personal details
- Born: 18 September 1932 Zagazig, Sharqia Governorate, Egypt
- Died: 29 July 2016 (aged 83)
- Party: National Democratic Party
- Education: Cairo University (MBBS, MD)
- Awards: Child Health Foundation Fellowship, WHO (1989); Order of the Republic (2006)
- Scientific career
- Workplaces: Cairo University

Hussein Kamel Bahaeddin (Arabic: حسين كامل بهاء الدين, 18 September 1932 – 29 July 2016) was an Egyptian professor of paediatrics and Minister of Education between 1991 and 2004. During his tenure as Minister of Education, Bahaeddin implemented reforms, such as extending compulsory education, banning school corporal punishment, and increasing university entrance opportunities. He advocated for addressing poverty and malnutrition to improve academic outcomes and emphasised democratic practices in education. His leadership also oversaw the construction of the Bibliotheca Alexandrina. Bahaeddin incited controversy over certain measures, including religious and political reforms.

== Biography ==
=== Early life and education ===
Hussein Kamel Bahaeddin was born on 18 September 1932 in Zagazig, Sharqia Governorate, Egypt, to a mother (Mona) who converted in 1943 from Christianity to Islam before meeting Bahaeddin's father (Kamel) in London.

Bahaeddin received his Bachelor of Medicine and Surgery in 1954 and then a doctorate in paediatrics from Cairo University in 1959. He was elected secretary of the Egyptian Youth Organisation in 1965 and held the position until 1968.

=== Medical career ===
In 1962, Bahaeddin joined the Faculty of Medicine, Cairo University, as a lecturer and, in 1973, he was promoted to professor of paediatrics. He then assumed the positions of head of the paediatric department and director of the new university children's hospital, both of which he held from 1983 to 1991.

Bahaeddin was a member of the Egyptian Scientific Academy, and in 1989, he assumed the presidency of the Egyptian Society of Paediatrics, a position he held until 2016.

=== Ministry of Education ===
As part of Atef Sedki Cabinet, Bahaeddin became the Minister of Education in May 1991, replacing Ahmad Fathi Sorour, who became the Speaker of the People's Assembly of Egypt. He was also the Minister of Higher Education until 1997, when the two ministries were separated.

During his tenure between 1991 and 2004, Bahaeddin introduced a series of reforms aimed at modernising the education system. He promoted a shift from rote memorisation to active learning methodologies, emphasising student participation in the learning process. Under his leadership, the Ministry supported decentralisation initiatives, the establishment of school boards of trustees, and increased community involvement in education. Bahaeddin also framed basic education as a national priority, particularly in response to concerns about ideological influence in schools. Additionally, Bahaeddin oversaw projects to integrate technology into teaching and teacher training, notably through the USAID-funded Integrated English Language Program. While these reforms reflected international education policy trends, their implementation faced structural and political challenges, limiting their overall effectiveness.

Between 1992 and 1997, Bahaeddin oversaw the construction of the Bibliotheca Alexandrina. In 1998, Bahaeddin passed a decree that would punish any student proven to have assaulted a teacher with final dismissal.

Also during his tenure, he extended compulsory education to six years and prohibited corporal punishment, even in private schools. Bahaeddin justified his decision to ban corporal punishment in schools by arguing, based on his background as a paediatrician, that any form of physical or emotional abuse severely harms students’ psychological and cognitive development, undermines the purpose of education, and risks alienating children from the learning process entirely. However, a 1998 study found that corporal punishment was still being used extensively by teachers in Egypt to punish behaviour they regarded as unacceptable. Around 80 per cent of boys and 60 per cent of girls were punished by teachers using their hands, sticks, straps, shoes, punches, and kicks as the most common administration methods. The most commonly reported injuries were bumps and contusions.

Bahaeddin removed the restriction on the number of General Secondary Education Certificate exams students could take for university entrance, which was previously limited to one. He believed that poverty and malnutrition were responsible for the low average academic level of students, and this step would, first, eliminate the fear of the National Secondary Exam. Second, the students who did not receive private lessons would be compensated because "repetition ensures improving performance". However, repeating the exam required paying the exam fees.

Following Prime Minister Atef Ebeid's resignation on 9 July 2004 and a cabinet reshuffle led by the new Prime Minister Ahmed Nazif, Bahaeddin was replaced by Ahmed Gamal El-Din Moussa as the new Minister of Education on 13 July 2024. By the end of his tenure, Bahaeddin helped build 16,000 schools, implemented programs to train more than 15,000 teachers nationally and internationally, and helped close the educational gender gap.

==== State control and political interventions under Bahaeddin ====
During his tenure as minister, in 1994, Bahaeddin tried to pass a rule that would have prohibited schoolgirls from donning the hijab unless their parents provided a letter of consent to the school. However, the decree was withdrawn due to public outcry over the measure, which was seen by some as part of a systematic campaign against Islamists and the Muslim Brotherhood in Egypt.

Bahaeddin often expressed his opinion that democracy is important and that, in his view, instructors should be supported in engaging pupils in more democratic practices. A workshop on using democratic instruments in the classroom was conducted by the Group for Democratic Development (GDD) in 1999 for Upper-Egyptian teachers. The Education Ministry received the GDD's findings and an offer from the GDD to assist the ministry in more training sessions. However, close to 30 workshop attendees were held at the State Security Office for up to 24 hours. The Ministry of Education then docked 15 days of each participant's monthly salary and accused them of teaching homosexuality and atheism. Later, political science professor Glenn E. Perry wrote that "Contrary to the widespread image of an authentic process of democratisation under Hosni Mubarak, he has kept the authoritarian regime intact."

In 2003, Bahaeddin defended the government's control over education by arguing that doing so would prevent "enculturation and socialisation" of the state and promote national harmony, as – according to Bahaeddin – the military, economy, and political spheres all have a stake in education as a matter of national security. However, following the 2011 Egyptian revolution, which included the removal of Egyptian President Hosni Mubarak and the disbandment of the ruling National Democratic Party (NDP), the Ministry of Education removed over 20 percent of the instructional materials that were focused on the legacies of the NDP from the national curricula.

In 2004, the Ministry of Education dismissed a number of educators whom it alleged had pro-Islamic leanings. Bahaeddin said the decision was made after receiving information from the ministry managers and security personnel and complaints from the pupils' parents. These efforts were considered part of US-led initiatives to combat terrorism. According to Bahaeddin, the government decision was not made in reaction to US demands for reforms that the Gulf News said would "eliminate a climate that Washington considers as helping to breed terrorism". As part of the "New Basic Education Bilateral Agreement" with the US, which would go on to provide $64 million USD for education reform in Egypt, these reforms included the removal of Quranic verses and the sayings of the Prophet Mohammed from school texts, and education on respecting and understanding other cultures. Overall, USAID donated more than US$765 million to Egypt between 1975 and 2004.

=== Personal life and death ===
Bahaeddin married Samiha Abdel Salam Soliman on 3 February 1966. He died on 29 July 2016.

== Awards and honours ==
Bahaeddin was awarded the Child Health Foundation Fellowship by the Ihsan Doğramacı Family Health Foundation in 1989. He was elected a Fellow of the Royal College of Physicians and Surgeons in 1993, and an honorary member of the American Academy of Pediatrics in 2010. He received an Honorary Doctorate of Science from the University of Glasgow, Hacettepe University and the University of East Anglia in 1997, and from St. Olaf College in 1999.

In 2006, Bahaeddin received the Egyptian Order of the Republic (First Class), and the Centennial Award of the International Pediatric Federation in 2010. In 2008, he was elected honorary president of the International Society of Tropical Paediatrics. In 2009, he became a member of the International Children's Institute (ICC), Ankara, and was elected in the same year as honorary president.

Hussein Kamel Bahaeddin Primary School in Alexandria was named posthumously after him.

== Bibliography ==
- Bahaeddin, Hussein Kamel (1999). التعليم والمستقبل [Education and the Future] (in Arabic). Al Maaref Foundation for Printing and Publishing. ISBN 978-977-02-5476-9.
- Bahaeddin, Hussein Kamel (2000). الوطنية في عالم بلا هوية: تحديات العولمة [Patriotism In A World Without Identity: The Challenges Of Globalization] (in Arabic). Al Maaref Foundation for Printing and Publishing. ISBN 978-977-02-5977-1.
- Bahaeddin, Hussein Kamel (2003). مفترق طرق [Crossroads] (in Arabic). Al Maaref Foundation for Printing and Publishing. ISBN 9770187976.
- Bahaeddin, Hussein Kamel (2017). رسالة من الزمن القــادم [A message from the future] (in Arabic). Nahdet Misr. ISBN 978-9771446989.
