= Education in Egypt =

Education in Egypt is compulsory for nine academic years, from ages 4 to 14, and the constitution guarantees free education at all levels in government-run schools and public universities. There are no formal admissions requirements for enrollment in public elementary schools. Although public education is technically free, these schools still impose small fees. These fees can range from 210 to 520 Egyptian pounds (approximately US$5–10) per year, though they are waived for some low-income students. The public education system in Egypt is structured into three levels. The basic education stage serves children aged 4 to 14 and includes kindergarten for two years, followed by primary school for six years and preparatory school for three years. This is followed by the secondary education stage, which lasts three years for students aged 15 to 17, leading to the tertiary level (also called higher education or post-secondary education).

Egypt observes a Friday-Saturday weekend, with the majority of schools operating from Sunday to Thursday. However, some private institutions may follow a different schedule, like Saturday to Wednesday. In addition to official state holidays, both religious and secular, the academic calendar includes two primary vacation periods. Summer vacation typically commences in early to mid-June and extends until approximately mid-September, while winter vacation spans from mid-January to early February.

Egypt has achieved near-universal primary school enrollment, while secondary school enrollment reached 86% in 2021.

The overall literacy rate in Egypt was 72 percent as of 2010, with a gender breakdown of 80.3 percent for males and 63.5 percent for females. Both the government and various NGOs have placed significant emphasis on reducing gender disparities in education and on achieving the 2015 Millennium Development Goal of universal primary education.

With support from the World Bank and other multilateral organizations, Egypt aims to expand early childhood education and integrate Information and Communication Technology (ICT) at all levels, particularly in higher education. Public expenditure on education accounts for 5.3% of total spending as of fiscal year 2024/2025.

The Human Rights Measurement Initiative reports that Egypt achieves 65.5% of what should be possible for the right to education, relative to its income level.

== History ==
=== Antiquity ===
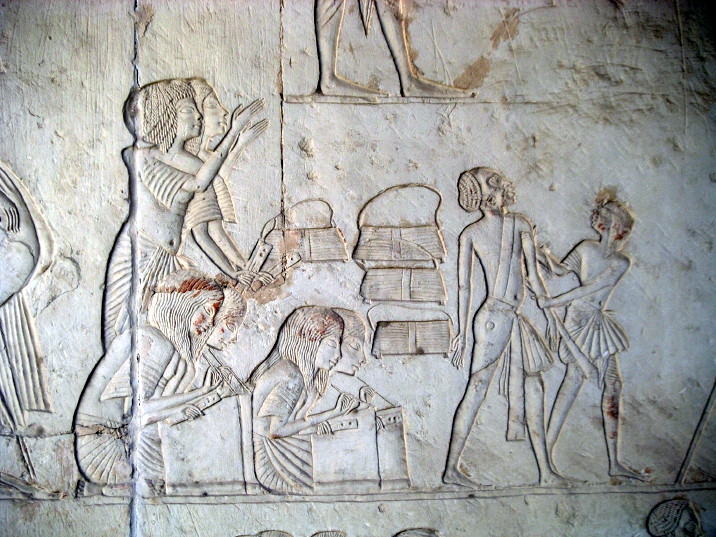
Relief from Horemheb's tomb showing scribes writing under dictation

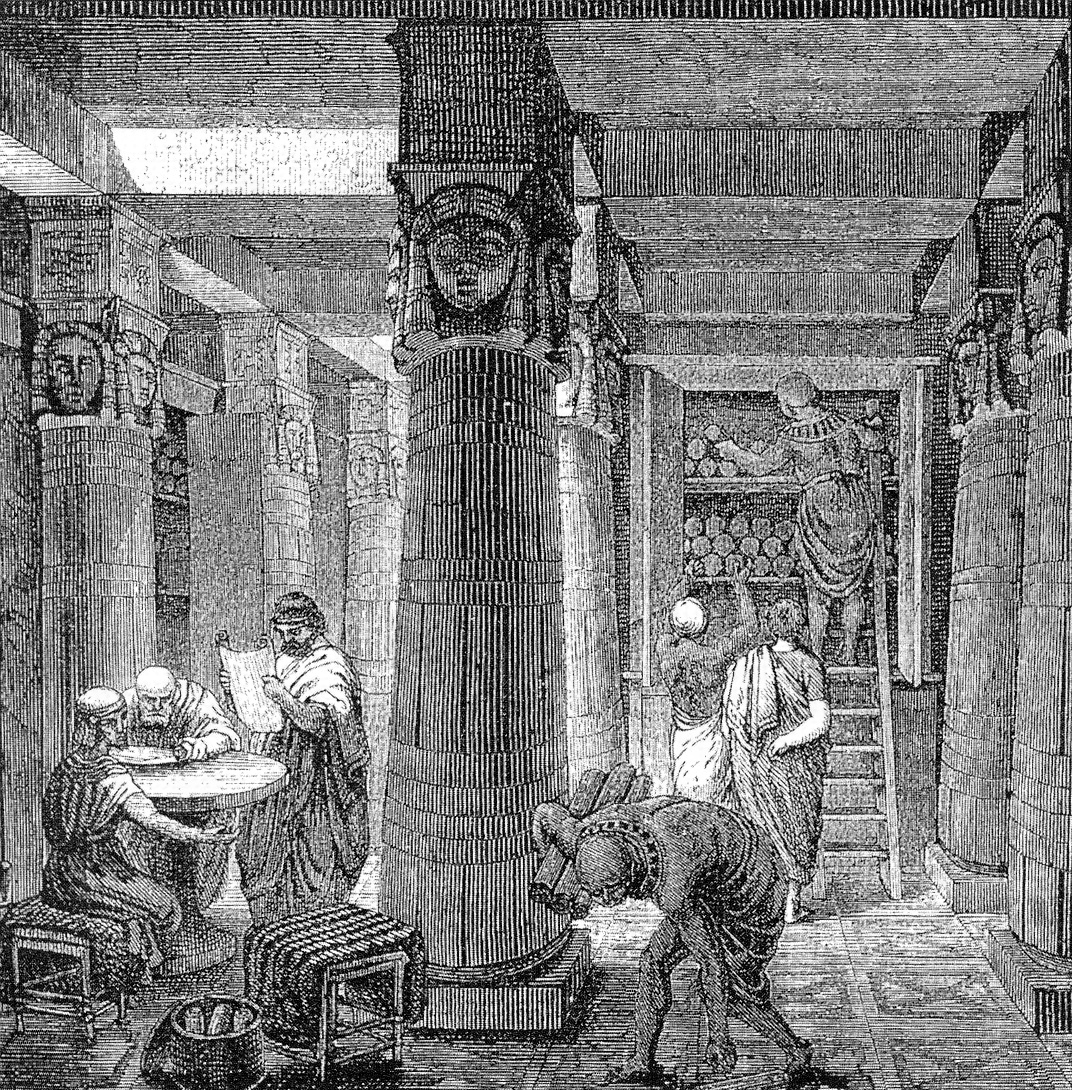
19th-century artistic rendering of the Library of Alexandria

Education in Egypt has a long and distinguished history, dating back to ancient times. The ancient Egyptians, credited with the invention of writing, recorded their language using hieroglyphs and established "Bar Ankh" (House of Life), the first known school and library in human history. Students from various social backgrounds were enrolled at an early age, typically between five and ten years old. During the Coptic periods educational institutions became affiliated with churches instead of temples, leading to the establishment of the Theological School in Alexandria. Egypt served as an educational and intellectual center, attracting scholars from beyond its borders and contributing to advancements in various fields, including science, literature, and the arts.

The city of Alexandria housed a university dating back to 300 BCE, which became a hub for notable scholars such as Archimedes and Euclid. Lectures were delivered in a structured manner, resembling the academic systems of modern universities.

=== Medieval Egypt ===
During the Fatimid period, two key institutions emerged in Cairo that would shape the intellectual trajectory of Islamic education: al-Azhar and the Dar al-Ilm. Al-Azhar was founded in 970–972 CE under the direction of Jawhar al-Siqilli following the Fatimid conquest of Egypt, initially serving as a congregational mosque before developing into a leading center for the study of Shi‘a jurisprudence and theology. While it later became a Sunni institution, al-Azhar’s early educational character was informal, revolving around the presence of scholars who attracted students through their reputation and mastery. In contrast, the Dar al-Ilm (also known as the House of Knowledge), established in 1005 CE by Caliph al-Hakim bi-Amr Allah, was conceived as a state-sponsored center of higher learning and public access. It combined the functions of a library, academy, and scholarly forum, offering instruction in diverse fields such as astronomy, medicine, grammar, and theology. The institution was notable for its accessibility, salaried teachers, and vast manuscript collection, reportedly exceeding 100,000 volumes, including 18,000 manuscripts on early civilizations. Although both al-Azhar and Dar al-Ilm were shaped by the religious and political priorities of the Fatimid regime, the former endured and evolved, while the latter, despite its early prominence, was eventually dismantled amidst political instability.

Education during the Ayyubid and Mamluk periods (c. 12th–16th centuries) remained characterized by a decentralized and socially embedded structure of knowledge transmission. Instruction was primarily informal and rooted in interpersonal relationships between scholars and students. The prevailing method of certification was the ijāza, a license granted by a scholar authorizing a student to teach or transmit specific texts. Teaching did not take place within a formal institutional framework but occurred in a variety of locations, including mosques, private residences, and public spaces such as markets and courtyards. While madrasas were present and often endowed through religious foundations, they did not constitute the principal mechanism of education. Their pedagogical role was frequently limited, and they functioned more as instruments of social prestige and political patronage than as centers of sustained instruction.

Scholars operated within networks shaped by both scholarly reputation and political influence. Appointments to positions within madrasas or to judicial and administrative posts were often contingent upon social connections, particularly under the Mamluk regime, where military elites played a significant role in sponsoring religious learning. These elites increasingly engaged in the educational sphere to reinforce their legitimacy and participate in the moral governance of society.

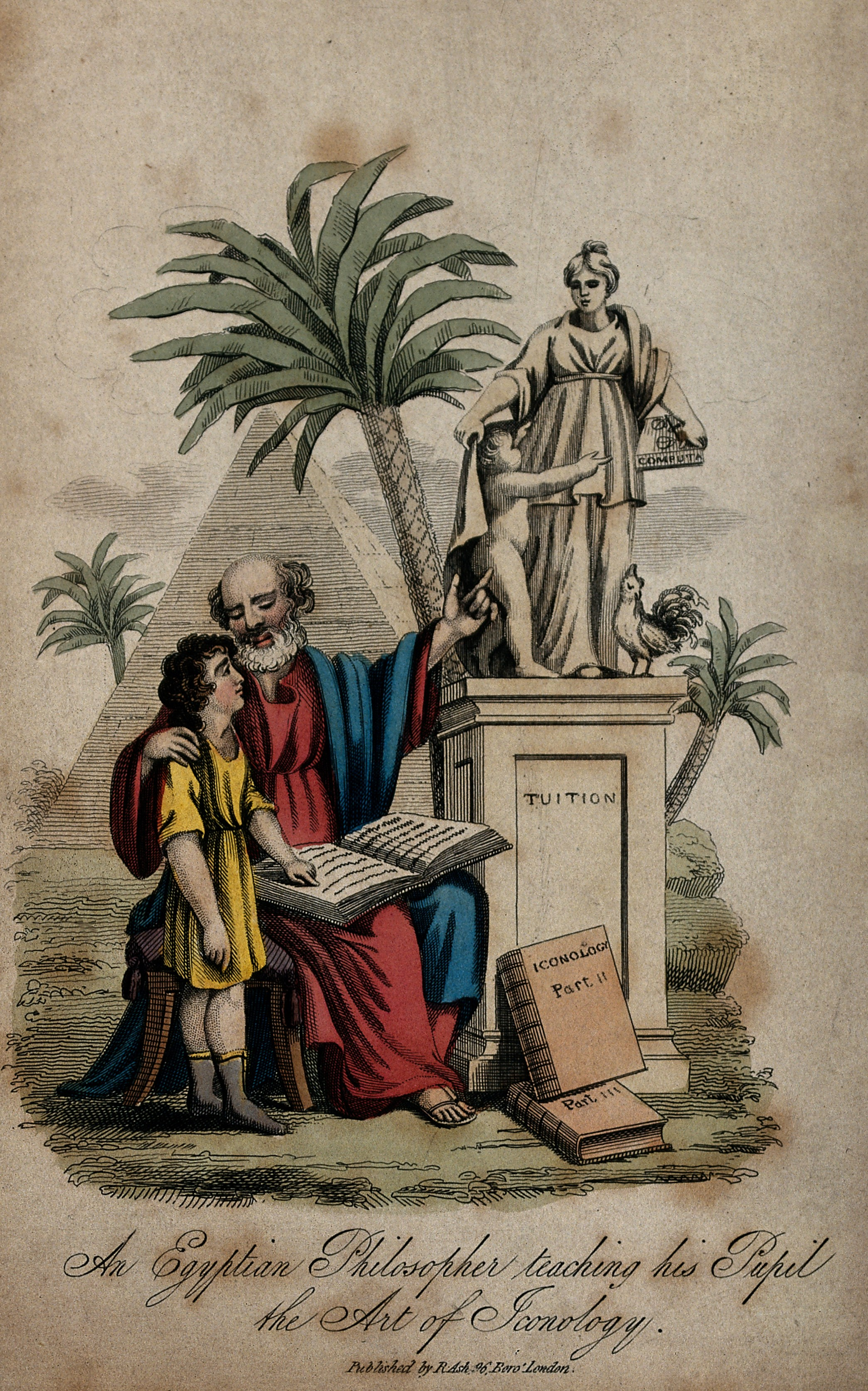
An Egyptian philosopher teaching his student

Women’s participation in education, while restricted by prevailing norms, was not entirely absent. Some women were active in the transmission of hadith and attended scholarly gatherings, while others contributed through the endowment of educational and religious institutions. Documentation also indicates a degree of literacy among elite women, suggesting their involvement in the intellectual life of the time, albeit in limited and often informal capacities.

Educational engagement extended across social strata. Members of the urban middle and lower classes, including artisans and tradesmen, sought religious instruction to fulfill communal roles, gain moral authority, or pursue upward mobility. The widespread availability of informal instruction made it possible for individuals without elite backgrounds to access learning. This mode of education emphasized oral transmission and personal authority rather than standardized curricula or formal assessment.

=== French expedition ===
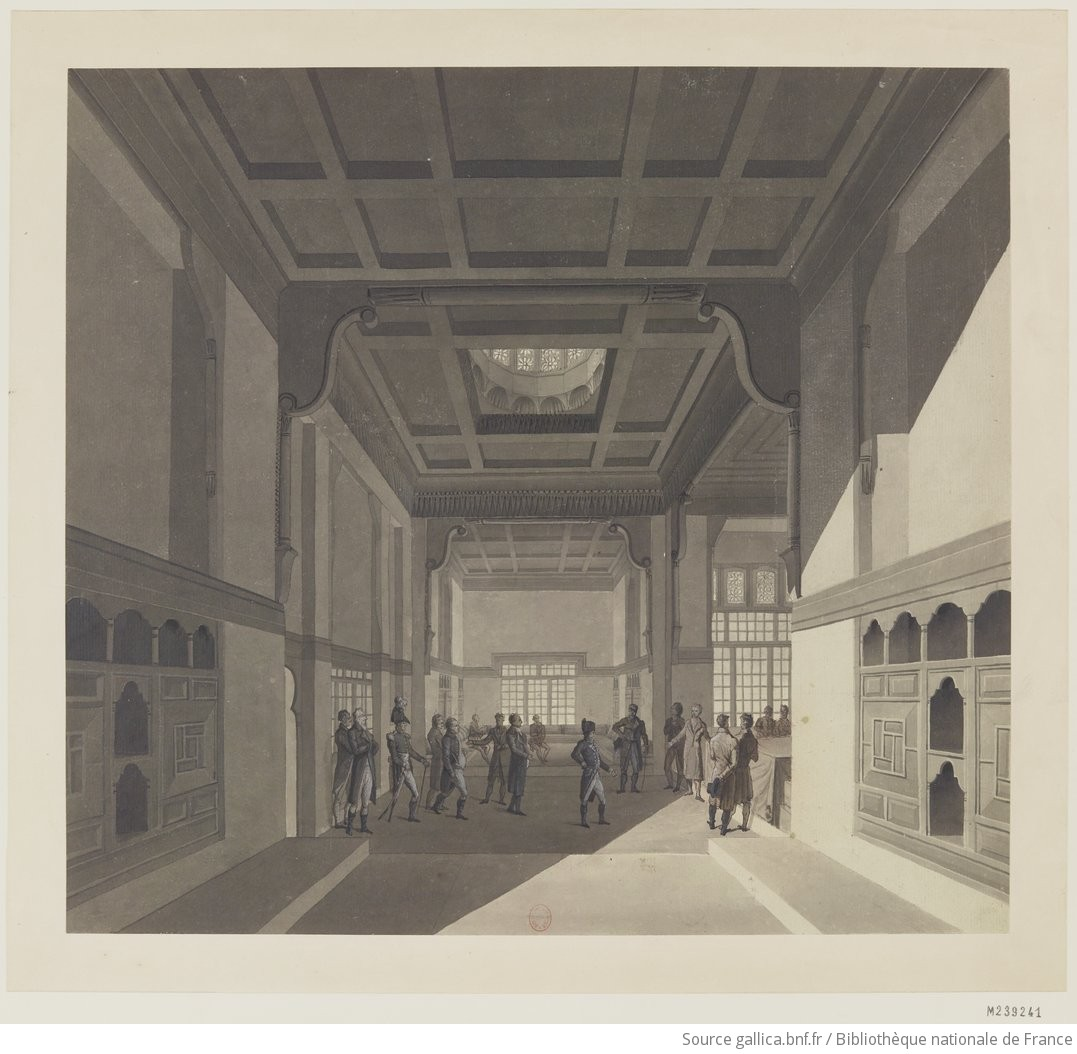
First meeting of the Institut d'Égypte in Cairo

The French expedition to Egypt in 1798 marked a turning point in Egypt’s modern intellectual history. Napoleon Bonaparte founded the Institut d'Égypte in Cairo on 22 August 1798, organizing it into four sections: mathematics, natural sciences, political economy, and literature and arts. The institute included elite scientists, engineers, and artists tasked with studying Egypt’s natural resources, antiquities, and society, while also contributing to immediate tactical needs such as weapon production, water purification, and public health. They published their findings in periodicals such as La Décade Égyptienne and Courrier d’Égypte. Their collective work culminated in the monumental 25-volume Description de l’Égypte, compiled and published in France between 1809 and 1828.

=== Muhammad Ali's reforms ===
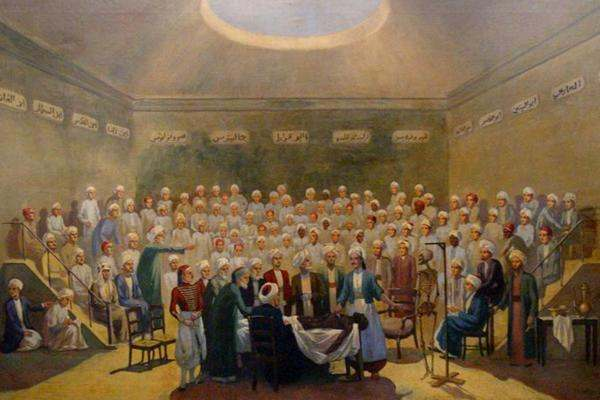
Early 19th-century illustration of an anatomy lesson in Egypt.

After the French withdrawal, Egypt entered a phase of decline until Muhammad Ali's reign (1805–1848), which revived learning through educational reform and cultural investment. The original Institut d’Égypte was reconstituted in 1836 (some sources say 1840) as The Egyptian Society, with a focus on antiquities and book collection. A new branch of the institute opened in Alexandria in 1859 under the same name, supported by Egyptian and European scholars. In 1880, the headquarters moved back to Cairo. By this time, the institute’s mission included studies in medicine, agriculture, Egyptology, and the sciences.

Modern education in Egypt was formally introduced under Muhammad Ali, who sought to modernize the country’s educational system based on the French model. His efforts created a dual system: traditional religious schools (mansouri) and modern secular institutions known as madrasas. The mansouri system focused on memorization and recitation of the Qur'an, with minimal emphasis on critical thinking or scientific inquiry. In contrast, the madrasas followed a structured pedagogical approach inspired by European models.

To further educational reform, Muhammad Ali dispatched two organized student missions to France, aiming to develop local expertise. The first mission was privately initiated to sustain the intellectual spirit of the 1798 Napoleonic expedition, while the second, in 1844, was supported by the French government as part of its broader colonial ambitions in North Africa.

Scientific and intellectual life diversified under Khedive Ismail and his successors. The Geographic Society was founded in 1875 with a mission to carry out geographic research, especially in Africa. In 1882, the first Arabic Language Institute was established, later reconstituted in 1932 under state patronage to modernize Arabic. The Agricultural Society was founded in 1898 to improve cultivation and combat pests. Other notable bodies include the Egyptian Society for Political Economy, Statistics and Legislature (1909), the Fine Art Lovers Society (1923), and several scientific and cultural associations in fields such as medicine, entomology, law, archaeology, and the arts.

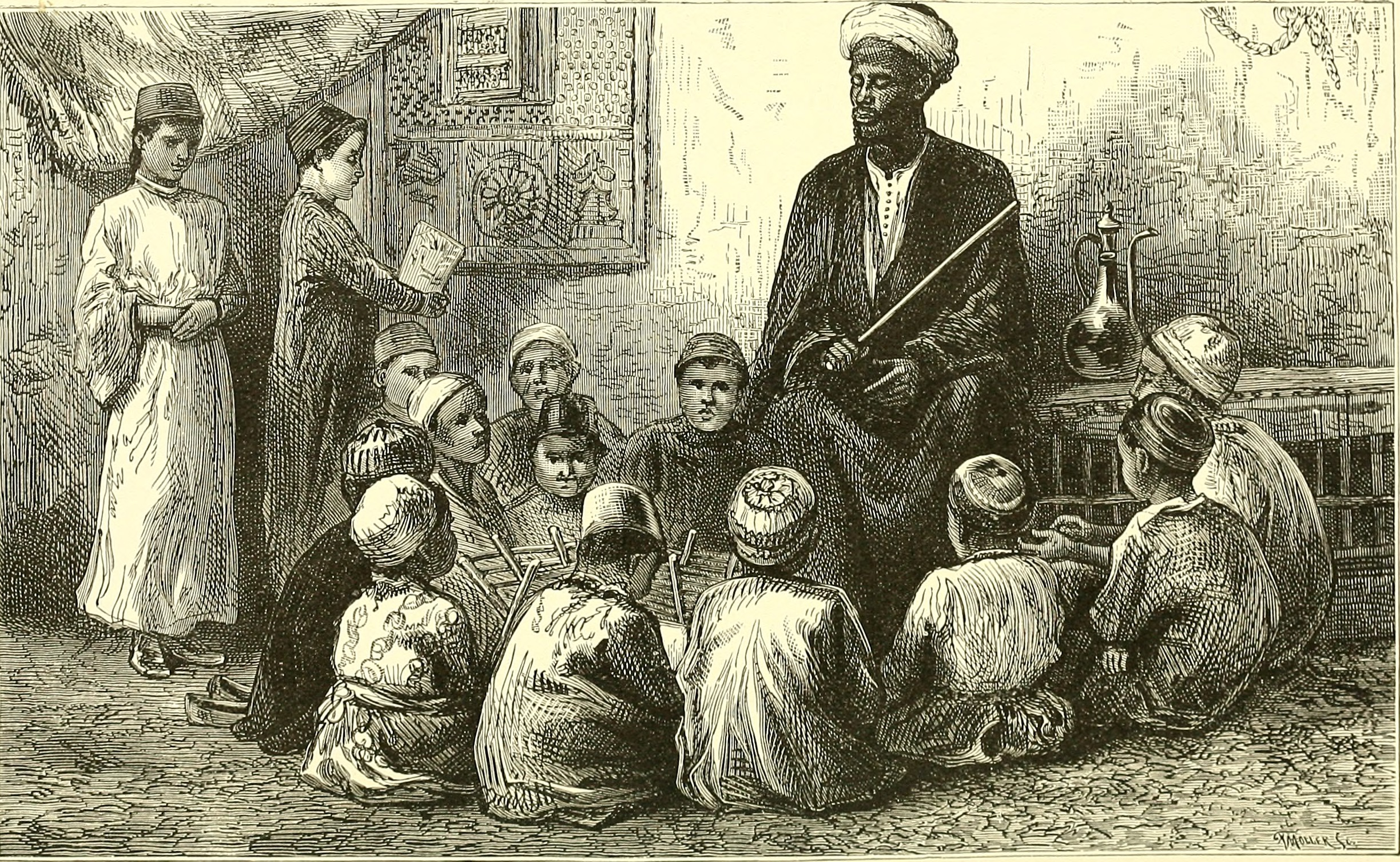
Late 19th-century illustration of an Egyptian school, where students sit on the floor reciting lessons aloud in unison.

Khedive Ismail, expanded educational institutions, widening the gap between different schooling systems. By this period, three distinct types of schools coexisted: elite Western-style schools for foreigners and upper-class Egyptians, modern schools in urban centers, and the kuttab, traditional Islamic schools offering basic education primarily for lower-class children. Under Khedive Abbas I, Ali Mubarak, the director of the government education system, attempted to extend education into rural areas, though disparities persisted. Schools in major cities provided modern curricula and foreign languages, while rural institutions remained limited to basic literacy and arithmetic.

=== Neglect under British occupation ===
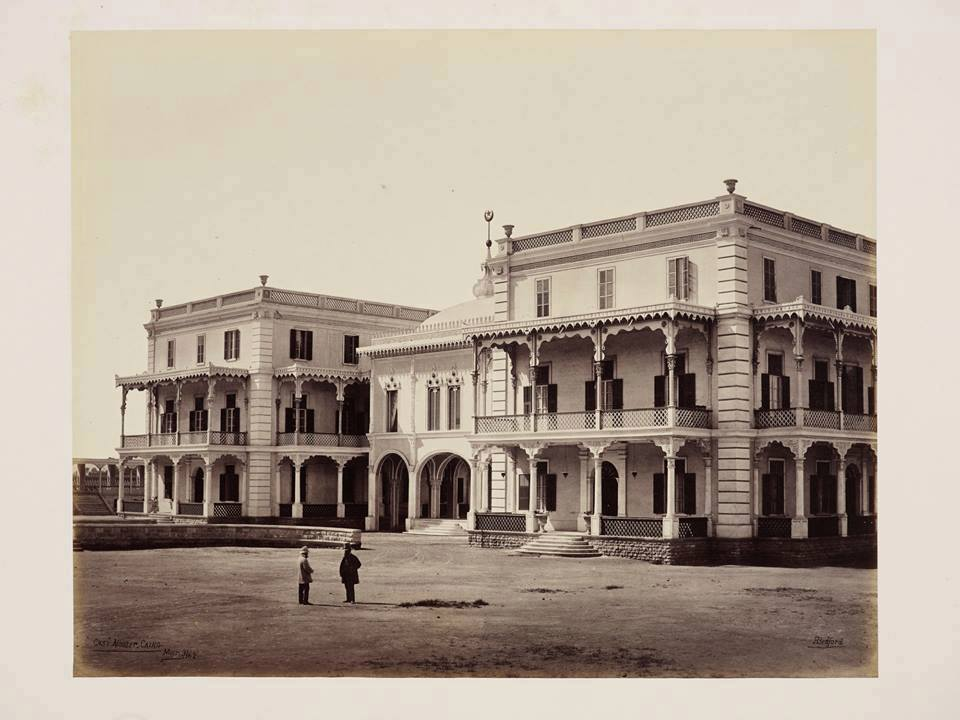
Tawfiqiya School in Shubra, 1950

With the British occupation of Egypt in 1882, education suffered from systematic neglect. British authorities prioritized countering French influence and suppressing Egyptian nationalist movements advocating educational reform. Consequently, efforts to expand access to education were dismantled, restricting modern schooling to the elite and foreigners. Lord Cromer, the longest-serving British resident in Egypt, viewed education with suspicion, fearing it would incite political unrest. He implemented budget cuts, closed specialized postsecondary institutions, and shifted the focus of curricula toward vocational training. Tuition fees were also introduced, significantly limiting access to education for most Egyptians. These restrictions were gradually lifted following Cromer’s retirement in 1907.

In the first half of the 20th century, Egypt had a wide network of scientific and intellectual institutions that supported research, publication, and education. Institutions like the Institut d’Égypte attracted global and Egyptian scholars, including Gaston Maspero, Ahmed Kamal Pasha, and Ali Moustafa Mosharafa. The institute resumed publishing and hosting lectures, opening its library and events to the public. Parallel societies contributed to cultural and scientific development until well into the post-independence era.

=== Post-independence ===
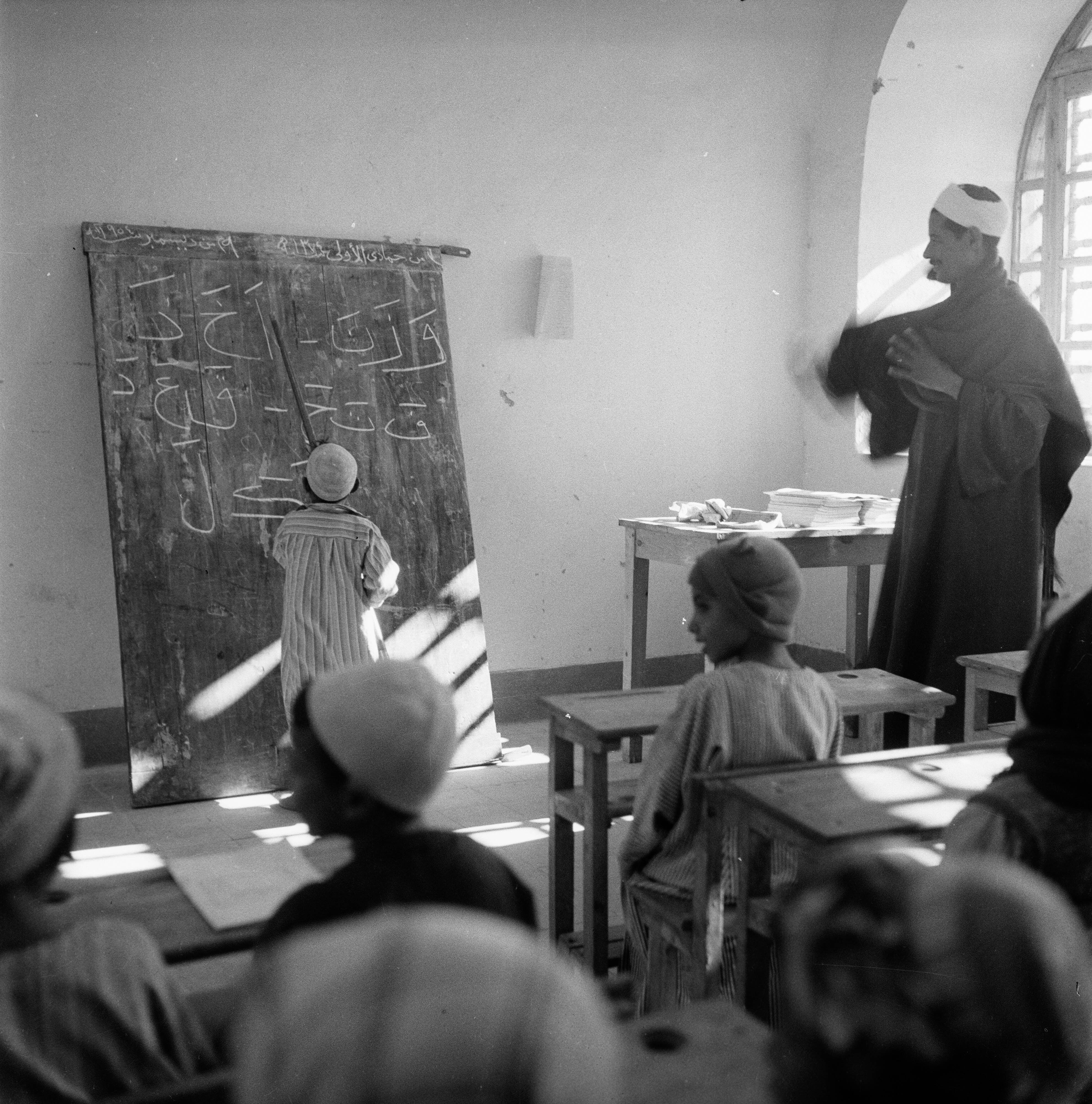
A classroom in the village of New Gourna, 1954

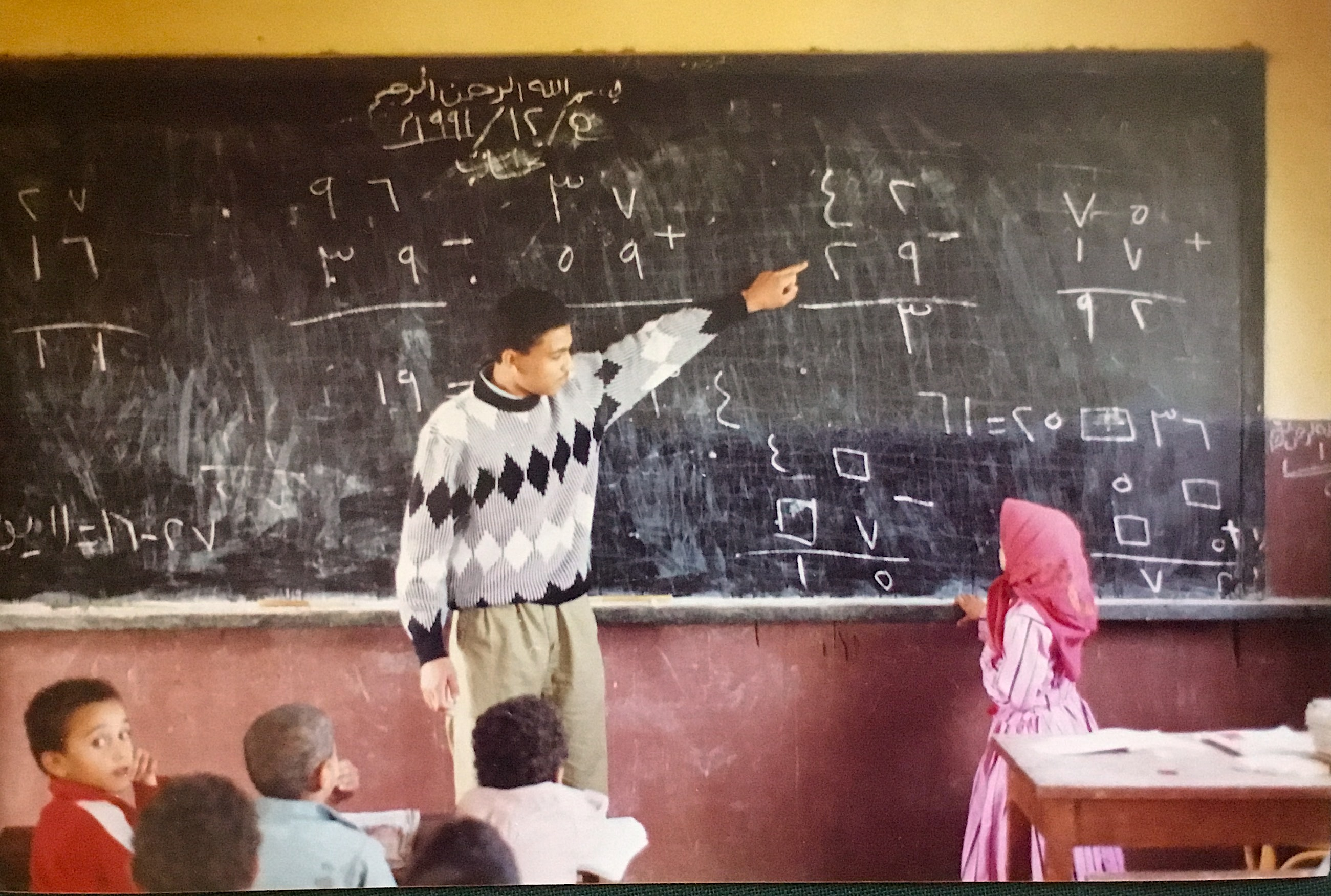
A primary school math class in rural Egypt, 1991

Following the Egyptian Revolution of 1952, Gamal Abdel Nasser introduced sweeping reforms, including free public education for all Egyptian children. While this right had been enshrined in the Egyptian Constitution of 1923, it was not fully implemented until Nasser’s socialist policies took effect.

Since the 1990s, Egypt has adhered to international conventions and implemented education reforms aimed at improving outcomes through the adoption of "best practices" and "knowledge-sharing" models. While significant progress has been made in expanding access to education, challenges persist in enhancing quality. Quantitative achievements include increased net enrollment rates for primary education, reaching 96.9%, a reduction in primary school dropout rates to 0.4% between 2016/2017 and 2017/2018, and a transition rate from primary to preparatory education of 99% between 2017/2018 and 2018/2019.

However, measuring education quality through standardized assessments such as Trends in International Mathematics and Science Study (TIMSS) has revealed substantial shortcomings. In 2015, Egypt ranked 49th out of 50 countries in reading for fourth-grade students, 34th out of 39 in mathematics for eighth-grade students, and 38th out of 39 in science for eighth-grade students. Reforms introducing active-learning pedagogies, decentralization, and technology integration have yielded limited success, largely due to structural challenges within the education system. Traditional teaching methodologies, high student-to-teacher ratios, inadequate infrastructure, low teacher status, and a reliance on rote memorization in examinations have hindered progress.

The COVID-19 pandemic has had a strong influence on the Egyptian educational system and the rise of distance education. The results of a study on a sample of 147 students showed that students appreciated comfort in the home environment, saving time and effort, and having better access to learning resource.

== Education system ==
Structure of Education in Egypt
Basic Education
Arabic: التعليم الأساسى (al-Taʿlīm al-Asāsī)

Includes:
• Primary school (ages 6–11)
• Preparatory school (ages 12–14)

Secondary Education
Arabic: التعليم الثانوى (al-Taʿlīm al-Thānawī)
Higher Education
Arabic: التعليم الجامعى (al-Taʿlīm al-Gāmiʿī)

The Egyptian educational system is highly centralized, and it is divided into three main levels, with the first one being compulsory for all children.

Since the extension of the free compulsory education law in 1981 to include the preparatory stage, the primary and preparatory phases (ages 6 through 14) have been collectively categorized under the term basic education. Advancement beyond this stage depends on individual student performance. In addition, many private schools offer alternative educational programs that complement the national curriculum, including the American High School Diploma, the British IGCSE system, the French baccalauréat, the German Abitur, and the International Baccalaureate.

=== Basic education ===
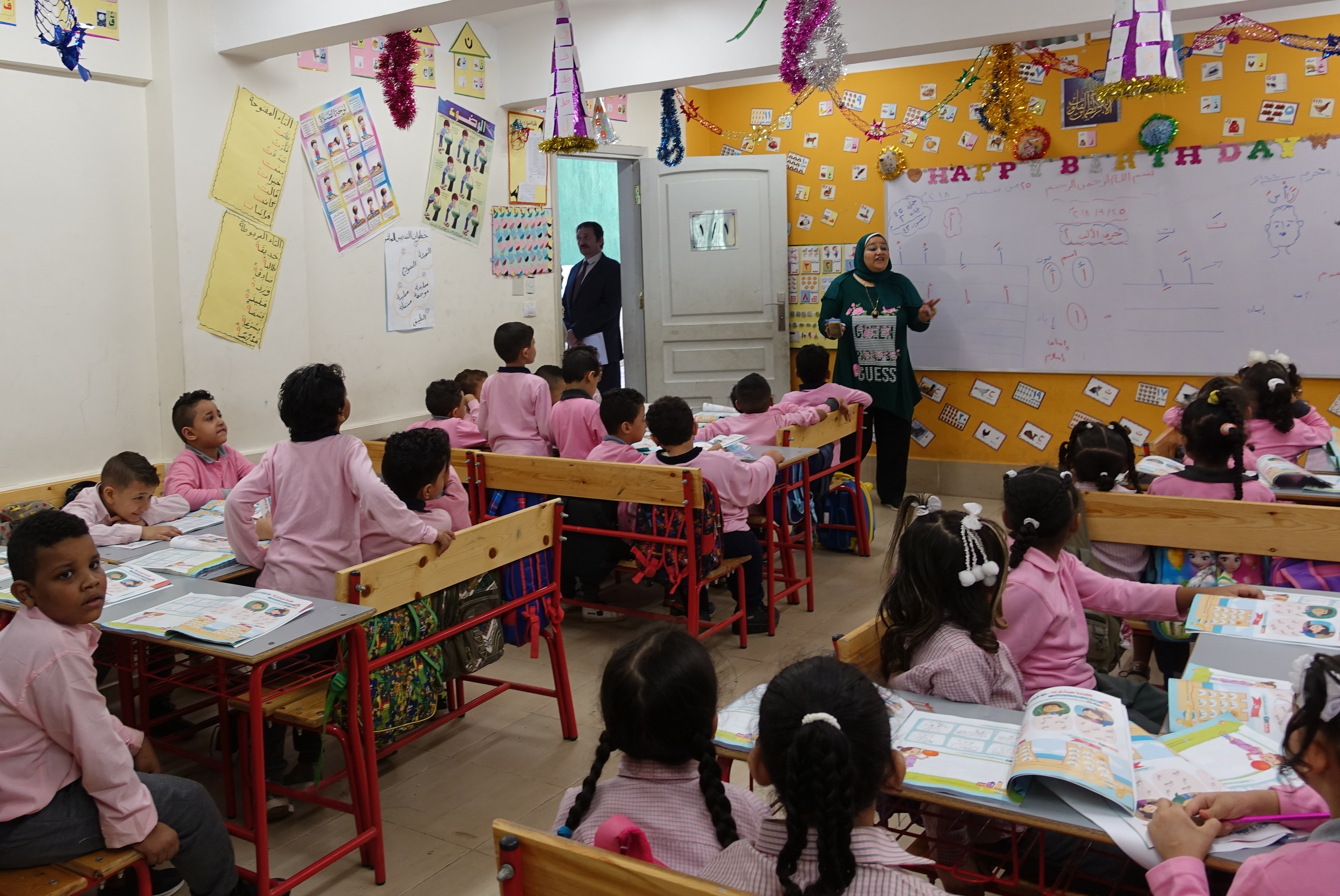
A first grade classroom

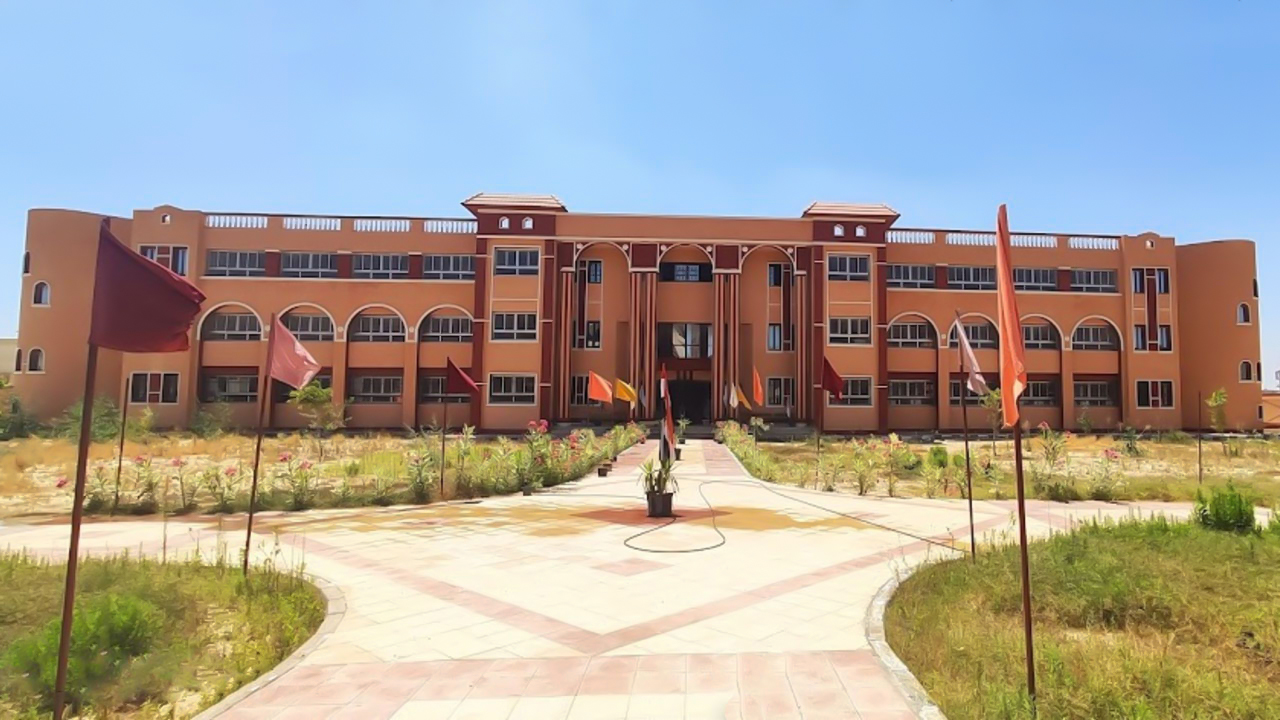
A school in the Alexandria Governorate

At the basic level, children aged 4 to 14 receive education beginning with two years of kindergarten, followed by six years of primary school and three years in preparatory school (classified as ISCED Level 2). This phase is succeeded by a three-year secondary school stage (classified as ISCED Level 3) for students aged 15 to 17, after which tertiary education commences. Compulsory education covers nine academic years between the ages of 4 and 14, and all levels are provided free of charge in government-run institutions. According to the World Bank, disparities exist in the educational attainment of affluent and impoverished students, a phenomenon referred to as the "wealth gap". Although the median years of schooling differ by only one or two years between these groups, the wealth gap may extend to nine or ten years in certain contexts, whereas in Egypt it was approximately three years in the mid-1990s.

Egypt initiated its National Strategic Plan for Pre-University Education Reform (2007/08, 2011/12). With the subtitle “Towards an educational paradigm shift”, Its key components include access and participation, teacher development, pedagogy, curriculum design and learning assessment, the production and distribution of textbooks and learning materials, management and governance, and an overall quality improvement strategy.

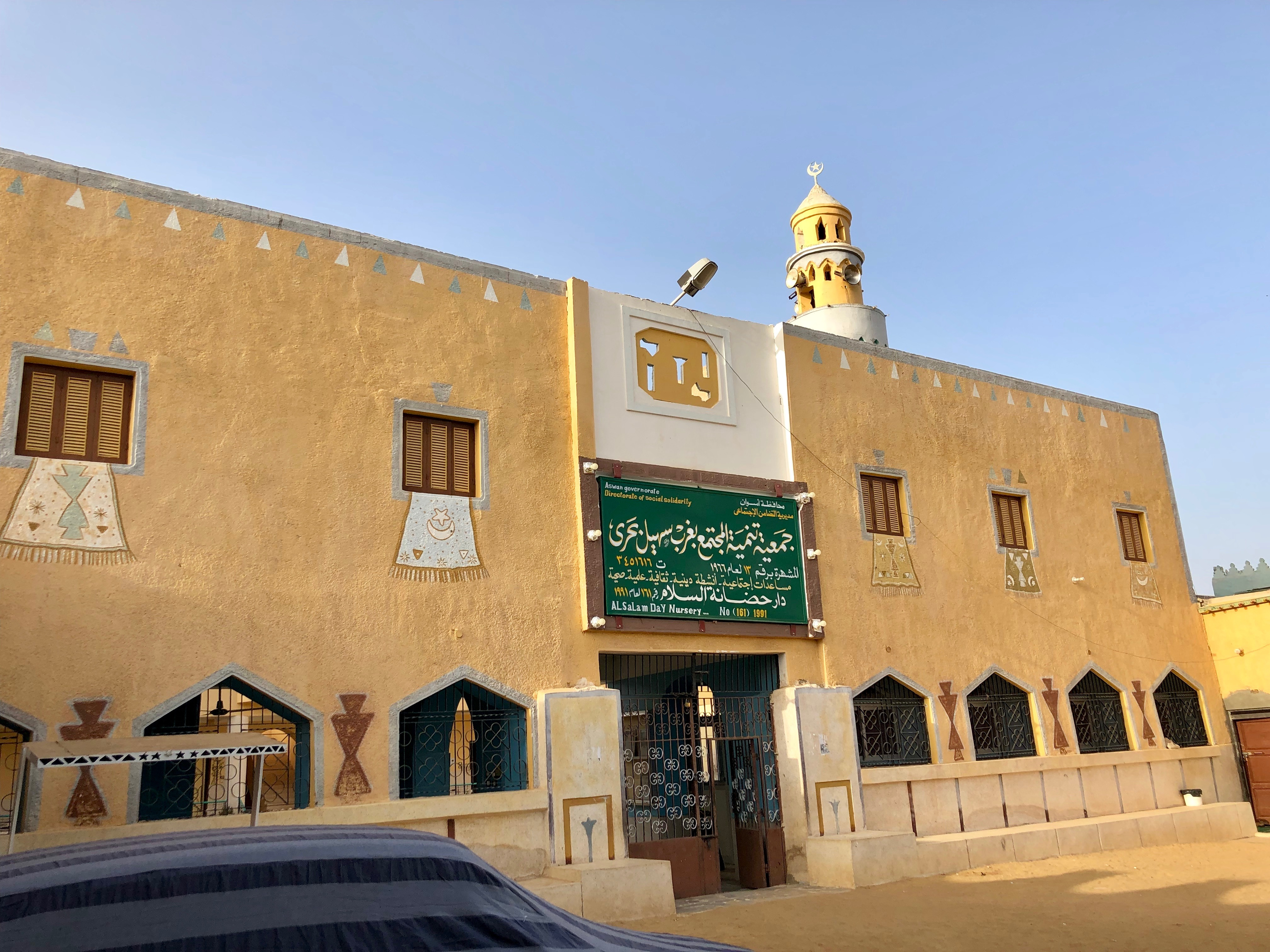
A village school in the Aswan Governorate

Examinations for promotion are held at all levels, except in grade 6 and grade 9 at the basic education level, and in grade 12 at the secondary stage, where standardized regional or national exams are administered. The Ministry of Education is responsible for policy decisions in the education sector, supported by three specialized centers: the National Center of Curriculum Development, the National Center for Education Research, and the National Center for Examinations and Educational Evaluation. Each center focuses on distinct aspects of education policy in collaboration with various state-level committees.

In addition, a formal teacher qualification track is in place for both basic and secondary education. Prospective teachers are required to complete four years of pre-service courses at a university before entering the profession. Specific programs offered by the Professional Academy for Teachers aim to enhance teaching standards in mathematics, science, and technology, while local educators are also afforded opportunities to participate in international professional training programs.

=== Secondary education ===
Following the successful completion of basic education and its corresponding national examination, students progress to secondary education, which is divided into two distinct tracks, general and technical. The general track lasts three years, while technical programs extend between three and five years, covering disciplines such as industrial, agricultural, and commercial studies. Some technical institutions also operate a dual education system.

More recently, the government has introduced Applied Technology Schools to further enhance technical and vocational education and training (TVET). In 2006, the Industrial Training Council (ITC) was established by ministerial decree to coordinate all TVET-related initiatives, projects, and policies. The ITC's efforts are aligned with the "Technical Education Strategy" (2011/2012, 2016/2017), which was developed in response to the 2007 Enterprise Surveys that identified insufficient labor skills as a significant constraint for 31 percent of firms operating in Egypt.

=== Higher education ===
Cairo University

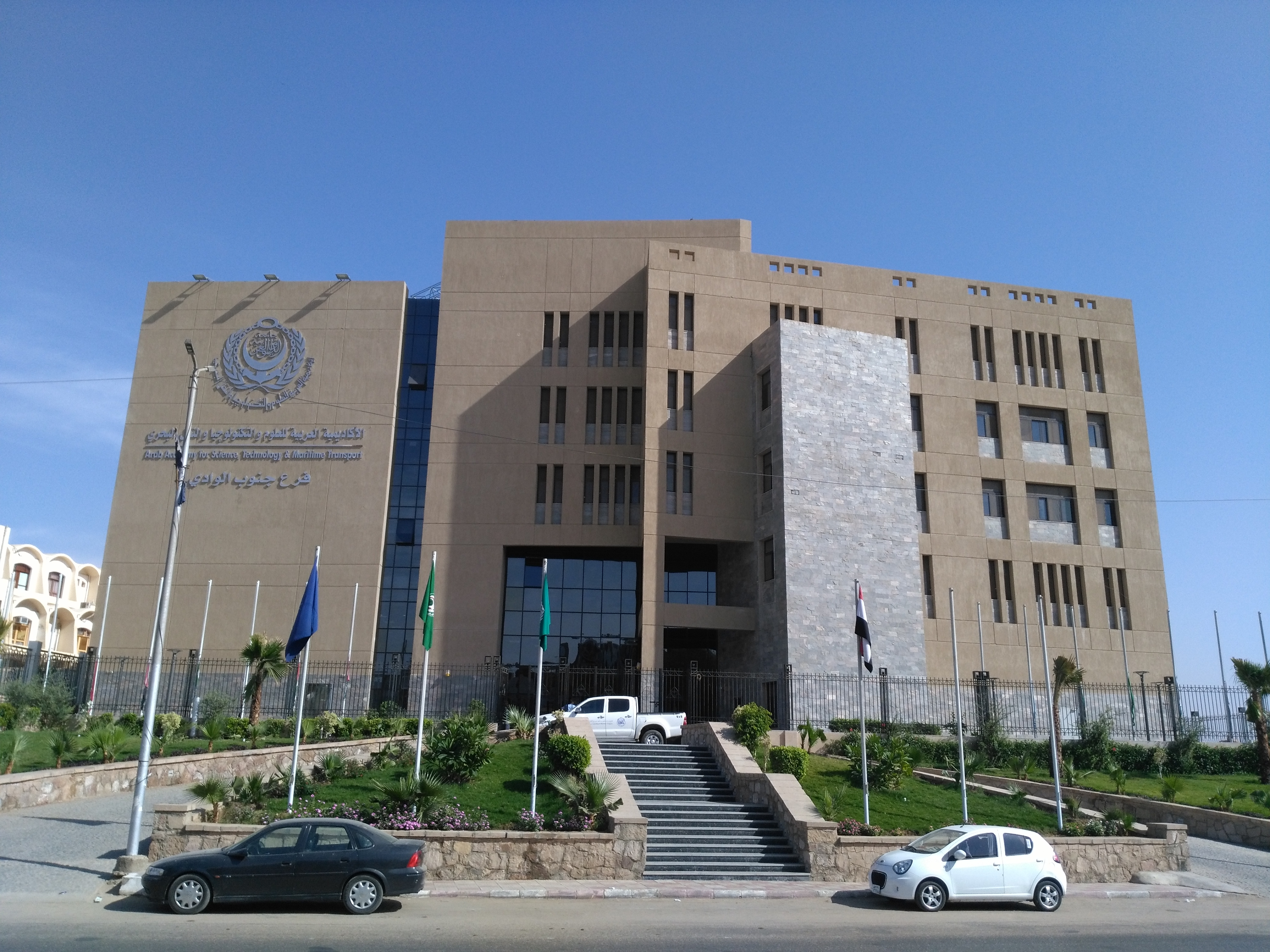
Arab Academy for Science and Technology in Aswan

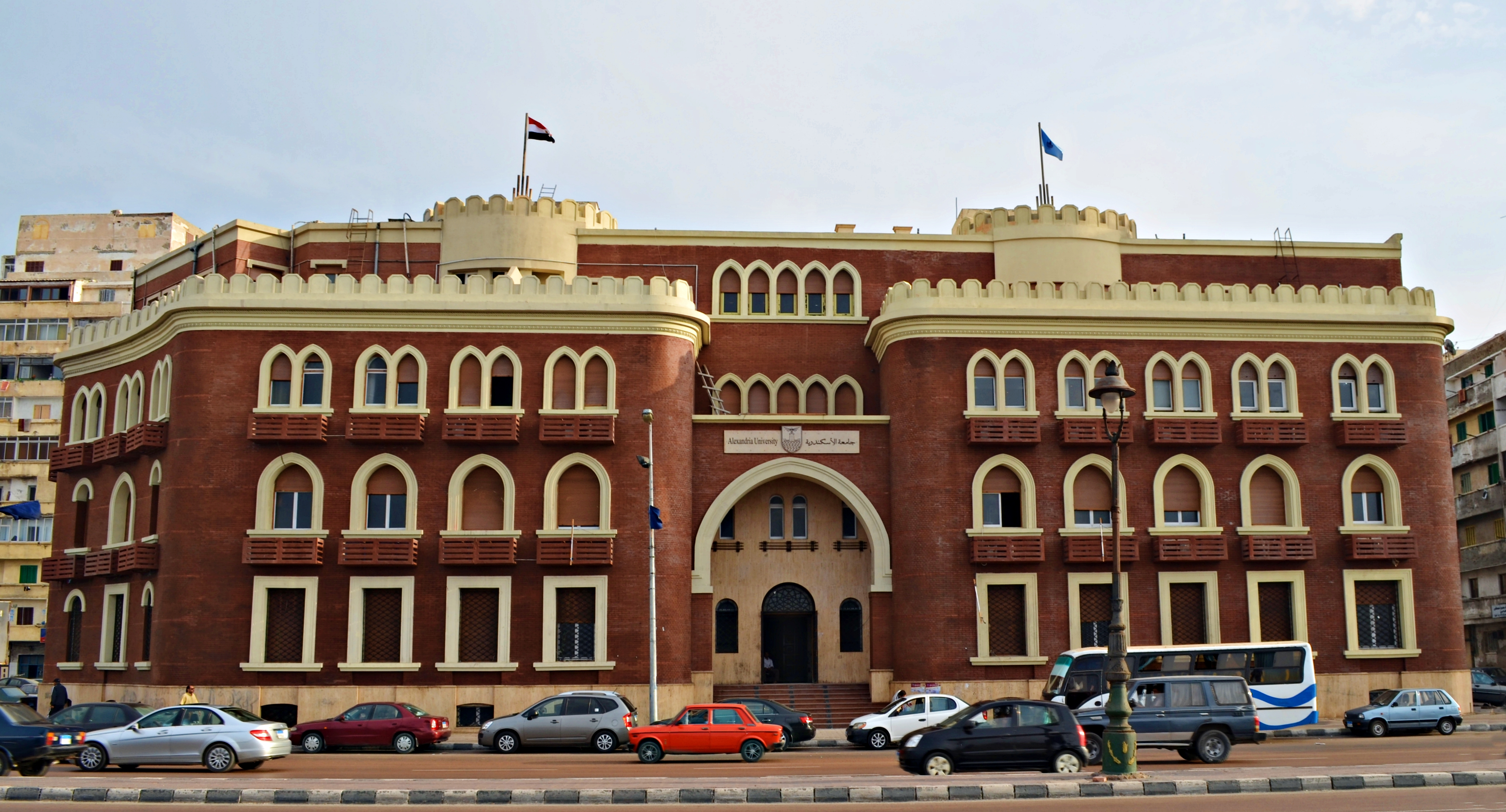
Alexandria University

Egypt has a very extensive higher education system and it comprises both public and private institutions. Public higher education is available for fees ranging from 0 to 5000 EGP (about US$0–100) per year, while private institutions typically charge significantly higher tuition fees.

Approximately 30% of Egyptians in the relevant age group attend university; however, only about half of these students ultimately graduate.

The Ministry of Higher Education supervises the tertiary level of education. The current system comprises a diverse range of institutions, including 27 public universities, 51 public non-university institutions, 27 private universities, and 89 private higher institutions. Among the 51 public non-university institutions, 47 are two-year middle technical institutes (MTIs) and four are four- to five-year higher technical institutes. The higher education cohort was projected to increase by nearly 6 percent (approximately 60,000 students) per annum through 2009.

Egypt’s tertiary education is characterized by a highly centralized governance structure, whereby institutions have limited control over curriculum design, program development, and faculty appointments. In 1990, legislation was enacted to grant greater autonomy to universities, yet the necessary infrastructure, equipment, and human resources remain insufficient to support the increasing number of higher education students. Gross enrollment in tertiary education rose from 27 percent in 2003 to 31 percent in 2005, while spending on new programs and technologies has not kept pace.

Between 1992/93 and 1997/98, the number of students entering higher education grew by approximately 17–18 percent per year, resulting in a roughly 40 percent decline in per-student spending in real terms during that period. With the higher education cohort projected to increase by nearly 6 percent (60,000 students) per annum through 2009, significant efficiency improvements will be required merely to sustain current quality levels.

The Egyptian government acknowledges the challenges confronting the higher education sector. Key issues include the need to improve governance and efficiency, increase institutional autonomy, enhance the quality and relevance of academic programs, and maintain current levels of access. In response, the Ministry of Higher Education has taken a leading role in reform initiatives. In 1997, the minister at the time promptly established the Higher Education Enhancement Project (HEEP) Committee, which convened a wide range of stakeholders, including industrialists and parliamentarians. A National Conference on Higher Education Reform was convened in February 2000, culminating in a declaration for action endorsed by both the president and the prime Minister. This declaration, which identified 25 specific reform initiatives, has garnered support from multilateral and bilateral agencies, including the World Bank.

In August 2004, HEEP strategic priorities were adjusted to address quality and accreditation concerns and to align with the government's emphasis on scientific research. This adjustment incorporated two additional dimensions: the development of postgraduate studies and scientific research, and the enhancement of students’ extracurricular activities alongside the continued implementation of the six originally prioritized programs. To support these dynamic reform strategies, a Strategic Planning Unit (SPU) was established within the MOHE to ensure the sustainability of planning and project monitoring across successive reform phases, and a Students’ Activity Project (SAP) was initiated to further bolster program accreditation alongside scientific research and postgraduate studies.

In July 2025, Egypt announced a Japan-inspired engineering diploma. The diploma will begin teaching in September 2025.

The QS World University Rankings 2025 includes 15 Egyptian universities, with Cairo University ranked 350th among them. The American University in Cairo follows, improving its position to 410th place. Several Egyptian universities have advanced in rankings compared to the previous year, reflecting ongoing improvements in higher education.

Egypt remains the largest contributor to higher education capacity in North Africa as of QS World University Rankings: Arab Region 2026, with a long-established public university system complemented by private institutions, like The American University in Cairo (AUC), Cairo University, Ain Shams University, Alexandria University, and also Future University in Egypt (FUE).

== International schools ==
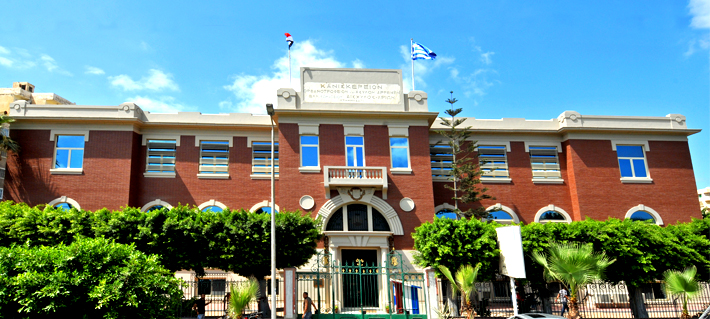
The Lycée Français d'Alexandrie of Alexandria in 2013

As of January 2015, the International Schools Consultancy (ISC) reported that Egypt was home to 184 international schools.

International schools in Egypt are privately operated institutions that deliver curricula from foreign countries. Instruction is primarily conducted in English or in the language of the school’s country of origin, with some schools offering bilingual programs.

A majority of these schools follow either the British curriculum, the American system, or the International Baccalaureate (IB) framework, although several institutions also adhere to French or German educational models.

== Al-Azhar system ==
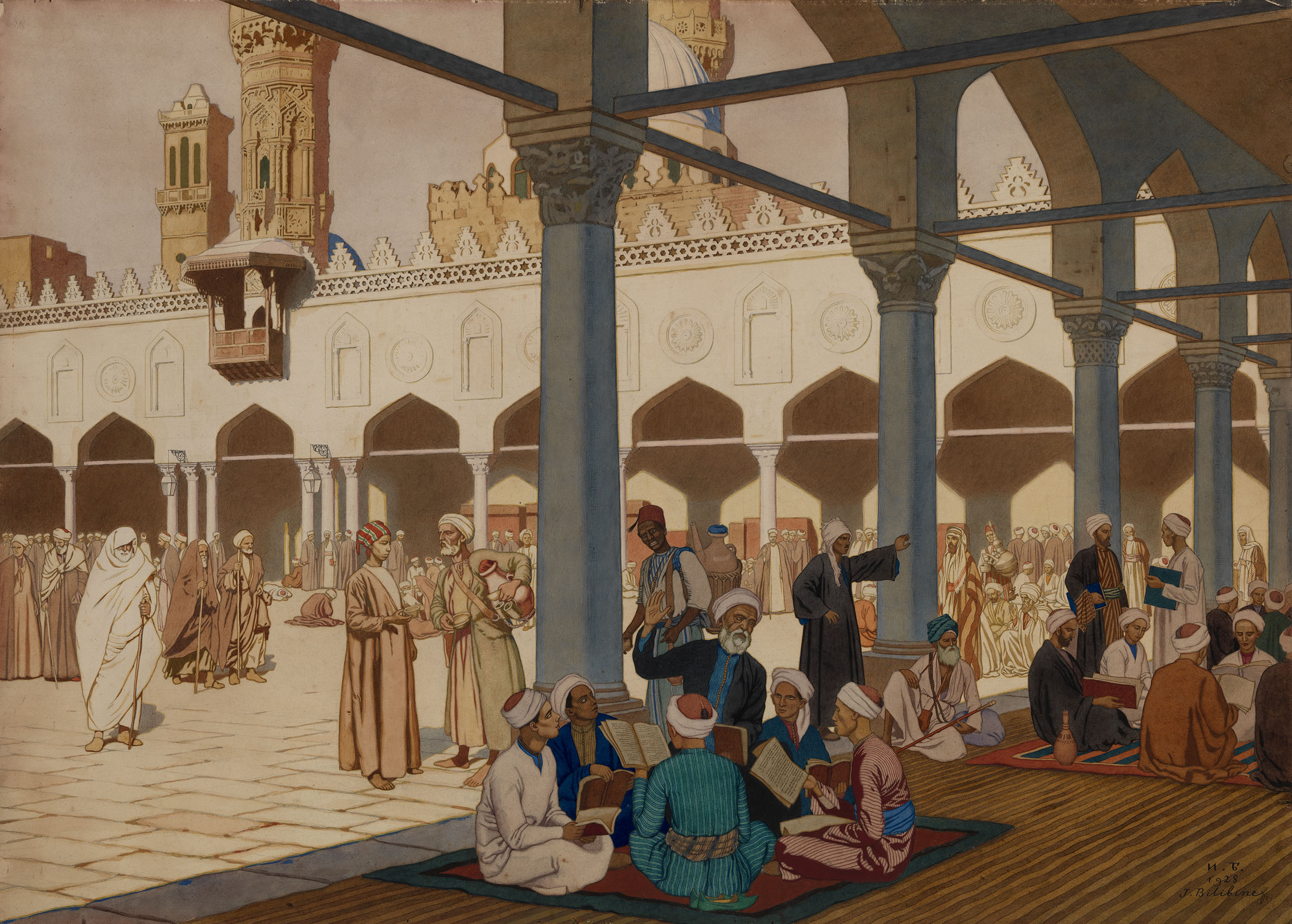
Study circles at Al-Azhar Mosque

Another system operating concurrently with the public educational system is the Al-Azhar system. This system comprises a six-year primary stage, a three-year preparatory stage, and a three-year secondary stage. In 1998, the Ministry of Education reduced the number of secondary school years from four to three in order to align the Al-Azhar system with the general secondary education system. In this framework, separate schools are maintained for girls and boys.

The Al-Azhar educational system is supervised by the Supreme Council of the Al-Azhar Institution. Although the Azhar Institution is nominally independent of the Ministry of Education, it ultimately falls under the supervision of the Egyptian Prime Minister. Al-Azhar schools, designated as "Institutes," encompass primary, preparatory, and secondary phases. All stages include instruction in both religious and non-religious subjects; however, the curriculum predominantly emphasizes religious studies, and enrollment is limited to Muslim students.

Al-Azhar schools are distributed across the country, with a notable presence in rural areas. Graduates from Al-Azhar secondary schools are eligible to continue their studies at Al-Azhar University. As of 2007 and 2008, there were 8,272 Al-Azhar schools in Egypt. In the early 2000s, these schools accounted for less than 4% of total enrollment. Furthermore, graduates from the Al-Azhar system are automatically admitted to Al-Azhar University, and in 2007, pre-university enrollment in Al-Azhar institutes was approximately 1,906,290 students.

== Agricultural education ==
The Egyptian Ministry of Education, with the objective of enhancing agricultural knowledge and skills among young people, established 133 secondary agricultural schools across various cities and districts by the 2010/2011 academic year. These institutions offer two distinct pathways in agricultural education, comprising a three-year system and a five-year system. Both pathways deliver a combination of theoretical instruction, provided in classroom settings, and practical training through laboratories, workshops, and on-site farm experiences.

Furthermore, these schools collaborate closely with the Ministry of Agriculture to facilitate training opportunities for their teaching staff at agricultural research centres, focusing on technical farming issues. Additionally, farming plots are allocated to the schools, thereby providing practical training environments and creating job opportunities for graduates at institutions affiliated with the Ministry of Agriculture.

== Challenges ==
Although considerable progress has been made in expanding the country’s human capital through reforms in the education system, the overall quality of educational experience remains low and unevenly distributed. The inadequacies in basic and secondary public education have contributed to the rapid expansion of a parallel market for private tutoring, which has evolved from a supplementary measure into a near-compulsory practice. According to the Egypt Human Development Report (2005), 58 percent of surveyed families reported that their children receive private tutoring. Data from CAPMAS (2004) indicated that households allocate, on average, approximately 61 percent of their total educational expenditure to private tutoring. Furthermore, households in the richest income quintile spend over seven times more on private tutoring than those in the poorest quintile.

Among the prevailing challenges are the inadequacies of public education and the growing reliance on private instruction. As of 2005, between 61 and 70 percent of Egyptian students were enrolled in private tuition. Additional systemic issues include the embezzlement of public education funds, and widespread occurrences of examination leakage.

Egyptian education faces a fundamental challenge stemming from the quality of teaching staff employed in public schools. An ethnography conducted by Sarah Hartmann in 2008 found that many individuals enter the teaching profession in Egypt due to a lack of alternative employment opportunities, and because the profession aligns with societal expectations of women’s roles as mothers. The low remuneration offered by the public education system tends to attract individuals with limited qualifications. A 1989 study examining the bureaucracy of the Egyptian Ministry of Education reported that the average annual salary for teachers was approximately $360. A subsequent study in 2011 indicated only a modest increase, with the average annual salary rising to $460, less than half of Egypt’s average per-capita income.

The generally low qualification levels among teachers also reflect a lack of foundational training in child psychology, impeding their ability to interact effectively with students. Corporal punishment remains a prevalent disciplinary method in Egyptian schools, though it has received limited academic scrutiny. A notable incident in 2011 brought national attention to the issue, when a kindergarten teacher was recorded repeatedly striking students with a stick.

A study conducted by UNESCO on educational equity in the world's sixteen most populous countries positioned Egypt in the mid-range with regard to the equity of primary and secondary school enrollments across its governorates. However, when wealth is factored into educational attainment, the findings are less favorable. Enrollment rates at both the primary and secondary levels are markedly higher in more affluent regions. This disparity underscores the need for increased efforts to address the wealth-related gap in educational access.

A study conducted by the World Economic Forum in 2013 ranked Egypt as the lowest globally in terms of the quality of primary education. Overall, Egypt was placed 118th, the lowest position among all countries in the Middle East.

According to Human Rights Watch, the Egyptian government has failed to fully guarantee free primary and secondary education. Public schools charge annual fees ranging from 210 to 520 Egyptian pounds (approximately US$5–10), which are waived only for some low-income students. Despite these official fees, families bear further costs due to the poor quality of public education, often resorting to private tutoring. As of 2019, even before recent inflation, households with school-aged children were spending an average of 10.4% of their income on school-related expenses.

Youth unemployment is also very high, primarily due to lack of access to necessary training under TVET programs. In 2019, the unemployment rate among university graduates in Egypt reached 36.1%, with male graduates experiencing a rate of 25.1% and female graduates a rate of 53.2%.

== See also ==
- List of Egyptian universities
- Academic Freedom in the Middle East
- Ali Pasha Mubarak
- Isma‘il al-Qabbani
