= Crown Letters and Punctuation and Their Placements =

Educational document

Crown Letters and Punctuation and Their Placements (Arabic: حروف التاج وعلامات الترقيم ومواضع استعمالها) is a manifesto published by the Egyptian Ministry of Education and written by Abd Al-Qādir ‘Ašūr in 1932. It was released after the creation of the Crown script to be a manual of sorts.

== History ==
In 1932, the Egyptian Ministry of Education, on the order of then-King Fuad I, issued a decree for the introduction of capital letters for the Arabic script along with the standardization of punctuation for the Arabic language, largely following earlier proposals by Ahmad Zaki Pasha modelled on French punctuation. Punctuation was included because, previously, there were no set rules for Arabic writing. The Egyptian Ministry of Education released an explanatory manifesto titled Crown Letters and Punctuation Marks and Their Positions of Use, written by Abd Al-Qādir ‘Ašūr and published by Al-Misaḥa Printing House. It was very likely the first book ever written in Crown script. Its proposed capital letters were short-lived, though the use of the punctuation marks continued.

== Content ==
The manifesto stated that:

1. Capital letters (Note: As shown in supplement one.) are to be called 'Crown letters' (حروف التاج, ḥurūf al-tāj); taking into account the form in which these letters are enthroned and because they were developed under the will of the Crown.
2. Punctuation marks are to be used. (Note: As shown in supplement two.)
3. Crown letters are to be used. (Note: As shown in supplements three and four.)
4. The Ministry of Education may use all the wherewithal necessary to popularize the use of the Crown letters and punctuation marks and all that is required by the implementation of that from integrating them into curricula to the promulgation of their benefits to the crowds to the facilitation of their use in the press.

== Crown script ==
The Crown script (خط التاج, khaṭṭ al-tāj) is a modern Arabic script designed by Egyptian calligrapher Mohammad Mahfouz in 1931. King Fuad I, on the advice of the British Orientalist Denison Ross, had new 'Crown letters' designed for use at the beginning of a new sentence, similarly to English capital letters. Crown letters differed from small letters in that they possessed a loop—or an upside-down لا—on top of them; letters that may connect to the next letter also connect to that loop, whereas letters that do not connect to the next letter also don't connect to that loop.

More accurately, however, the Crown script isn't really a script of its own; it's more of an addition to existing scripts. The Ministry of Education's manifesto specified that Crown letters may be used with Naskh and Ruqʿah scripts.

== See also ==
- Arabic punctuation
- Arabic calligraphy § Scripts
- Academy of the Arabic Language in Cairo
