= Reda Hegazy =

Egyptian politician

- رِضا حجازي
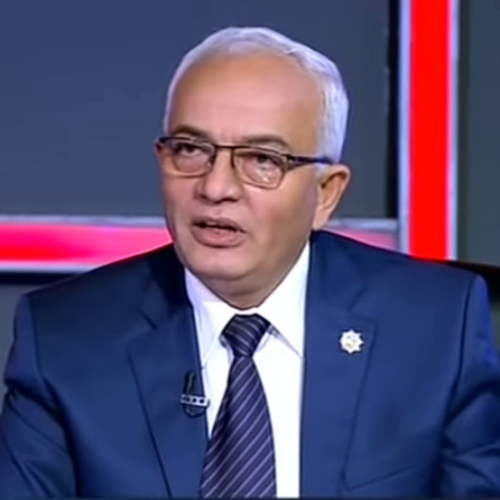

Minister of Education and Technical Education
- In office 13 August 2022 – 2 July 2024
- President: Abdel Fattah el-Sisi
- Prime Minister: Mostafa Madbouly
- Preceded by: Tarek Shawki

Personal details
- Born: Reda el Sayed Mahmoud Hegazy; 4 December 1959 (age 66) Egypt
- Education: Mansoura University

Reda Hegazy (Arabic: رِضا حجازي; born 4 December 1959) was the Egyptian Minister of Education and Technical Education in the cabinet headed by Mostafa Madbouly in succession of Tarek Shawki.

Before appointing, Hegazy had long held the position of deputy minister of education at the Ministry of Education.

In September 2023, Hegazy as Minister of Education announced plans for schools to Ban female students from wearing niqab.
