= Ali Pasha Mubarak =

Egyptian education reformer in 19th century

- علي باشا مبارك
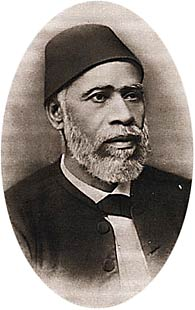
- Born: 1823 or 1824; Brembel Al Gadidah, Dakahlia Governorate, Egypt Eyalet
- Died: 14 November 1893 (Aged 69 or 70); Cairo, Khedivate of Egypt
- Known for: Reforming Egyptian Education in the 19th Century

Ali Pasha Mubarak (Arabic: على مبارك; born 1823 or 1824; died 14 November 1893) was an Egyptian public works and education minister during the second half of the nineteenth century. He is often considered one of the most influential and talented of Egypt's 19th century reformers. Ali Mubarak is known for his contribution in the reconstruction of Cairo's landscape and for founding Egypt's modern educational system.

His most famous work is titled al-Khitat al-Tawfiqiyya al-Jadida (Arabic: الخطط التوفيقية الجديدة; Tawfiq's New Plans, referring to Egypt's ruler at the time), which provides a detailed, street-by-street description of Egypt's major cities and villages.

He also contributed to the start of the Egyptian National Library and Archives around 1870 which is one of the largest and oldest government libraries.

== Early life ==
Ali Mubarak was born in Brembel Al Gadidah village in the Dakahlia Governorate in 1823. Ali Mubarak did not come from a wealthy family, however, he was a part of the Mashayikh family that was known to produce the local Qadi, Imam, and Khatib. The situation of his family would indicate that Ali Mubarak would pursue a career as a religious figure for his rural community. During his youth, Ali Mubarak studied at many different schools and worked for different government clerics. He attended a government prep school before being admitted to the Cairo School of Engineering. During his studies in Cairo he was the top student and as a result was chosen to be a member of a student mission sent by Muhammad Ali to France in 1844. He studied in Paris for two years and directly after that in Metz at the school of application of artillery and engineering (French: École d'application de l'artillerie et du génie). He returned to his homeland in 1849 and was given an instructors position in the artillery school. After this in 1850, he became the first native Egyptian Muslim to be appointed the director of the entire system of government schools. This marked the beginning of his "rich career of public service that spanned nearly four decades and included appointments as head of the ministries of education, public works, and railways."

=== Early Education and Apprenticeships ===
After studying under the instruction of his father during his early childhood, Ali Mubarak spent two years studying with a Faqih. This schooling experience stayed with him for most of his life. In his later years, Ali Mubarak wrote about his fear of beatings by his teacher. He never attended school without a small gift that he could give to his teacher to avoid beatings. After two years of instruction under the Faqih, Ali Mubarak refused to return to the school because he did not wish to become a Faqih. He left the school in the hopes of working under the local Katibs.

Ali Mubarak had two apprenticeships under two different Khatibs. Both apprenticeships ended poorly. He quit his first apprenticeship because he was maltreated and he was dismissed from the second apprenticeship because he spoke out against his master's reception of gifts. He then returned home to study under his father for a year before he began a third apprenticeship under a local government clerk. After working under the clerk for three months, Ali Mubarak still had not received his promised salary. After taking his owed salary from funds collected by the local official, Ali Mubarak was imprisoned for theft.

During his imprisonment, a prison guard caught Ali writing. The guard was so impressed with Ali's amazing handwriting that he offered him a job and eventually set him free. It was during this short imprisonment where Ali Mubarak first voiced his dissatisfaction with the lack of Egyptians in the Egyptian government. Egypt was still very much a part of the Ottoman Empire at this point in time. Although Egypt was a fairly autonomous region under Muhammad Ali, the majority of officials in the Egyptian government continued to be Ottoman Turks until the mid-1800s. Ali Mubarak was determined to change the system and then aspired to attend a new modern school in Cairo where students were taught Turkish, arithmetic, and writing.

In 1836, Ali Mubarak finally achieved his goal and enrolled in the Qasr al-Ayni School where he dreamed about the fine dress of the students and the schools fine academic reputation. He soon realized, however, that the school did not measure up to the standards he had set for it. Ali Mubarak believed the school to be poorly organized with insufficient accommodations for the student body. After attending Qasr al-Ayni for a year, Ali Mubarak and his school mates were moved to Abu Zabal while their former school was transformed into a medical school. At the new school, Ali Mubarak was able to focus more of his attention on his studies as opposed to the military drills taught at Qasr al-Ayni. Ali Mubarak was still not pleased with the teaching style. He was very critical of the school's emphasis on memorization of material.

=== French Education ===
In 1844 Ali Mubarak was chosen to accompany the royal princes as they polished their education in France. Ali Mubarak spent two years studying in Paris, then two years studying at the military academy in Metz, and then spent a year studying with the French Army. Ali Mubarak was summoned back to Egypt in 1848 and was awarded the military title of Pasha because of his education with the French military. He was asked to teach at the Tura Artillery School.

== Government Work ==
Ali Mubarak is highly regarded because he was one of the first native born, Arabic-speaking, Muslim Egyptians to hold a prestigious government position. Mubarak's career with the Egyptian government began upon his return to Egypt in 1849. The formation of the Egyptian bureaucracy in the 1800s was largely a result of the work of Muhammad Ali. Under his reign, he established many new government departments, a centralized system of government employed by civil servants. Muhammad Ali of Egypt established six departments as part of the executive branch during his rule; Department of Marine, Department of War, Department of Finance, Department of Industry, Department of Education, and Department of Foreign Affairs. After his death in 1849, four new departments were created: the Department of Interior, Department of Public Works, Department of Justice, and Department of Agriculture.

In his government career, Ali Mubarak served as the minister heading the Egyptian government school system, the Egyptian railroads, and design and implementation of ambitious urban construction programs in Cairo, and the design and establishment of major irrigation projects.

=== Department of Education ===
When Ali Mubarak returned to Egypt from his schooling in France in 1849, he was given the task to reorganize the public school system under Khedive Abbas I.

Ali Mubarak was awarded the position of director of the government education system. He remained in that position for four years and was responsible for introducing many education reforms. Under Abbas, Ali Mubarak and his two friends and colleagues, Hammad Abd al-Ati and Ali Ibrahim were assigned to assess the competence of the engineers in the Irrigation Department and the teachers in the government schools because Abbas believed them to be unqualified to hold such positions. After their review of the teachers and engineers, Abbas commissioned the three men to create an economic plan for the government education system. Ali Mubarak formulated a budget for the Department of Education that significantly cut spending. His proposal was approved in 1850 by Abbas and he was promoted to the position of colonel.

In addition to improving efficiency in the Egyptian education system, Ali Mubarak wanted to create an environment where students were inspired to be a part of the Egyptian nation and to encourage students to pursue education in modern technology. He used his past experience as a student to identify situations that needed to be addressed. One of Ali Mubarak's major projects was increasing the availability of textbooks to Egyptian students. He helped establish a movable type printing press and started a campaign to translate European textbooks into Arabic and print and distribute the textbooks to Egyptian students. Ali Mubarak also set out to improve the welfare of students by improving their food, clothing, and instruction environment. In his opinion, teachers should have a fatherly role in the eyes of their students in order for education to be the most effective.

When Ismail ascended to rule Egypt in 1863, Ali Mubarak was one of the first men called to help reorganize the government systems. Ali Mubarak worked for a period of time supervising the construction of building, bridges, and dams before returning to the Department of Education. Under Ismail, the government passed the “Organic Law” for Egyptian education which led Egypt down the road of nationalizing the education system. As a result of this law, enrolment in modern Egyptian schools increased from 1,399 to 4,445 students between 1867 and 1878.

With a supportive executive branch of government, Ali Mubarak was able to enact a number of education reforms. One of his successful projects was the development of schools for students and military officers to learn European theories and histories of warfare. The new Egyptian school system was an influential system for teaching students new ideas about modernization.

=== Department of Public Works ===
Ali Mubarak's emphasis on modernizing Egypt went beyond education. During the late 1800s, Ali Mubarak played a major role in creating the outlines for the modern city layout of Cairo. The city of Cairo underwent a major modernization process during the 1800s. In 1847, Egypt was still considered to be a member of the Ottoman Empire. Even though Egypt was fairly autonomous, the elite Turkish minority, ruled the region. By the end of the nineteenth century Egypt was still considered to be a part of the Ottoman Empire, however, it was more directly ruled and influenced by the British. Egypt's relationship with Europe, (mostly Britain and France), was a catalyst for modernization. The Exposition Universelle in Paris in 1867 was a major influence on the development of the city of Cairo. The Paris Exposition Universelle laid the foundation for the idea of what constituted a modern city. Ismail was greatly affected by the Exposition. Shortly after he arrived back in Egypt, Ismail gave Ali Mubarak the head position in the Ministry of Public Works. As head of the ministry, Ali Mubarak was responsible for modernizing Cairo in a European style.

Mubarak and his team quickly worked together to create a blueprint for modern Cairo. They quickly identified what they believed to be the main hindrance of the city of Cairo, traffic. The use of carriages was quickly expanding in Cairo and the streets were not wide enough to accommodate so many carriages traveling in opposite directions. Mubarak and his team estimated that there were over nine hundred carriages in Cairo in 1875 and more than eighteen hundred transport cars clogging the streets of the city. In order to address the increasing traffic in the city, Mubarak planned to widen roads in Cairo by demolishing buildings on the sides of the roads. In one case, about four hundred large houses, three hundred small homes, as well as shops and mosques were demolished to make room for a two-kilometer highway. Inspired by the streets of Europe, the highway was finished with sidewalks, gaslights, and shrubbery.

By the year 1900, Cairo had undergone a vast modernization project, however, some areas of the city were untouched by the modernization attempts. Cairo became divided into an old and a new city. The modern region of the city lay to the west and north and was radically different socially and economically from the old city. While many of the elites in Egypt desired to create a European image of their country, Europeans desired to see the exotic when they traveled through Egypt.

Although Ali Mubarak spent a lot of his time working with the Ministry of Public Works, he continued to work with the Ministry of Education. Outside of his work with the Egyptian government, Ali Mubarak also found time to write extensively on military engineering, educational theory, as well as writing an encyclopedia called, al-Khitat al-Tawfiqiyah.

== Writings ==
Ali Mubarak is considered by many to be “Pioneer among Egyptian historians” because of his influential writing. He cited new scientific research and draws upon European research in his work which is completely written in Arabic. Ali Mubarak is perhaps most well known for his completion of the twenty volume “Al-Khitat al-Tawfiqiyah.” In al khitat, Ali Mubarak gives a historical and topographical description of Cairo. He gives a very detailed description of the locations of the buildings and streets of Cairo. However, in addition to classifying and ordering the locations of Cairo, Ali Mubarak also provides a commentary on institutions in Cairo.

In organizing al-Khitat, Ali Mubarak organized the history of Cairo into dynasties. He saw the development that Cairo experienced in the second half of the nineteenth century as positive progress while criticizing the state of the city when it was under Ottoman rule. In his opinion, the Ottomans did not take sufficient care of the city when they controlled most of the government. Streets, buildings, and squares were not adequately taken care of resulting in copious amounts of dust and odors overtaking many parts of the city. Mubarak believed this to be a health concern and emphasized the need for modern city throughout his writings.

=== Ali Mubarak's Interest in Ancient Egypt ===
During the late nineteenth century, Egypt experienced a reawakening of interest in the history of ancient Egypt. Egyptian intellectuals worked to integrate European sciences with the study of ancient Egyptian history. They hoped that by using science to explain ancient Egyptian civilization a sense of pride and positive understanding could be fostered amongst Egyptian for their unique history. The scholars also hoped to illustrate the progress that Egypt experienced over its long history.

Many Egyptians viewed the pharaohs and the physical remnants of their kingdoms as sacrilegious objects. Ali Mubarak encouraged seeking knowledge of Egypt's past. He believed that everyone should be knowledgeable about the history of his or her community. He believed that ignorance and indifference of the lives of a community's ancestors cannot foster positive growth for the future. It is only possible for a country to grow together by sharing and appreciating the past. As more intellectuals studied Egypt's ancient history and wrote and spoke about it, the past became a source for nationalistic sentiments. The work that Ali Mubarak and his colleagues undertook laid the foundations for territorially defined Egyptian nationalism in the twentieth century.

=== Al-Khitat ===
Ali Mubarak was a major contributor the process of creating sentiments of nationalism in Egypt through his active role in the public sphere and his many publications in Arabic. Ali Mubarak published work in a number of magazines, journals, and books and covered topics from science, education, justice, translations, and political commentaries. However, his most famous work is Al-Khitat al-tawfiqiyya al-jadida. Al-Khitat is a twenty-volume work that contains information on the geography, topography, and history of Egypt. It brought together information on literature, history and science in en encyclopedic format. Al-Khitat is considered to be Ali Mubarak's biggest achievement. Throughout the twenty volumes, Mubarak illustrates the interconnectedness of history and geography and uses the relationship between the two to create a national identity for Egypt.

In al-Khitat, Ali Mubarak emphasizes his belief that with knowledge comes technical progress and material affluence which in turn produced "self-respect, patriotic pride, and deference to authority." He believed that education was the key to advancing Egypt .

=== Ali Mubarak's Criticism of Al-Azhar ===
As the head of the Department of Education, Ali Mubarak wrote extensively on education in Egypt. He was an advocate for European styles of education with a focus on science and enlightenment philosophy and wrote many criticisms of education in Egypt. One of the oldest educational institutions in Egypt is al-Azhar, a center for learning about Islam.

Ali Mubarak viewed al-Azhar as a significant part of the Egyptian history and identity because of its prominent role in educating Egyptians for centuries. However, Ali Mubarak believed that the time had come for al-Azhar to modernize. With the reforms undertaken by the Egyptian government during the nineteenth century, Ali Mubarak thought that it was only to be expected that al-Azhar modernized as well. Ali Mubarak was very critical of the traditional education system that al-Azhar used. The old traditional system did not require students to take exams and did not have a formal system to determine who graduated from al-Azhar. Students who wished to become teachers at al-Azhar studied under a teacher until they were thought to be ready to begin teaching to a class. There was no method in place to monitor the academic progress of the students. Learning was entirely dependent on the motivation of the university students. Ali Mubarak highly regarded the spiritual lessons offered by al-Azhar but believed that the lack of structure in the university fostered undisciplined behavior, immorality, pride and pettiness and the structure needed to be reformed to recreate and mold the moral identity and personality of the modern state of Egypt.

Ali Mubarak's primary concern regarding al-Azhar was its lack of appearance of being a modern educational institution. He did not see al-Azhar as holding an important position in modern Egypt. In order for future generations of Egyptians to be successful, they needed to have the right education. Ali Mubarak encouraged institutions to teach information produced by Europe and give students the opportunity to become productive and important members of Egyptian society.
