= Ministry of Education (Egypt) =

Government ministry of Egypt

Coordinates: 30°2′11″N 31°14′11″E

Arab Republic of Egypt Ministry of Education
- وزارة التربية والتعليم
- Emblem of Egypt

Agency overview
- Formed: 28 August 1878
- Jurisdiction: Government of Egypt
- Headquarters: Cairo
- Agency executive: Mohamed Abdel Latif, Minister
- Website: moe.gov.eg/en/

The Ministry of Education is a ministry responsible for education in Egypt.

== Ministers ==
- Hilmi Murad 1968–1969
- Hussein Kamel Bahaeddin May 1991–13 July 2004
- El Helali el Sherbini from September 2015
- Tarek Shawki from February 2017 to August 2022
- Reda Hegazy From August 2022 to July 2024
- Mohamed Abdel Latif From July 2024

== See also ==
- Cabinet of Egypt
- Crown Letters and Punctuation and Their Placements (1932)
- List of ministers of education of Egypt
