= Tarek Shawki =

Egyptian politician (born 1957)

- طارق جلال شوقي
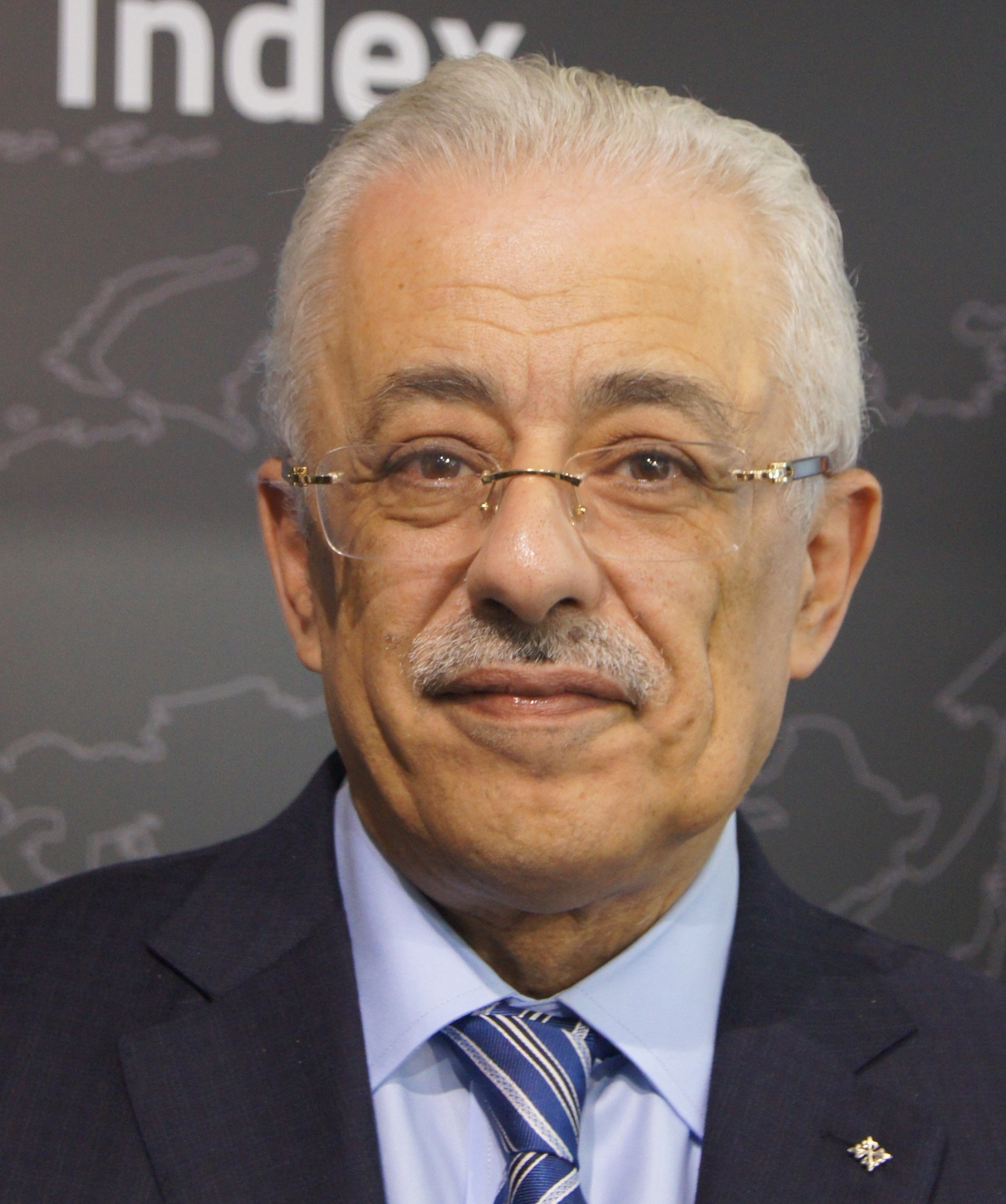
- Shawki in 2018
- Born: 12 June 1957 (age 69); Cairo, Egypt
- Education: Cairo University (B.A.); Brown University (M.Sc., M.Sc., Ph.D.)

Tarek Galal Shawki (Arabic: طارق جلال شوقى; born 12 June 1957) is the former minister of education in Egypt. He was the Dean of the School of Sciences and Engineering at the American University in Cairo (AUC). This academic assignment started on 1 September 2012 following a four-year tenure as the Director of the UNESCO Regional Bureau for Science in Arab States [2008-2012] located in Cairo, Egypt. Prior to his UNESCO Cairo Office appointment in June 2008, he was the Chief of the Section for "ICTs in Education, Science and Culture" within the "Information Society Division" in UNESCO headquarters (Paris, France). Shawki has served as the regional advisor for Communications and Information at the UNESCO Cairo Office (UCO) between January 1999 and November 2005. The UCO is a regional office for science, technology, and information for Arab states. Shawki has been a panelist on the National Science Foundation and the National Research Council. His leadership is considered paramount to the Arab region in modernizing university education in basic and engineering sciences, through the promotion of the Mathematica technology.

Shawki has pioneered the strategic public-private partnerships with the IT corporate within UNESCO which includes Microsoft, Intel, Cisco and Apple, Inc. He has been the key architect of the standard setting effort by UNESCO involving the "ICT Competency Framework for Teachers" ( ICT-CFT). Shawki has been developing major programs involving the effective use of ICTs in education, science and culture.

== Educational background ==
Educated at Cairo University in Egypt and Brown University in Rhode Island, U.S., Shawki spent 13 years as a researcher and professor of theoretical and applied mechanics at the University of Illinois at Urbana-Champaign, one of the top engineering schools in the world. Shawki has a Ph.D. and an M.Sc. in engineering, an M.Sc. in applied mathematics, and a B.Sc. in mechanical engineering.

== Quotes ==
- "The evident revolution in both communications and information technologies suggest a parallel revolution in the ways we pass knowledge to future generations. The children of today receive and process information in significantly different ways as opposed to their parents and grandparents. They are 'multi-dimensional/multi-processor' receivers of knowledge which renders current education models almost useless. We are envisioning a future in which the education world will be forced to engage into major re-structuring in order to meet the challenges of education delivery in the technology era."
