= Ahmed Gamal El-Din Moussa =

Egyptian professor

- أحمد جمال الدين موسى
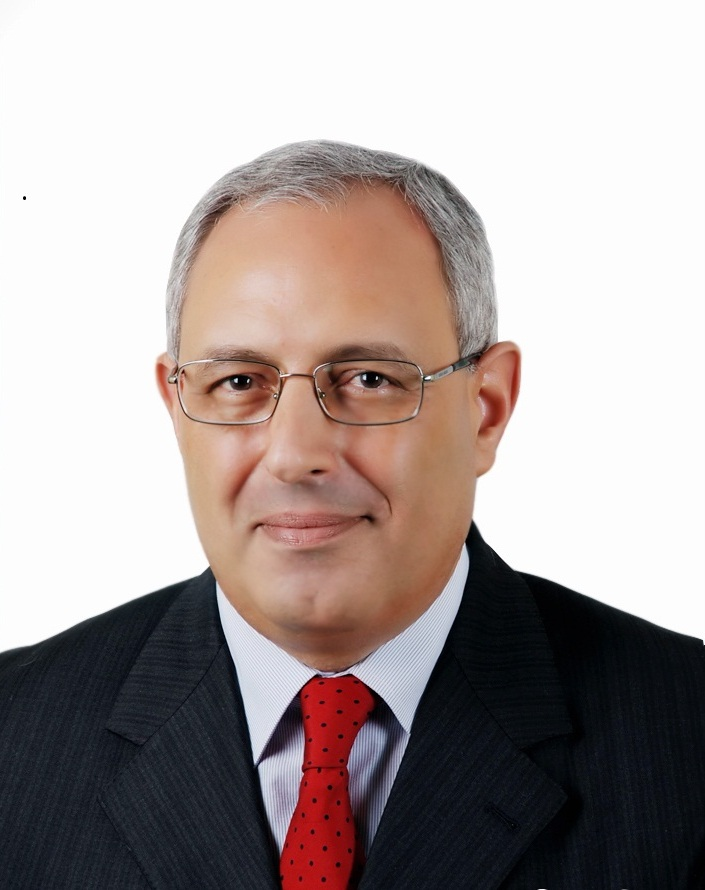
- Born: May 28, 1951 (age 75); Al-Mouqata, Sinbelawin, Dakahlia, Egypt
- Education: University of Cairo

Ahmed Gamal El-din Moussa (Arabic: أحمد جمال الدين موسى) (born 28 May 1951 in Al-Mouqata, Dakahlia, Egypt) was the Minister of Education and Higher Education in Egypt, during 2011. Prior to his appointment following a cabinet reshuffle led by PM Ahmed Shafik, he was the Minister of Education. Professor Moussa is the founder and Present Managing Partner of the Arab Law Firm, founded in 2007. Professor Moussa lectures in the faculty of law of Mansoura University.

== Career ==
Academic Qualifications

- I.E.M., Harvard University, U.S.A., 2003.
- Doctorat d'Etat in Law (public Finance), Université de Clermont Ferrand, France, 1984.
- Higher Studies Diploma in Administrative Sciences, Faculty of Law, Cairo University, 1976.
- Higher Studies Diploma in Public Law, Faculty of Law, Cairo University, 1975.
- Bachelor of Law, Faculty of Law, Cairo University, 1972.

Employment Record

- Professor of Economic and Public Finance, Faculty of Law, Mansourah University.
- President of Egyptian Legal Studies Sector Committee (Egyptian Subprime Council of Universities.
- Chairman of Professors Appointment Committee at the field of Economics and Public Finance.
- Minister of Education, Mars-December 2011.
- Minister of Education and Higher Education, February-Mars 2011
- Minister of Education, July 2004-December 2005
- President of Mansoura University, 2003-2004.
- Vice-President of Mansoura University for Education and Student Affairs, 2001-2003.
- Vice-Dean for Education and Student Affairs, Faculty of Law, Mansoura University, 1996-2001.
- Chair of Economic and Public Finance Dept., Faculty of Law, Mansoura University, 1995-1996.
- Professor of Economics and Public Finance, Faculty of Law, Mansoura University, since 1995.
- Associate Professor, Assistant Prof., Lecturer Assistant, Demonstrator, Faculty of Law, Mansoura University, 1977-1989.
- Member of Egyptian Conseil d'Etat, 1973:1977.

== Books ==
- "The King of the targeting", Novel, Cairo, General Egyptian Book Organization, 2019.
- "Meeting in the Oasis of Nostalgia", Novel, Cairo, Dar Nahdet Masr, August 2014.
- "Heidelberg American's Girl", Novel, Cairo, Dar Nahdet Masr, Jan. 2013.
- Institutional Reform, Egypt's Way for a Better Future, Cairo, Dar Nahdet Misr, 2010.
- Egyptian Income Taxation, Cairo, Dar El-Nahda El-Arabia, 2008
- Monetary and Banking Systems and Theories, Cairo, Dar El-Nahda El-Arabia 2008.
- Privatization, Cairo, Dar Nahdet Misr, 2007
- State Budget: Legal Framework and Economic Context, Cairo, Dar El-Nahda El-Arabia 2006.
- Economic, Political and Social Impacts of Privatization Program in Egypt, 2004.
- Principles of Political Economy, 2003.
- International Economic Relations and Theories of Development, 2001.
- Economy as a Social Science, 1998.
- Courses in Global Economy and the National Income, 1989.
- Studies in the International Economic Relations, 1989.
- The State and Social Justice in the Third world: Distribution and Redistribution of Income in Egypt:1952 - 1980, Thesis, Université de Clermont-Ferrand, France, 1984.

== Academic honors ==
- National Award for Social Studies, Egypt 2007.
- Excellence Medal from the President of the Republic in 1995.
- Winner of the National Prize for Environmental Studies, Egyptian Scientific Academy, 1992.
- Winner of the National encouragement Prize for Public Finance, Egypt, 1991.
- Winner of Mansoura University Prize for Social Sciences, 1988/1989.

== Scientific and professional membership ==
- Member of the Egyptian Bar, since 1997.
- Member of the Council for the Development of Social Science Research in Africa (CODESRIA), Dakar, Senegal, since 1992.
- Member of the Egyptian Society for Political Economy, Statistics and Legislation, since 1973.
