= 1926 Egyptian parliamentary election =

- 22 May 1926
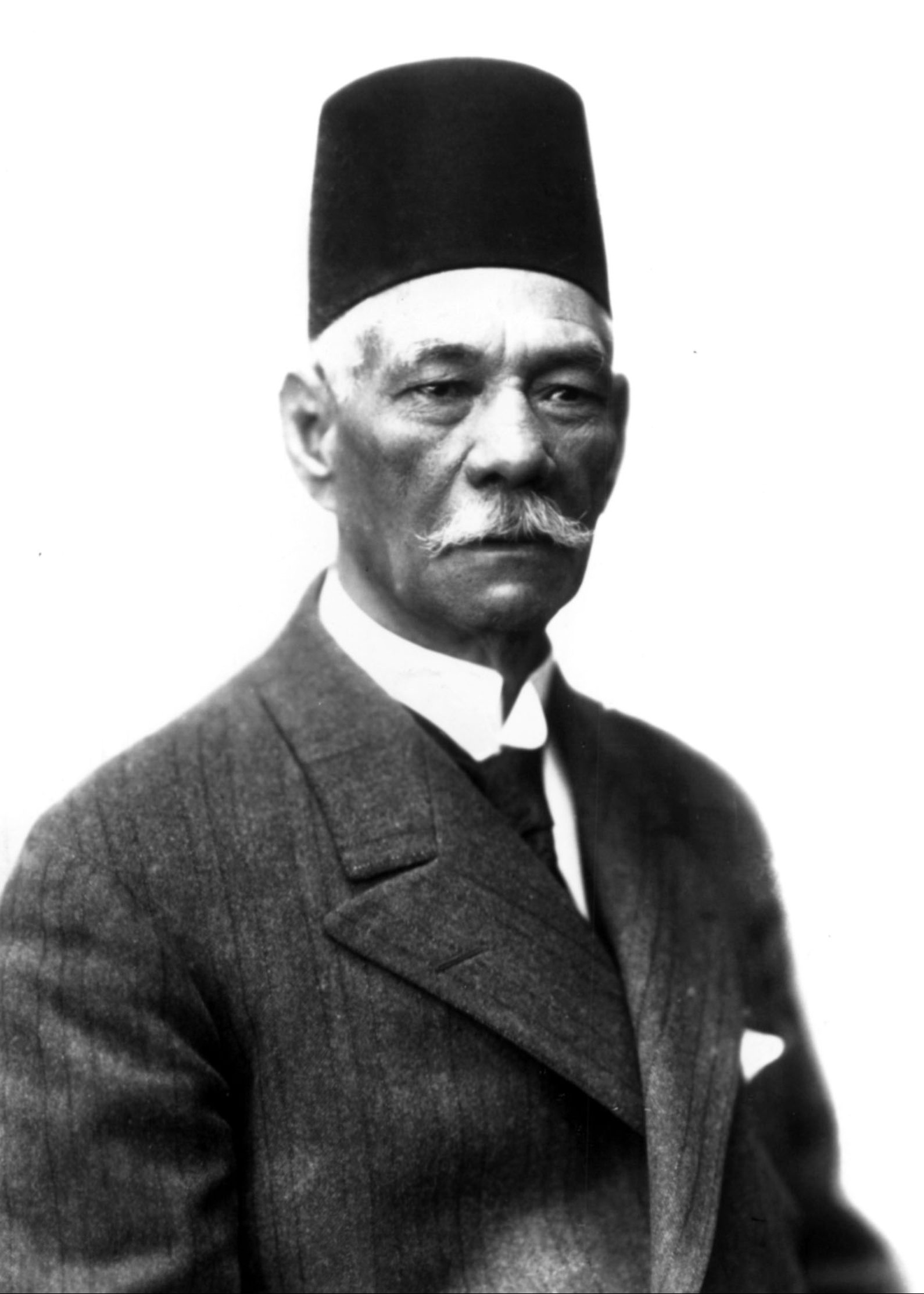

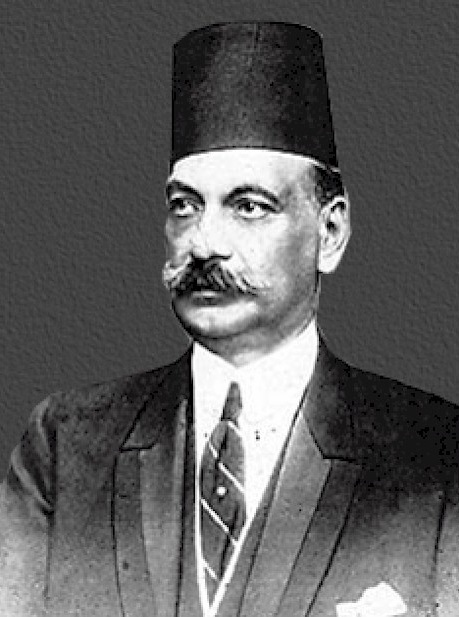

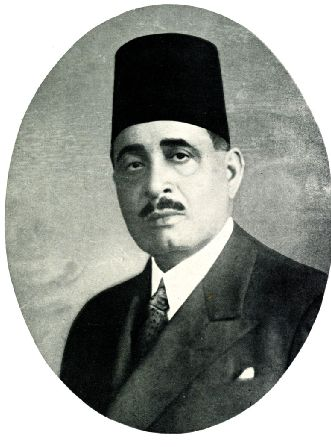
	First party	Second party
Leader	Saad Zaghloul	Adly Yakan Pasha
Party	Wafd	Liberal Constitutional
Seats won	171	29
Percentage	67.98%	19.03%
	Third party	Fourth party
Leader	Muhammad Hafiz Ramadan Pasha	Mohamed Tawfik Naseem Pasha
Party	National	Ittihad
Seats won	5	1
Percentage	1.95%	6.22%
Prime Minister before election
Ahmed Zeiwar Pasha
Independent
Subsequent Prime Minister
Adly Yakan Pasha
Liberal Constitutional

Parliamentary elections were held in Egypt on 22 May 1926. The result was a victory for the Wafd Party, which won 171 of the 211 seats.

The ruling Ittihad Party led by Prime Minister Ahmed Ziwar Pasha and Minister of Finance Yahya Ibrahim Pasha, while clinging to power, was too weak to carry out an effective campaign. It failed to nominate more than 66 candidates, fewer than the seats won by the Wafdists.

== Background ==
After the 1925 election, where a Wafdist majority parliament was dissolved by King Fuad in less than half a day, the Liberal Constitutional Party sought rapprochement with the Wafd Party. On 14 January 1926 an executive committee representing the National Party, the Wafd and the Liberal Constitutionalists was set up to discuss their response to the King and Ahmed Zeiwar's government. The National Party wanted the return on the 1925 parliament and a boycott of any future election, while the Wafdists and Liberals wanted new elections. However, when new elections were held on 22 May, the committee urged its voters to participate. These elections were the first held under newly relaxed financial requirements for voters, significantly increasing voter turnout compared to the previous election.

== Results ==
While all sources agree that the Wafd won the election, they differ on the seat totals. Deeb gives the results as Wafd 165, 29 Liberal constitutionalists, 5 Nationalists, and 5 Ittihadists. Quraishi puts the Wafdist total as 156 out of 214. Terry gives the same seat results as Khatib, except for the Ittihad and National parties, which she records as getting 1 and 29 seat respectively. Alaf Luftli Al-Sayyid Marsot and High Commissioner in Egypt Lord LLyod gives the totals as 144 for the Wafd, 28 for the Liberal Constitutionalists, 5 for the National party, 7 Ittihadists and 17 independents. The Political Handbook of the World; Parliaments, Parties and Press gives the results as Wafd 169, 29 Liberal constitutionalists and 12 for the minor parties.

Party	Votes	%	Seats	+/–
Wafd Party	771,737	67.98	171	+58
Liberal Constitutional Party	216,025	19.03	29	–11
Ittihad Party	70,643	6.22	1	–28
National Party	22,136	1.95	5	–2
Independents	54,723	4.82	5	–17
Total	1,135,264	100.00	211	0
Total votes	1,135,264	–		
Registered voters/turnout	1,792,171	63.35		
Source: Khatib

== Aftermath ==
The British government under Lord Lloyd involved themselves in the government formation process, refusing to accept Zaghloul as premier. In a meeting between Lloyd and Zaghloul on 30 May, Zaghloul told him were he to become premier, he would select Adly and Tharwat for posts in his cabinet. When Lloyd objected, Zaghloul told him "Vous pouvez vous renseigner" - French for "come and find out". When the meeting broke down, Lloyd used gunboat diplomacy, sending HMS Resolute to Alexandria on 2 June. In the end, Zaghloul acquiesced, citing health reasons.

== Sources ==
- Deeb, Marius (1979). Party Politics in Egypt: the Wafd & its Rivals 1919–1939. Ithaca Press. ISBN 9780903729406.
- Khatib, M.F. (1954). The working of parliamentary institutions in Egypt, 1924-1952 (Thesis). University of Edinburgh.
- Marsot, Afaf Lutfi Al-Sayyid (1977). Egypt’s Liberal Experiment: 1922–1936. University of California Press. ISBN 9780520031098.
- Quraishi, Zaheer M. (1967). Liberal Nationalism in Egypt; Rise and Fall of the Wafd Party. Jamal Printing Press. ISBN 9780861990009.
- Terry, Janice J. (1982). The Wafd: Cornerstone of Egyptian Political Power. Third World Centre for Research and Publishing. ISBN 9780861990009.
