= 1925 Egyptian parliamentary election =

- 23 March 1925
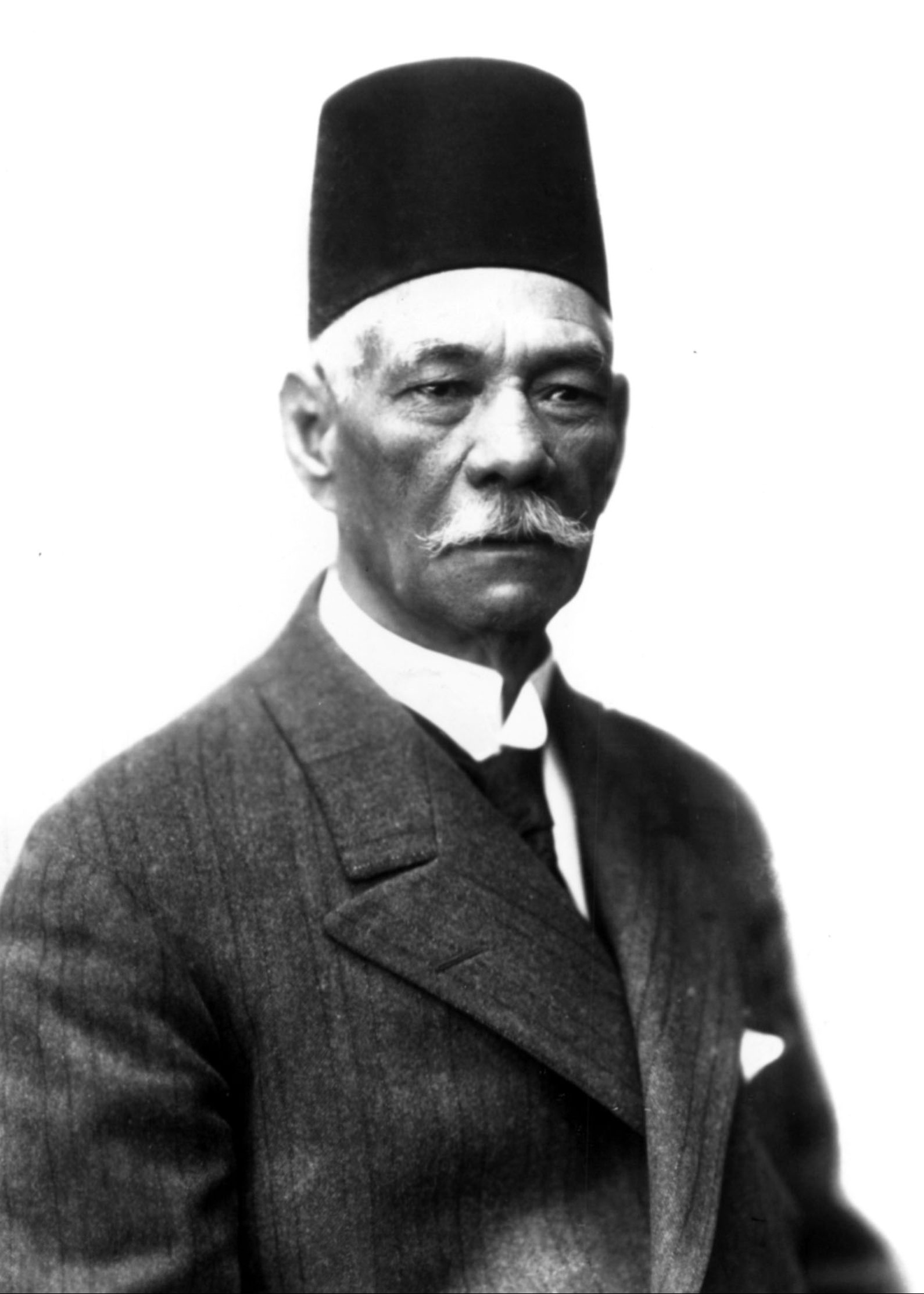

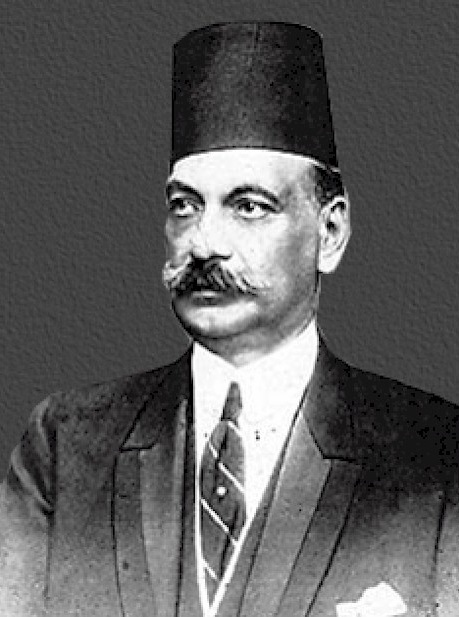

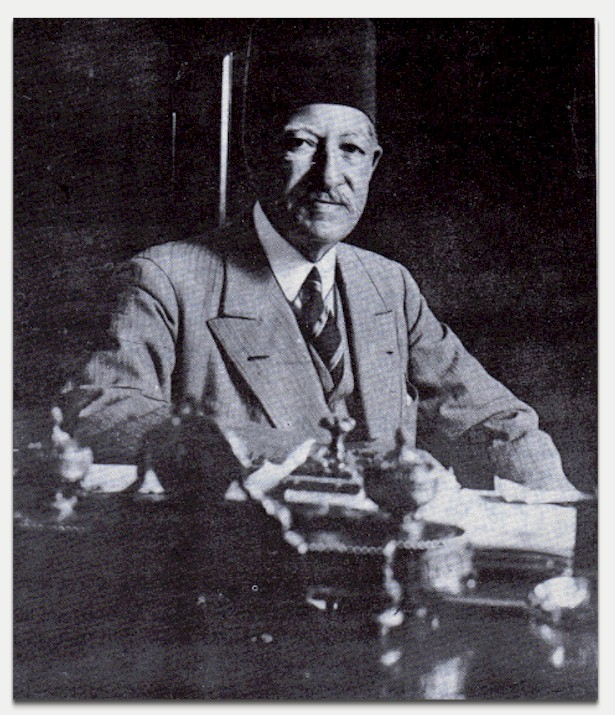
| | First party | Second party |
|---|---|---|
| Leader | Saad Zaghloul | Adly Yakan Pasha |
| Party | Wafd | Liberal Constitutional |
| Seats won | 113 | 40 |
| Percentage | 46.75% | 20.45% |
| | Third party | Fourth party |
| Leader | Yahya Ibrahim Pasha | Muhammad Hafiz Ramadan Pasha |
| Party | Ittihad | National |
| Seats won | 29 | 7 |
| Percentage | 17.03% | 4.35% |
Prime Minister before election
Ahmed Zeiwar Pasha
Independent
Subsequent Prime Minister
Ahmed Zeiwar Pasha
Independent

Parliamentary elections were held in Egypt on 23 March 1925. They saw the Wafd Party lose almost half of its seats.

== Background ==
Politics in Egypt at this time was divided into three main groups: the Wafd party, King Fuad I and his allies, and the British government. After the 1923–24 parliamentary elections the leader of the Wafd Party, Saad Zaghloul, became the prime minister. However, he was forced to resign on 24 November following the assassination of Lee Stack on 19 November, after an ultimatum by General Edmund Allenby. Ahmed Zeiwar Pasha formed a ministry after Zaghloul's resignation, proroguing parliament the next day. Parliament was officially dissolved on 24 December.

Ahead of the new elections, King Fuad created the Ittihad Party led by Yahya Ibrahim. Fuad also sought allies in the Liberal Constitutional Party and the National Party. The elections were supervised by Ismail Sidky, the new Minister of the Interior. Sidky tried to prevent the Wafd from winning by clamping down on the press as well as gerrymandering the districts to hinder Wafdist candidates. However, this did not stop the Wafd Party from obtaining a majority of the seats.

== Results ==
| Party | Votes | % | Seats | +/– |
|---|---|---|---|---|
| Wafd Party | 31,482 | 46.75 | 113 | –66 |
| Liberal Constitutional Party | 13,771 | 20.45 | 40 | +20 |
| Ittihad Party | 11,465 | 17.03 | 29 | New |
| National Party | 2,931 | 4.35 | 7 | 0 |
| Independents | 7,693 | 11.42 | 22 | +17 |
| Total | 67,342 | 100.00 | 211 | 0 |
| Total votes | 72,353 | – | | |
| Registered voters/turnout | 75,784 | 95.47 | | |
Source: Khatib

== Aftermath ==
The first and only act of parliament on the morning of 23 March 1925 was to vote to elect Zaghloul Speaker of the House by 123 votes to 85. Furious, King Fuad dissolved parliament in the afternoon. Parliament was in session for less than half a day.

== Sources ==
- Terry, Janice J. (1982). The Wafd: Cornerstone of Egyptian Political Power. Publisher: Third World Centre for Research and Publishing. ISBN 9780861990009.
- Deeb, Marius (1979). Party Politics in Egypt: the Wafd & its Rivals 1919–1939. Ithaca Press. ISBN 9780903729406.
- Quraishi, Zaheer M. (1967). Liberal Nationalism in Egypt; Rise and Fall of the Wafd Party. Jamal Printing Press. ISBN 9780861990009.
- Khatib, M.F (1954). The working of parliamentary institutions in Egypt, 1924-1952 (Thesis). University of Edinburgh.
