= Yahya Pasha =

Yahya Pasha may refer to:

- Hatibzade Yahya Pasha (died 1755), Ottoman statesman and admiral
- Yahya Ibrahim Pasha (1861–1936), Egyptian prime minister (1923–24)
- Abdel Fattah Yahya Pasha (died 1951), Egyptian prime minister (1933–34)
