= Abdel Khalek Sarwat Pasha =

Prime Minister of Egypt (1922, 1927–1928)

- عبد الخالق ثروت باشا
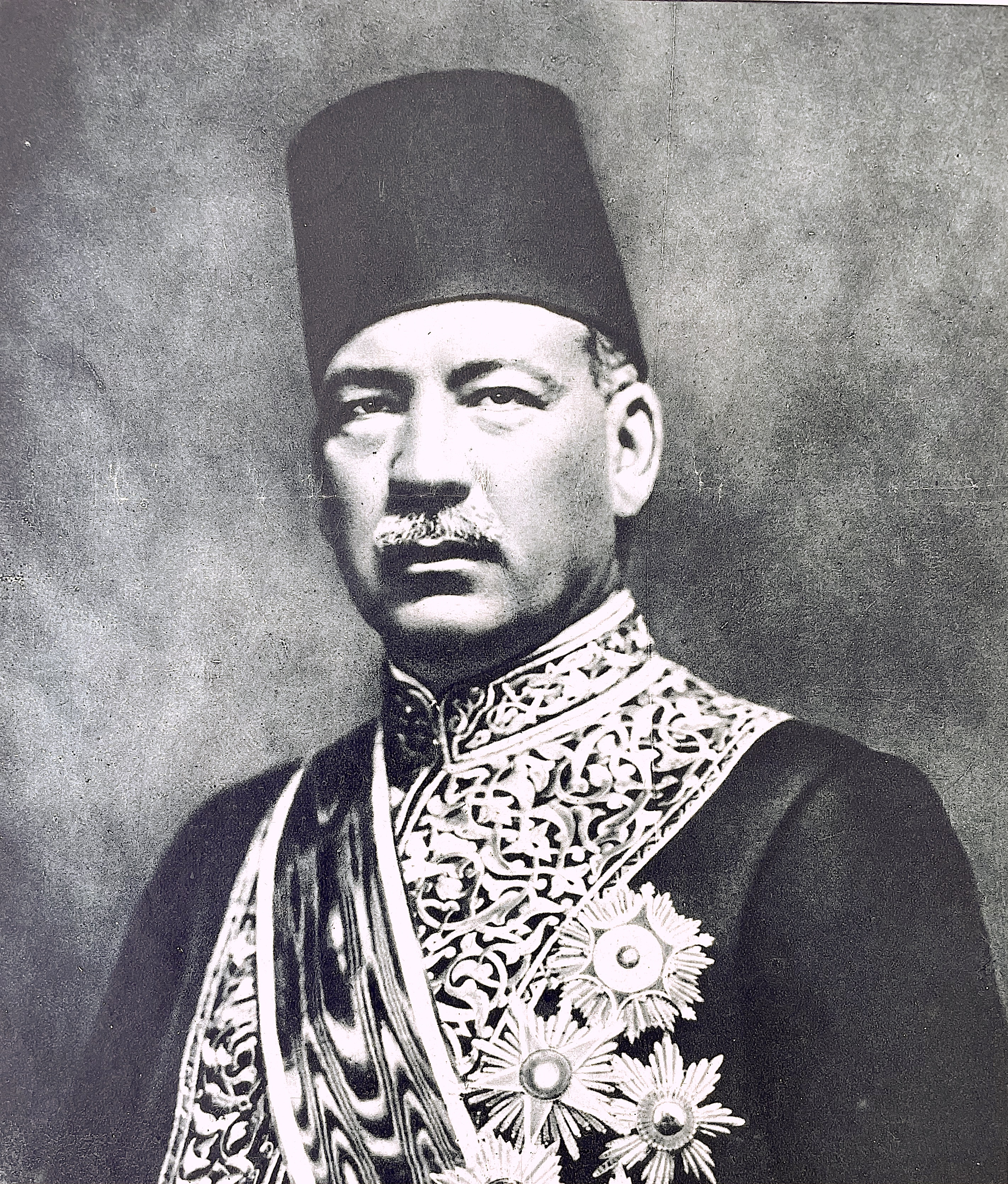

15th Prime Minister of Egypt
- In office 26 April 1927 – 16 March 1928
- Monarch: Fuad I
- Preceded by: Adly Yakan Pasha
- Succeeded by: Mostafa el-Nahhas
- In office 1 March 1922 – 30 November 1922
- Monarch: Fuad I
- Preceded by: Adly Yakan Pasha
- Succeeded by: Muhammad Tawfiq Nasim Pasha

Personal details
- Born: 1873
- Died: 1928 (aged 54–55)
- Party: Liberal Constitutional Party

Abdel Khalek Sarwat Pasha (Arabic: عبد الخالق ثروت باشا; 1873–1928) was an Egyptian political figure. Sarwat served as the Prime Minister of Egypt from 1 March 1922 until 30 November 1922, and again between 26 April 1927 and 16 March 1928. He was instrumental in bringing Great Britain to issue its Unilateral Declaration of Egyptian Independence in February 1922, which ended the British Protectorate of Egypt and recognized it to be an Independent Sovereign State. He was also Minister of Justice (1914–1919), Minister of Interior (16 March 1921 – 24 December 1921), Minister of Foreign Affairs (7 June 1926 – 18 April 1927) as well as the first Egyptian Attorney General (1908–1912).

Sarwat was born in Cairo in 1873. His father was Roznamji Egypt (Minister of Finance, in today's terms). He graduated with a License de droit from the Khedival School of Law in 1893 and spent the first 19 years of his career in the Ministry of Justice, following which he was appointed Minister of Justice (1914–1919). From 1918 and until his death, 10 years later, he became an important political figure in Egypt at a time when the country was struggling to obtain its full independence from Great Britain. He was close to a group of politicians who founded the Liberal Constitutional Party in October 1922, headed by Adly Yakan Pasha to whom Sarwat was very close. The party represented large land owners and the urban middle class. It had a gradualist approach to independence. The party was also joined by politicians who defected in 1921 from the Wafd, a movement formed in late 1918 to obtain the complete independence of Egypt from Great Britain and which was led by Saad Zaghloul Pasha, a popular charismatic leader who had the overwhelming support of the great majority of Egyptians.

In March 1919, soon after forming the Wafd, Saad was exiled to Malta by the British. This ignited the 1919 revolution. As a result, the British released Saad from exile, in April, and sent the Milner Mission to Egypt in December 1919 to study the situation. Saad and the Wafd were officially invited to London to negotiate (Saad-Milner negotiations). Adly joined the group. The negotiations (June – November 1920), broke down and highlighted a rift between Saad and Adly. This was a turning point for Saad. He became radicalized and relied mainly on popular support. Adly and Sarwat, both moderates, became the interlocutors of choice for the British in their future negotiations with Egypt.

Sarwat became minister of interior in a Adly Cabinet (March–December 1921) formed to follow-up on a British invitation to Egypt to enter official negotiations with Britain aiming at replacing the Protectorate with another relationship. Adly invited Saad to join him. Saad put unacceptable conditions to join and called for withdrawal of confidence in the Government. Several members of the Wafd, disagreeing with him, left the Wafd, confirming a split that was brewing. Sarwat was interim prime minister, while Adly was negotiating in London (Adly-Curzon negotiations, 1 July-5 December 1921), The negotiations failed and led to the resignation of Adly in December 1921. Sarwat put forward conditions which, upon their acceptance by Britain, he would be ready to form a cabinet. Despite Great Britain accepting these conditions, they were not enough for Saad and Adly. However, under pressure from Field Marshall Edmund Allenby, the British High Commissioner to Egypt, the British Government issued, on 28 February 1922, the Unilateral Declaration of Egyptian Independence, which declared Egypt an independent country ending the British protectorate, with reserved points making this a partial independence only. Sarwat became, on 1 March 1922, the first prime minister of the new Kingdom of Egypt and appointed himself Minister of Foreign Affair and Minister of the Interior. He formed a Committee to draft a Constitution which he proposed to King Fouad I, but the King pressured him to resign nine months later, as he was unwilling to promulgate a constitution, which would have diminished his powers.

The Constitution was promulgated later and the first election under it was a landslide victory for Saad's Wafd. Saad became prime minister in January 1924, but a crisis forced him to resign 10 months later and allowed the king to create a situation where, as of 18 March 1925, the country was ruled unconstitutionally. After 11 months of unconstitutional rule, the political parties convened a National Congress let by Saad, with Adly and Sarwat sitting beside him, which resulted in the return of constitution rule. Sarwat became Minister of Foreign Affair in a so-called coalition cabinet let by Adly (7 June 1926 – 18 April 1927). Following the resignation of Adly, Sarwat became prime Minister of a second coalition cabinet on 26 March 1927 and kept the Ministry of Foreign Affairs to himself. He diffused a major crisis between Egypt and Britain, the so-called Army crisis. He also entered into negotiations with Britain (Sarwat-Chamberlain negotiations) on the reserved points of the Declaration. While Sarwat was negotiating in London, Saad died in Egypt. His successor at the helm of the Wafd was a hardliner. The draft treaty brought back by Sarwat was rejected by both the Wafd and the Cabinet and he resigned on 16 March 1928. He died in Paris on 22 September 1928 at the age of 55.

== Early life and education (1873–1893) ==
Abdel Khalek Sarwat was born in Cairo on 31 March 1873. His family traces its origin to Anatolia (Asian part of today's Turkey). His father, Ismail Abdel Khalek Pasha, was Roznamji Egypt (Minister of Finance, in today's terms). Sarwat graduated from the Khedival School of Law, first of his class, in 1893 with a License de droit.

== Judicial career (1893–1919) ==
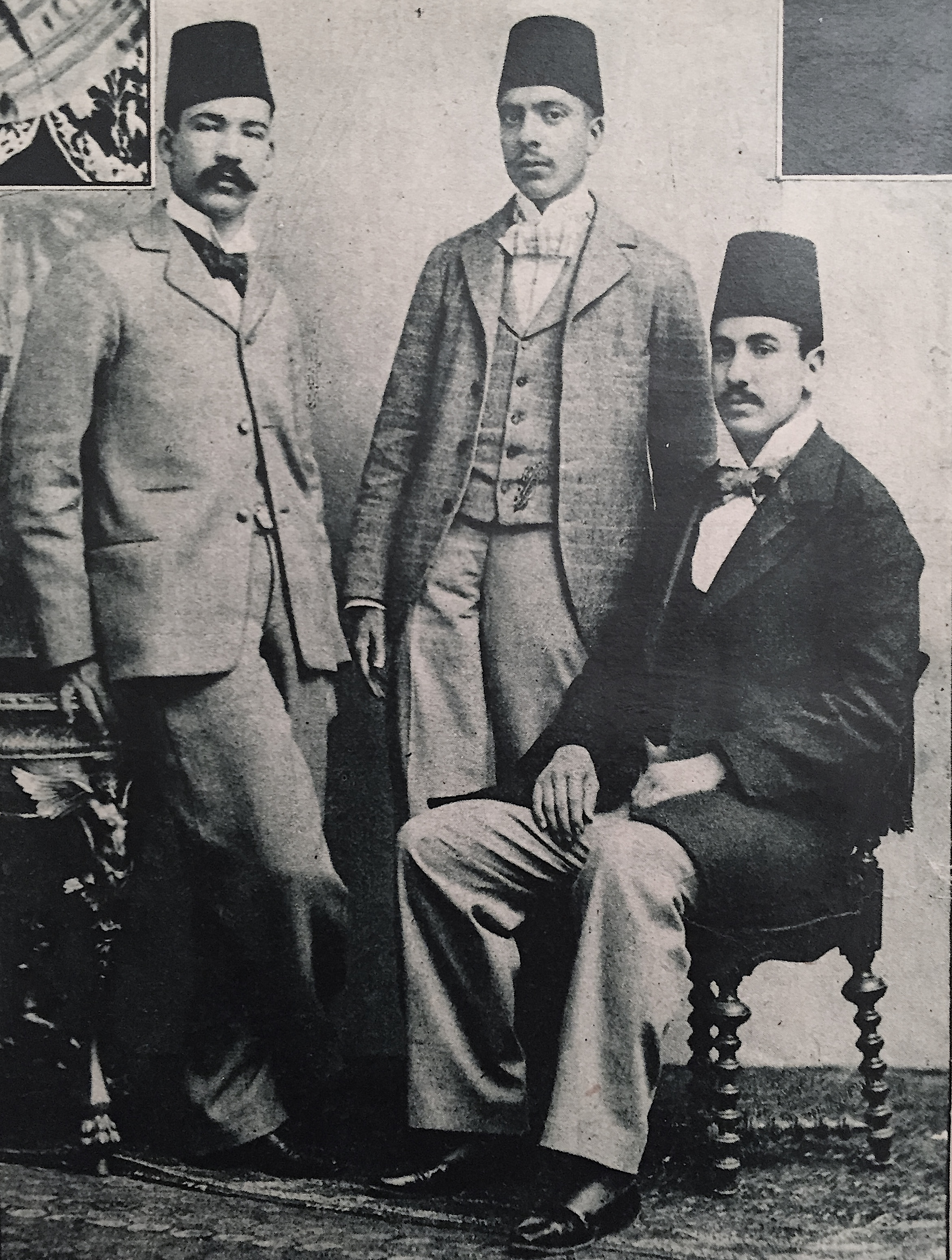
Abdel Khalek Sarwat (standing left) c.1895

Sarwat started his career in 1893, at the age of 20. He spent his first 26 years in the Ministry of Justice, holding, among others, the positions of District Attorney, Judge and Attorney General. In 1914 he became Minister of Justice (5 April 1914 – 22 April 1919). Sir John Scott, the Judicial Advisor in the Ministry appointed young Sarwat as his secretary. The Judicial Advisor at that time was the representative of the British Government in the Egyptian Ministry of Justice who, as such, was more powerful than the Minister. This position, ingratiated Sarwat with the British, who came to appreciate his honesty and competence and gave him significant authority early in his career. According to Mohamed Hussein Heikal “The influence and confidence Sarwat was able to hold allowed him to stand in the Ministry of Justice as the main decision maker while still a young man of not even twenty-five”. During this period, he was appointed Secretary to the Judicial Audit Committee of the Ministry.

=== Attorney General (1908–1912) ===
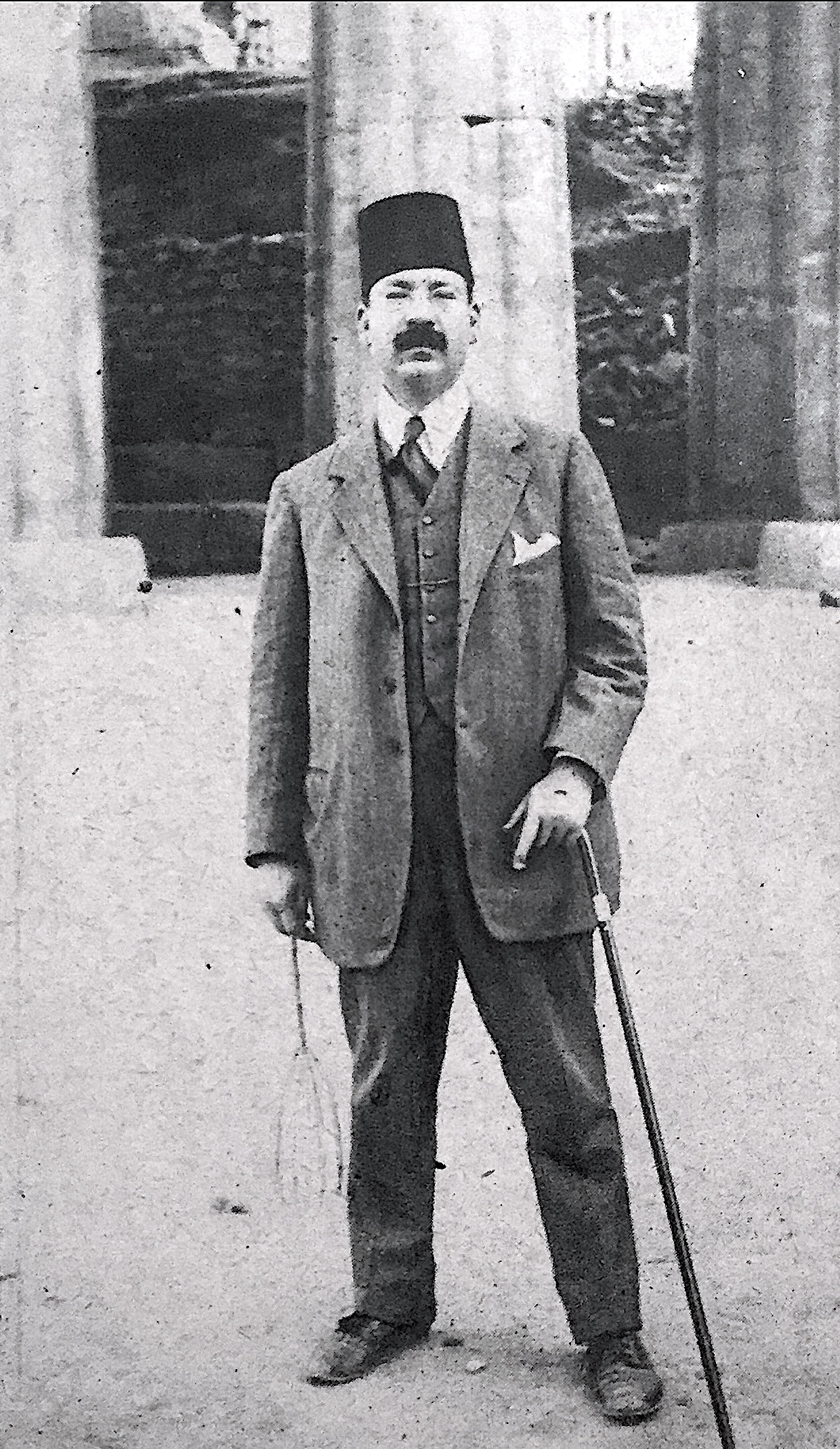
Abdel Khalek Sarwat in Luxor, c.1912, visiting prosecution offices in upper Egypt

In 1912, at the age of 39, Sarwat became, the first Egyptian to hold the position of Attorney General since the British occupation. He was recommended by Saad Zaghlul Pasha, who became later his political foe and who was, at that time, Minister of Justice (1906–1913). Saad's recommendation was made despite objections from the Khedive, from the British and from his colleagues among ministers. The ministers’ objection was that Sarwat had been secretary to two (British) Judicial Advisors. As Attorney General, Sarwat became under pressure to prosecute the newspaper El Jarida, which was headed by Ahmed Lutfi El Sayed and which defended individual liberties and the supremacy of the Law. Sarwat's reaction to the pressure to prosecute was “No law justifies the prosecution they are demanding, yet their insistence on prosecution had them seek justification from laws which do not apply to Egypt, including Indian laws”.

=== Minister of Justice (1914–1919) ===
Sarwat was Minister of Justice (5 April 1914 – 22 April 1919) in the successive cabinets headed by Hussein Roshdi Pasha. As Minister, he introduced laws and amendments giving protections to the accused and introduced guidelines for appeals.

== Egypt's road to the 1922 Declaration of Independence ==
Sarwat was instrumental in the events leading to the British Unilateral Declaration of Egyptian Independence, a historical moment in modern Egypt. The road to the Declaration was long and tumultuous.

=== Background ===
At the beginning of World War I, the British Government unilaterally declared Egypt, which it was occupying since 1882, a British Protectorate (18 December 1914). By the end of the war, consequences of the war and the protectorate began to appear on both the Egyptian and British political scenes.

In Egypt, the Egyptian nationalist movement which has been growing among intellectuals before the war found a larger support among average Egyptians who suffered during the war from high inflation and from their forced recruitment into the Labor Corps (About half a million ). The nationalist movement also found support in US President Woodrow Wilson’s declaration on Self-determination. In Great Britain, the war made the Government more sensitive to the importance of Egypt as a strategic asset, but it also put financial strains on the Empire. Britain was now looking for an arrangement to control the Egypt at a lesser cost and a lower level of military commitments, while safeguarding its route to India and protecting the interests of foreigners living in the country.

Political developments during this period reflected the interaction between the major protagonists. On the British side, Lloyd George, the British prime minister, had to consider his country's political climate. He was assisted by his Foreign Secretary, Lord George Curzon, who would become the lead British negotiator with an Egyptian delegation. A no less important figure was Field Marshall Edmond Allenby, who was made Special High Commissioner of Egypt (based in Cairo) in 1919. Allenby had a crucial role in shaping the issues and convincing the British Government to unilaterally declare the independence of Egypt. On the Egyptian side, Saad Zaghlul Pasha, who was seen as the national populist leader, ultimately demanded the full independence of Egypt, including the evacuation of British troops. To serve this goal, he did not hesitate to use wide popular demonstrations. Adly Yakan Pasha and Sarwat Pasha, who initially supported Saad, were moderates and hence became in constant conflict with Saad. This situation reflected their different support bases: the large masses for Saad and the ruling class for Adly and Sarwat.

=== Creation of the Wafd and the 1919 Revolution ===
On 13 November 1918, two days after the First World War armistice was signed, Saad, who had held a prominent position in the Legislative Assembly before it was dissolved in 1914, and two others ex-members had a historical one-hour meeting with Sir Reginald Wingate, the British High Commissioner of Egypt. They first expressed their belief that they represented Egypt because of their previous membership in the legislative assembly. Saad then said: “When England will have helped us obtaining our complete independence, we will give her reasonable guarantees that no country will control our independence nor touch England's interest. We will guarantee her [England's] road to India, which is the Suez Canal, by giving her the exclusive right to occupy it [the Canal] when necessary. We will also ally with her [England] against third parties and give her, when necessary, what the alliance needs in terms of soldiers.” He also said: “We are talking about these demands here with you as a personification of this great nation [Britain] and we are addressing here [in Egypt] no one other than you and outside [of Egypt] no one other than England state's men, and we ask you [...] to help up realize these demands”.

Saad historical meeting was organized with the prior knowledge of and in agreement with Prime Minister Roshdi, who met with Saad immediately after the meeting and met Wingate afterward, on the same day. Roshdi found the High Commissioner surprised that three people could talk in the name of a Nation. He reported this to Saad Zaghlul and encouraged him to move forward with his project.

From then on, events unfolded quickly. On the same day, 13 November 1918, and after the meeting with Wingate, Saad met with a few supporters and Al-Wafd-Al-Masry (the Egyptian Delegation) (“Wafd”) was created with Saad as head plus six members. Its members approved its constitution, on 23 November 1918, which stated, among other things, that its mission was to seek the complete independence of Egypt using legal and peaceful means. The wafd then went on to collect powers of attorney from a diverse swath of the population, across the country, with the British opposing this initiative. It also enlarged it membership. On 20 November, Saad asked the British military authorities, as it was usually required, for permission for him and members of the Wafd to travel to Britain. On 1 December, he received a negative reply from the High Commissioner, after the later consulted his government.

From his side, Roshdi, requested, on 13 November, permission from the High Commissioner to travel to London, accompanied by Adly, his minister of Foreign Affairs, and Saad Zaghloul, to discuss with the government of Britain the wishes of the Government of Egypt regarding Egypt's future. While favorable to the travel of Roshdy and Adly, the High Commissioner was pressured by London to reply that it was not appropriate for Roshdy or Adly to travel at this time and that Saad Zaghloul was not permitted to travel. Roshdi's reaction was to submit the resignation of his cabinet to the Sultan the next day, 2 December 1918, giving as reason, the refusal of Britain to allow the Wafd to travel to Britain. The resignation was only accepted three months later, on 1 March 1919.

Following the resignation of Roshdi, Sarwat, who was Minister of Justice in the resigned cabinet, was offered to succeed him as prime minister with the hope that he would convince Saad to backtrack from his plan to represent Egypt in London. Sarwat declined the offer, despite being told that this would stand in the way of him ever becoming prime minister. Shortly after, the Wafd led by Saad, visited Sarwat at his home to congratulate him on his stance.

Soon after the November 13 meeting with Sir Wingate and the formation of the Wafd, Saad initiated public protests, and, after he was refused to travel, expressed his protests to plenipotentiaries of Foreign countries in Egypt about the British Government's policy, thus breaking his promise to the High Commissioner to talk to Britain only. He also sent three cables to US President Wilson. “The Wafd activities were now considered by the British authorities as dangerous to public security”. On 6 March, he was given an ultimatum by the Head of British Forces in Egypt and, on 8 March, he and three of his associates were arrested by the British authorities in Cairo and exiled to Malta.

What became known as the 1919 revolution started effectively the next day, on 9 March 1919. It was a major development in the history of Modern Egypt which none of the protagonists could ignore. The revolution was a series of revolts, spanning the whole country, which extended from 9 March 1919 until about the end of the year. It was bloody, (according the British there were 1000 dead by 15 May) and caused important destructions and disruptions. The revolution would affect Egypt's political evolution for the next decade.

An immediate consequence of the revolution was that Field Marshal Edmond Allenby, the newly appointed (on 21 March) High Commissioner freed Saad from exile and, on 7 April, allowed all Egyptians, including Saad's Wafd, to travel. Saad did not return to Egypt (he was not to return for another two years), but traveled to Paris, where he was joined, on 19 April, by members of the Wafd after they were allowed to travel. He was unable to achieve much at the Paris Peace Conference, as US President Wilson recognized the British protectorate of Egypt and the US-German Peace Treaty had been published. The latter transferred the powers of Turkey over Egypt to Britain, forcing the acceptance by Germany of the British protectorate of Egypt. The Wafd, which until then was focusing on getting international recognition of the Independence of Egypt, from then on reoriented its actions exclusively to the inside of Egypt.

=== The Milner Mission ===
Another consequence of the 1919 Revolution was the announcement on 15 May 1919, by the British Government, that a mission would travel to Egypt “To enquire into the causes of the late disorder in Egypt and to report on [...] the form of the Constitution which, under the Protectorate, will be best calculated to promote its peace and prosperity, [...]”. The Milner Mission, headed by Colonial Secretary Alfred Milner, spent about three months in Egypt (7 December 1919 – 18 March 1920). The arrival of Mission was immediately boycotted by a large portion of Egyptians, including the Wafd, on the basis that keeping the protectorate was not acceptable.

On 29 December 1919, three weeks after its arrival, the Mission backtracked and issued a declaration stating “The Mission has been sent out by the British Government, with the approval of Parliament, to reconcile the aspiration of the Egyptian people with the special interests which Britain has in Egypt and with a maintenance of the legitimate rights of all foreign residents in the country”. A version that overlooked the protectorate status mentioned in its terms of reference. This declaration resulted, from the boycott of the Mission by a majority of Egyptians and helped the trio of ex-ministers Adly, Rushdi and Sarwat who indicated to the Mission the necessity of agreeing with the Wafd. Saad, who was in Paris, was pleased with the nature of these communications as per a letter date 27 January 1920. Following the Mission's latest declaration, the trio expressed their support of it. Sarwat made a statement to a newspaper indicating that “We consider that the Declaration of Lord Milner opened to us a door that was closed until now. [...] the declaration of Lord Milner is fair when it stated clearly that the negotiations will be without restrictions. [...] Entering into negotiation with the Mission cannot be interpreted under any circumstance as a concession to the Nation's demand and Lord Milner's declaration regarding this point is clear.” The Wafd Central Committee did not endorse the trio's views and demanded in advance of any negotiation, the “recognition of the complete independence of Egypt”. Saad, who was in Paris, would not insist on the precondition.

This was followed by multiple discussions between three parties: Lord Millner, the Wafd Central Committee and the trio of ex-ministers. Two recommendations were sent to Saad in Paris: one by the trio of ex-ministers urging Saad to come back to Egypt to negotiate with the Mission and a contrary one by the Wafd Central Committee. Despite further mediation by Adly, Saad decided not to return to Egypt. Lord Milner realizing that his mission would not succeed unless Saad represented Egypt, invited Saad to London. Adly joined Saad in Paris on 22 April to discuss. In May and after many deliberations, the Milner Mission invited the Wafd for negotiations in London (as opposed to an invitation to Saad alone to discuss with Milner). Adly accompanied the delegation.

The negotiations between the Wafd and the Milner Mission in London (Saad-Milner negotiations) lasted about five months (June – November 1920). A British proposal was made and did not explicitly mention the end of the protectorate. Saad made a counterproposal, which explicitly mentioned the end of the protectorate. This fundamental disagreement almost ended the negotiation, except for the intervention of Adly. The latter continued the negotiations without Saad for three weeks starting 25 July 1920, resulting in a final take-all-or-leave British proposal presented to Saad on 10 August. It which included the British recognition of the independence of Egypt as a constitutional monarchy with representative institutions. It allowed the presence of British troops in Egypt, but not as an occupying force. It did not explicitly mention the end of the protectorate and also removed some of the benefits to Egypt included in the first proposal. Saad was not pleased with the proposal, but seeing a division in the Wafd, with Adly and his supporters favorable to the final proposal, he would not reject it and opted to send it to the Egyptian people for consultation. Saad wrote to the Nation a neutral letter about the proposal, when, in reality, he was unhappy about it as he indicated in a letter to three members of the Wafd “it is (between you and me) a proposal which in appearance accepts the independence, but in reality, confirms the protectorate”. While “the members of the Wafd [who travelled from London back to Egypt], as a group, where not only interpreters of the rules of the proposal but proponents and supporters of it”, the general feedback from the one-month consultation of the Egyptian people was that there were reservations on the proposal, some of which were tantamount to refusing the proposal. The negotiations resumed in London in October. The Wafd expressed on 25 October 1920 to Lord Milner seven reservations it had about the proposal, the first and most important demanded the end of the protectorate. After lengthy deliberations at the House of Lords, Milner met with Saad on 9 November 1920 to inform him that no more compromises were possible. The negotiations were interrupted on that day and the Wafd left London for Paris the next day.

In Paris, the rift within the Wafd (Saad/Adly) gained momentum and became known, but was kept under the lid. The Adly camp, to which Sarwat belonged, wanted to continue the negotiations, while Saad thought it was time to go back to Cairo and focus the wafd on organizing the Nation's revolution. This became a turning point for Saad, who until then was moderate in his views and actions. The breakdown of the Milner negotiations made him lose hope in negotiation as a mean to help the Egyptian cause. His only option now was to rely on his popularity to lead the National movement.

Lord Milner presented his mission's report to His Majesty's Government on 9 December 1920 in which it stated that “the time is appropriate to establish relations between Great Britain and Egypt on the basis of a permanent treaty, which is a treaty that gives Egypt its independence”. The report was released on 18 February 1921.

=== Split within the Wafd ===
On 26 February 1921, the British Government (Cabinet of Lloyd George) advised Fouad I, the Sultan of Egypt that "His Majesty's Government, after a study of the proposals made by Lord Milner, have arrived at the conclusion that the status of protectorate is not a satisfactory relation in which Egypt should continue to stand to Great Britain” and invited Egypt to enter into official negotiations to replace the Protectorate by another relationship. This was the most important communication made by the British Government since its declaration of the protectorate in 1914. The Sultan directed Adly to form a cabinet (his first) on 17 March 1921, with the purpose of entering into these negotiations. Sarwat was appointed Minister of the Interior.

Saad was still in Paris having not yet returned to Egypt since his release, two years earlier, from his one-month exile. Adly invited him to join a delegation to be formed to negotiate with Britain. From Paris, Saad laid down four conditions for his participation. Adly found unacceptable the condition that Wafd should nominate the majority of the delegation's members and head the delegation. Saad returned to Egypt on 5 April 1921, in the middle of an effusion of popular support. On 25 April 1921, Adly made public, in a newspaper, his refusal of Saad's conditions. On the same day, Saad made public his insistence on leading the delegation in a speech in which he announced his non-confidence in the cabinet. Three days later, in a meeting with the Wafd's members, Saad insisted that the Wafd, despite its majority dissenting, withdraws its confidence in the cabinet. As a result, a group of members of Saad's Wafd Party split from the party. The split in the Wafd was now totally consumed. Chaos and violence erupted in the country: On 20 May, two police stations were burned and 58 people were killed in Alexandria, among them 15 Europeans. The British military authorities had to take over the administration of the city.

=== Sarwat Minister of Interior (1921) ===
On 1 July 1921, an official delegation headed by Prime Minister Adly, left for London (without Saad) to conduct negotiations with Lord George Curzon (Adly-Curzon negotiations), the British Foreign Secretary in the Cabinet of Lloyd George. The negotiations lasted several months, during which Sarwat was interim prime minister, in addition to being Minister of the Interior. While the early severe disturbances in Alexandria happened under his watch, he was effective in maintaining order during the Adly-Curzon negotiations and succeeded in preventing disturbances from derailing the negotiations.

He tried unsuccessfully to prevent Saad from touring the country to criticize Adly and the British Government. When he heard that four Labour Party (opposition party) members of the British House of Common were planning to visit Egypt and accompany Saad on part of his tour of the country, Sarwat “besought the High Commissioner to prevent it”, but to no avail. He also sought the help of the British Military authority to act based on the prevailing Martial law in another situation against the President of the National Party.

=== Adly-Curzon negotiations ===
On 10 November 1921, Curzon presented to Adly a draft treaty. Adly replied in a November 15 memorandum stating that the project did not hold a hope for reaching an agreement. He left London and arrived in Alexandria on 5 December. In fact, “The negotiations had broken down chiefly on two points: the maintenance of a British garrison in Egypt and the control of Egyptian Foreign Affairs”

The British authorities in Egypt, had also their point of view on the negotiations. First, the British Advisors in Egypt wrote, on 17 November, a common memorandum asserting that “any decision which does not accept the principle of independence and keeps the protectorate will inevitably lead to a real danger of a revolution starting in the whole country”. Allenby forwarded the memorandum to Lord Curzon with his support. Second, as Adly arrived in Cairo on 6 November 1921, Allenby asked Curzon, through a despatch “if he could advise the Sultan that his Majesty's Government was ready to execute [...] the main proposals [...] included in the proposed treaty and to extend to him these suggestions as a program for a new Government, or for the current one if it stayed in place? I fully realize that the work I am pointing to may force his Majesty's Government to end the Protectorate with a unilateral declaration”, a precursor to the upcoming unilateral declaration.

=== Resignation of Adly and exile of Saad Zaghlul ===
Prime Minister Adly resigned on 8 December, three days after his arrival in Cairo. Sultan Fouad did not accept his resignation and asked him to stay on until a new cabinet was formed. The failure of the Adly mission led to riots across the country. The day before Adly resigned, Saad called on the country to continue fighting. In reaction to Saad's continued activism, the British military authority warned him, on 22 December, not to hold public meetings or write in the press and ordered him to leave Cairo and stay in the countryside. Saad responded on the same day by a speech in which he said “the force can do with us whatever it wishes”. The next day, Allenby arrested Saad and froze his and his party's bank accounts, as well as those of prominent members of his party. On the same day, Adly, not wanting to be held responsible for the arrest of Saad, asked the Sultan to accept the resignation he submitted two weeks earlier. It was accepted the next day, 24 December 1921. A few days later, the British authorities decided to exile Saad (for the second time) and five of his colleagues to the Seychelles islands. They left Egypt on 29 December 1921.

Saad's exile resulted in the reunification of his previously split Wafd and the organization of a campaign to boycott and to not cooperate with British persons and British interests in Egypt. A wave of violence and assassinations erupted throughout the country.

=== Sarwat's conditions to form a cabinet ===
Subsequent to Adly's resignation, Sarwat announced, on 11 December, that he would be ready to form a cabinet if eleven conditions, which he made public, were accepted by Britain. They included that the British Protectorate be abolished, the sovereign independence of Egypt recognized and the Ministry of Foreign affair reconstituted. The Wafd criticized these conditions as they did not include the evacuation of British forces from Egypt. Despite Great Britain accepting his conditions on 15 December, Sarwat, could not form a cabinet as he was unable to secure the support of Adly, who asserted that the demanded concessions “did not go far enough”.

In his endeavor, Sarwat had the full support of Allenby, the British High commissioner, who was pushing to obtain from his Government firm concessions. On 12 January 1922, Allenby sent Curzon, the Foreign Secretary, the draft of a letter he recommended to be sent to the Sultan of Egypt “to announce that His Majesty's Government were prepared without waiting for a treaty to abolish the Protectorate and recognize Egyptian sovereign independence: that they would "view with favor" the creation of a parliament with the right to control the "policy and administration of a constitutionally responsible government”." The despatch, which accompanied the proposed letter indicated that “the proposed letter is the result of extensive negotiations with Sarwat Pasha and his immediate adherents. They, on their part, have been in contact with a wider circle, and Adly Pasha has been in close touch, and has lent valuable and disinterested assistance” Not getting a prompt response, Allenby sent Curzon, two weeks later, a despatch which included a resignation threat: “if the advice I have offered is rejected, I cannot honorably remain. I therefore beg that my resignation may be tendered to His Majesty with expression of my humble duty.” He was called back to London to explain his position to Curzon and left Cairo on 3 February, accompanied by two of his advisors. In London, with his possible resignation still looming, he was able to obtain the support of Prime Minister Lloyd George despite the opposition of Curzon, the Foreign Office Secretary. On 17 February, the Cabinet approved the end of the protectorate.

Eleven days later, Allenby arrived in Cairo with, in hand, the British Declaration of Egyptian Independence, which became known as the Declaration of 28 February 1922.

=== The Declaration of Independence ===
On 28 February 1922, the British High Commissioner in Egypt, Lord Allenby made public the following Declaration:

“Whereas His Majesty's Government, in accordance with their declared intentions, desire forthwith to recognize Egypt as an independent sovereign state; and whereas the relations between His Majesty's Government and Egypt are of vital interest to the British Empire; the following principles are hereby declared:

1. The British Protectorate over Egypt is terminated, and Egypt is declared to be an independent Sovereign State.
2. So soon as the Government of His Highness shall pass an act of indemnity with application to all inhabitants of Egypt, Martial Law as proclaimed on the 2nd of November 1914 shall be withdrawn.
3. The following matters are absolutely reserved to the discretion of His Majesty's Government until such time as it may be possible by free discussion and friendly accommodation on both sides to conclude agreements in regards thereto between His Majesty's Government and the Government of Egypt:
  - The security and communications of the British empire in Egypt.
  - The defense of Egypt against all foreign aggression or interference direct or indirect.
  - The protection of Foreign interest in Egypt and the protection of minorities.
  - The Sudan.

Pending the conclusion of such agreements the status quo in all these matters shall remain intact.”

The four matters reserved in the declaration became the expression of past and future political divergence within Egypt. For the Wafd the four matters reflected the ill will of the British Government that handed Egypt an independence that was one only on paper. For the politicians who will become members of the Liberal Constitutional Party and their supporters, it was a step in the right direction.

For the next fifteen years or so, seeking an agreement as per point 3 of the declaration was the main objective of both the Wafd and the LCP, each going about it according to its own political beliefs.

== First Sarwat cabinet (1922) ==
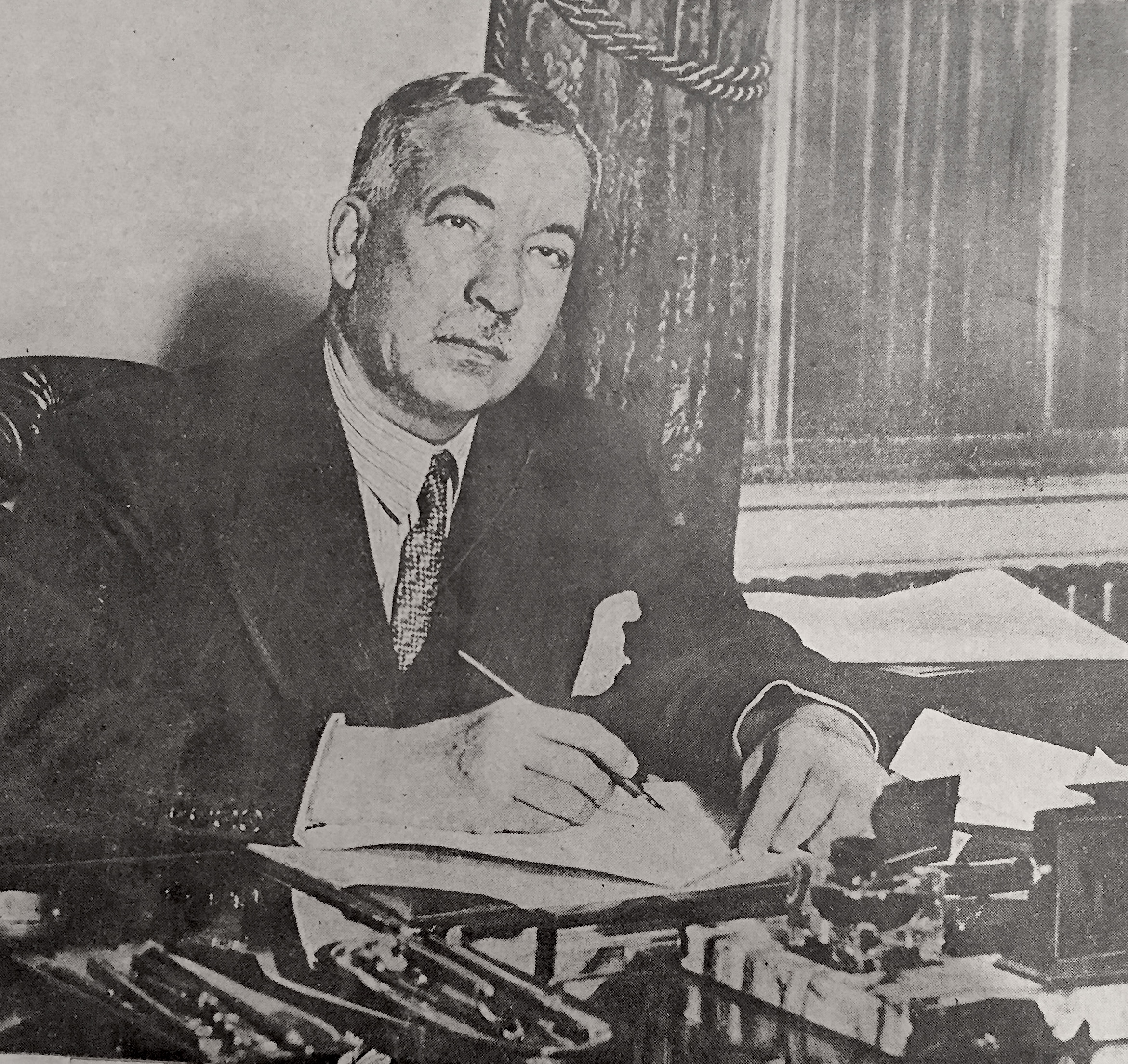
Sarwat at his desk in the Egyptian legation in London (1927)

On 1 March 1922, Abdel Khalek Sarwat Pasha was asked by the Sultan to form a cabinet. In his acceptance letter, submitted on the same day, Sarwat laid out the program of his Cabinet: the preparation of a draft Constitution based on the principles of the General Law, which will assert the accountability of the Government to a representative body, the end of martial law, elections which are to be held in normal circumstances and the reinstatement of a Ministry of Foreign Affair, which will establish political and consular representation of Egypt abroad. He also listed the name of the eight ministers of his cabinet, keeping to himself the ministries of interior and Foreign Affairs.

Two weeks later, on 15 March 1922, the Sultan officially proclaimed the independence of Egypt and assumed the title “His Majesty, the King of Egypt”. The Cabinet re-created the ministry of Foreign affairs, which was abolished during the protectorate (1914–1922), canceled the official holidays on the birthday of the King of Britain and on his Coronation Day. The position of Adviser to the Minister of Interior, held by a British, was abolished and the British Financial Advisor ceased to attend Cabinet meetings. Egyptian Deputy Ministers were appointed to replace the British ones.

The announcement of Egypt's independence was not well received by its people. “The announcement aroused no popular enthusiasm and the Zaghloulists attitude was everywhere of sullen dissatisfaction and hostility. [...]. The proclamation of independence was accompanied by disorderly demonstrations in large towns”.

=== Committee on the Constitution ===
On 3 April 1922, the Cabinet created a Committee to draft a constitution and an election law. It was headed by Rushdy Pasha and had thirty members, excluding the chairman and the vice chairman, and was hence called the “Committee of the Thirty”. Its members were thinkers, men of the law, scientists, religious officials, moderate politicians, landowners, merchants and financiers. The Wafd was invited to nominate two or three members but refused the invitation. It gave two reasons for its refusal: first, the number of members offered to the Wafd was too small and, second, he demanded that an elected constituent Assembly rather than a committee write the constitution. The Committee was nicknamed “Committee of the Naughties” by its opponents.

Defenders of the constituent Assembly idea used, as one of their argument, the promise made in the program of Adly's Cabinet, formed in 1921, that drafting of a constitution was to be assigned to a national constituent Assembly. Sarwat was a member of this Cabinet. The partial answer to their argument, made by Sarwat in his speech to the Committee on the Constitution, on 11 April 1922, is a good illustration of the political climate of the times. Sarwat explained that the purpose of the constituent Assembly mentioned in the program of Adly's cabinet was but primarily to review any treaty with Britain and, then, draft a constitution. Now the situation was reversed. Drafting a constitution preceded any eventual treaty with Britain (the declaration of independence being unilateral and not a treaty). He then said, referring to the Wafd: “There are individuals who have been working for a while on promoting bad faith towards the Government, on minimizing the importance of where the country has arrived at and on seeding doubt about what we are about to encounter, so that if a national constituent Assembly met, it would be engulfed in these views and tendencies and its work would revert to opposition, obsessions and abeyance leading to evil consequences for the country. This, in spite of the country having obtained an important gain from the Declaration of Independence and its recognition by other countries. Save that the Egyptian question has not been settled yet, as there are still ahead of us negotiations which must enable Egypt to arrive at its full potential ...”.

Two views soon appeared within the committee; one willing to give the King enough rights to control partisan excesses and the other defending the principle that the people are the source of all powers. Rushdy, the chairman, who was close to Sarwat, tried to find a middle solution. While he was, like Sarwat, a defender of a representative democracy, he was also much aware that removing too many powers from the King would doom the exercise to failure. The King, who never liked the idea of Egypt becoming a constitutional monarchy, put pressure on Sarwat to refrain from including clauses that would diminish his powers. Sarwat, who had a strong personality, and was not such a person as to be led by the King did not accommodate all his demands. In addition, “The King had never been on friendly terms with Sarwat Pasha, who was not the Prime Minister of his choice”. By the end of July 1922, the relationship between them had soured to the point that “the High Commissioner [Lord Allenby] intervened to insist on a rapprochement with Sarwat”.

Sensing that the King was planning to remove him, Sarwat pressured the committee to finish its work. On 31 October 1922, the Committee presented to Prime Minister Sarwat a draft Constitution and a draft Election Law. Sarwat sent the draft constitution, for promulgation, to the King who was not keen to do that.

=== Assassinations and Government reaction ===
From the day the Sarwat cabinet was formed, Egypt found itself in the midst of a wave of assassinations which lasted several months and presented serious problems to the Government. There were many reasons for this instability. The Wafd was against the Declaration of Independence, the population also disliked it and Saad was in exile when all of this happened. Importantly, Sarwat was never popular, as he represented the ruling class and, as a matter of temperament, was not the type to seek popularity from the masses. There was even an assassination attempt against him planned for January 26, 1922, following rumors that he would be appointed prime minister. Seven plotters were arrested and tried by a British military tribunal. Three of them were sentenced to between two- and three-year prison terms.

Starting March 1922, following the appointment of the Sarwat Cabinet, there were seven assassinations attempts in a short period of time, which resulted in the death or serious injuries of British Employees in the Egyptian government. The perpetrators were not found. These unpunished assassinations led the British Government to officially object, through its High Commissioner to the Government of Egypt, “considering it responsible for these attacks and reserving the right to assess the suitability of the amount of compensation to be paid by the Government” Nevertheless, the assassination attempts continued until at least August 1922, despite a second strong letter sent by Allenby on July 20. It is worth mentioning that “On July 24 the Wafd made a false move in publishing a manifesto which directly counselled violence against the Ministry, and its supporters the British. Lord Allenby at once ordered the arrest of the signatories of this manifesto”. Saad was still in exile at that time.

In response to the numerous assassinations and to the British objections, Sarwat, who was Minister of the Interior in his own Cabinet, took a number of repressive measures. He prohibited anti-government political meetings, permanently closed two newspapers, temporary stopped the publication of two others and instructed newspapers not to mention the name of Saad or his exiled associates in their articles or news. These measures were unpopular and what made it worse for him was the arrest and imprisonment, on 25 July 1922, of seven members of the Wafd by the British military authority and their appearance in front a British military court under the accusation of printing and distributing leaflets inciting hate of the Government of His Majesty the King of Egypt. Their death sentence was commuted to seven years prison terms and large fines. They were released in May 1923. The seven-year sentences for inciting hate were not coherent with the three years sentences for the attempted murder on Sarwat a few months earlier.

=== Creation of the Liberal Constitutional Party ===
The Liberal Constitutional Party ("LCP"), was founded in October 1922, when Sarwat was still prime minister.The party included members of the Wafd, who had split from it in April 1921, as well as a majority of Saad's opponents. Adly, its founding president, announced in his speech to the party's first general assembly on 30 October 1922 that “Only the constitutional system is the proper way of governing a nation civilized like ours”. Some thought that Prime Minister Sarwat, should join the Party so that the Cabinet could be an LCP cabinet, but Sarwat was not a founder of the LCP and never jointed it. Nevertheless, the Sarwat government gave full backing and logistical support to its creation.

To better understand the roots of the LCP, we must remember that at the beginning of its formation, the Wafd movement was moderate in its approach and actions [see above, meeting of 13 November 1918 between Saad and Lord Wingate]. This was natural, given that most of its members were from the pre-war moderate Umma Party. Disagreements came gradually among the Wafd members, and culminated in five of its seven founding members quitting it on 26 April 1921 [see above]. Certain authors think that the division within the Wafd was not due to essential disagreements about objectives or methods (moderate or populist), but rather to the absence of trust between its members and the authoritarian personality of its leader, Saad. At its origin, the Wafd was a moderate movement, even members who split from it were moderates and remained so in their political actions after they left it. It is only natural to find that the Liberal Constitutional Party they formed in October 1922 was a moderate party working within the framework set by the Declaration of Independence, which they helped bring about and which the Wafd opposed. Given the popularity of the Wafd, it is no surprise to find that the LCP did not enjoy popular support.

The approaching elections, which were to follow the promulgation of the Constitution certainly can explain why the Liberal Constitutional Party was founded in October 1922. Nevertheless, the precise timing was mainly driven by its founders anticipating the King's removal of Sarwat, one of their supporters. They wanted to make a move before a party loyal to the King was created, which was rumored at the time.

=== Rapprochement between the Wafd and the Palace ===
As relations between the King and Sarwat deteriorated because of their diverging views on the constitution, a rapprochement between the Palace and the Wafd against the Sarwat Cabinet was taking shape. The rapprochement was driven by Mohamed Tawfik Nessim Pasha, the Head of the Royal Office, who was supported by previous ministers and friends unhappy about the Rushdi, Adly, Sarwat trio taking over the political stage. The Wafd, on the other hand, hoped that a Cabinet led by Nessim and supported by the King would free Saad from exile. In an interview from his exile to Reuters, Saad asserted his loyalty to the King and vowed to serve Nation and King. This became the moto of the Wafd. Subsequently, the King met the interim President of the Wafd who then and issued an unusually aggressive communiqué against the Sarwat Cabinet.

=== Resignation of the Sarwat cabinet ===
The King, who liked neither Sarwat nor a constitution limiting his powers, plotted to remove Sarwat. He used his recent rapprochement with the Wafd, the issue of the Sudan clauses and a security situation he orchestrated, that would have brought heavy criticism on the Government, to corner Sarwat into resigning.

The Wafd and the Palace, each for its own reasons, supported the inclusion of two Sudan clauses in the constitution. The inclusion of the clauses was opposed by the British and “Sarwat Pasha quite saw the reasonableness of the British contention that reference to the Sudan would be entirely out of place in the Egyptian Constitution-on the other hand, if he acquiesced he stood to be shot by the Palace, by the Zaghlulists [the Wafd], and very likely, as he surmised, by his own political friends”. In fact, it was the last part that tilted the balance. The king had adroitly exploited his own rapprochement with the Wafd which make him appear a nationalist. “Adly Pasha of course realized that references to the Sudan could not be justified, but he was fighting the Zaghlulists and could not afford to give them the right to call him a traitor to his country. [...]. In the end, he took action, which proved Sarwat right, and announced if the Prime minister met British wishes in the matter of the Sudan his party would no longer support him.”

The final act came from two schemes organized by the King. In the first, a rumor, known to the King as false, alleged that when Sarwat was in Europe, he contacted the ex-Khedive Abbas Helmi, an enemy of the King. This was taken as an opportunity by the King to tell Sarwat that he did not want him as prime minister anymore. In the second scheme, the king announced that he intended to do his Friday (30 November 1922) prayer at Al-Azhar Mosque, accompanied by his ministers. The Palace coordinated with the Wafd and the Azharites to organize a riot, where Government Ministers would be physically attacked after the King left the mosque, leaving the government in a bad optical situation. Sarwat having learned about this scheme the previous day, resigned on the afternoon of 29 November 1922. The King accepted his resignation within half an hour and appointed Nessim Pasha as prime minister.

== Egypt between the two Sarwat cabinets (1922–1927) ==
=== Battle for the Constitution ===
The Nessim Cabinet was formed without a program and applied himself to changing the draft constitution to suit the King's interest. These changes included the removal of an article stating that the people are the source of powers. Half of the Senate was now to be appointed by the King. The president of the Senate was to be appointed by the King, rather than jointly by King and Cabinet. In addition, it gave the King the power to dissolve the two chambers. Furthermore, and after Britain pressured the King, the Nessim Cabinet agreed to remove the two Sudan clauses. These changes to the original draft prepared by the Committee of the thirty, were kept secret during the Nessim Cabinet. The cabinet resigned on 5 February 1923, having lasted 68 days.

After a failed attempt to get Adly to form a new cabinet, one was formed more than a month later, on 15 March 1923, by Yehia Ibrahim Pasha, the Chief Judge and who had also been a member in the Nessim cabinet. It was an administrative cabinet without a program. As the Ibrahim Government started to look at the constitution, the previous changes prepared by Nessim started to leak. Many objections were then voiced, among which were objections from the Committee of the Thirty, which had worked on the original draft proposed by Sarwat to the King a few months earlier. The Liberal Constitutional Party, with its some if its founders being members of the Committee of the Thirty, became one of the few supporters of the return to the original version of the constitution drafted by that committee. As for the Wafd, it found itself in a difficult position, unwilling to accept the Nessim version, but unable politically to agree with the Committee of the Thirty, which it opposed at the time. (Ramdan 1, p.391). Prime Minister Ibrahim proposed the formation of a constituent assembly to redraft the constitution. This was not politically possible and the Constitution was promulgated on 19 April 1923 “according to the draft prepared by the Committee on the Constitution with the two clauses related to the Sudan deleted”. The Ibrahim Cabinet resigned on the same day, having governed for a month and half only. Eleven days later, on 30 April 1923, the Elections Law was enacted.

=== Saad Zaghlul cabinet ===
On 31 March 1923, almost there weeks before the constitution was enacted, the British Foreign Office announced the release of Saad from exile, for health reasons. He travelled to France, where he remained for more than six months. On 17 September 1923, Saad returned to Egypt after an absence of more than twenty months.

With the constitution and the Elections Law enacted, the electoral campaign started without Saad and lasted about nine months until election day, on 12 January 1924. The election was a sweep for the Wafd, which garnered 90% of the Chamber of Deputies’ seats. The King asked Saad, the head of the winning party, to form a Cabinet. Saad became, on 28 January 1924 the first Prime Minister of Egypt under its Constitution.

Soon after Saad became prime minister, in January 1924, he accepted the invitation of Ramsay MacDonald to negotiate with Britain. MacDonald had become Prime Minister of a minority Labor Government in Britain earlier on the same month Saad formed his Cabinet. These short negotiations (September–October 1924) broke down, weakening Saad's political position in Egypt. The King exploited this weakness and tried to dislodge Saad. The latter played a better hand and resigned on 15 November 1924. He then rescinded his resignation after reaching at an agreement with the King who was under heavy pressure from popular demonstrations supporting Saad.

On 19 November 1924, two days after Saad rescinded his resignation, an event occurred, which was to have important consequences for the political and constitutional life in Egypt. Major-General Sir Lee Stack, the British Commander-in-Chief of the Anglo-Egyptian army (the Sirdar) and Governor-General of the Sudan was assassinated in Cairo. This event resulted in the British government announcing a set of demands in two “warnings” to the Egyptian Government. These demands were expectedly unacceptable to Prime Minister Saad who resigned again on 23 November 1924.

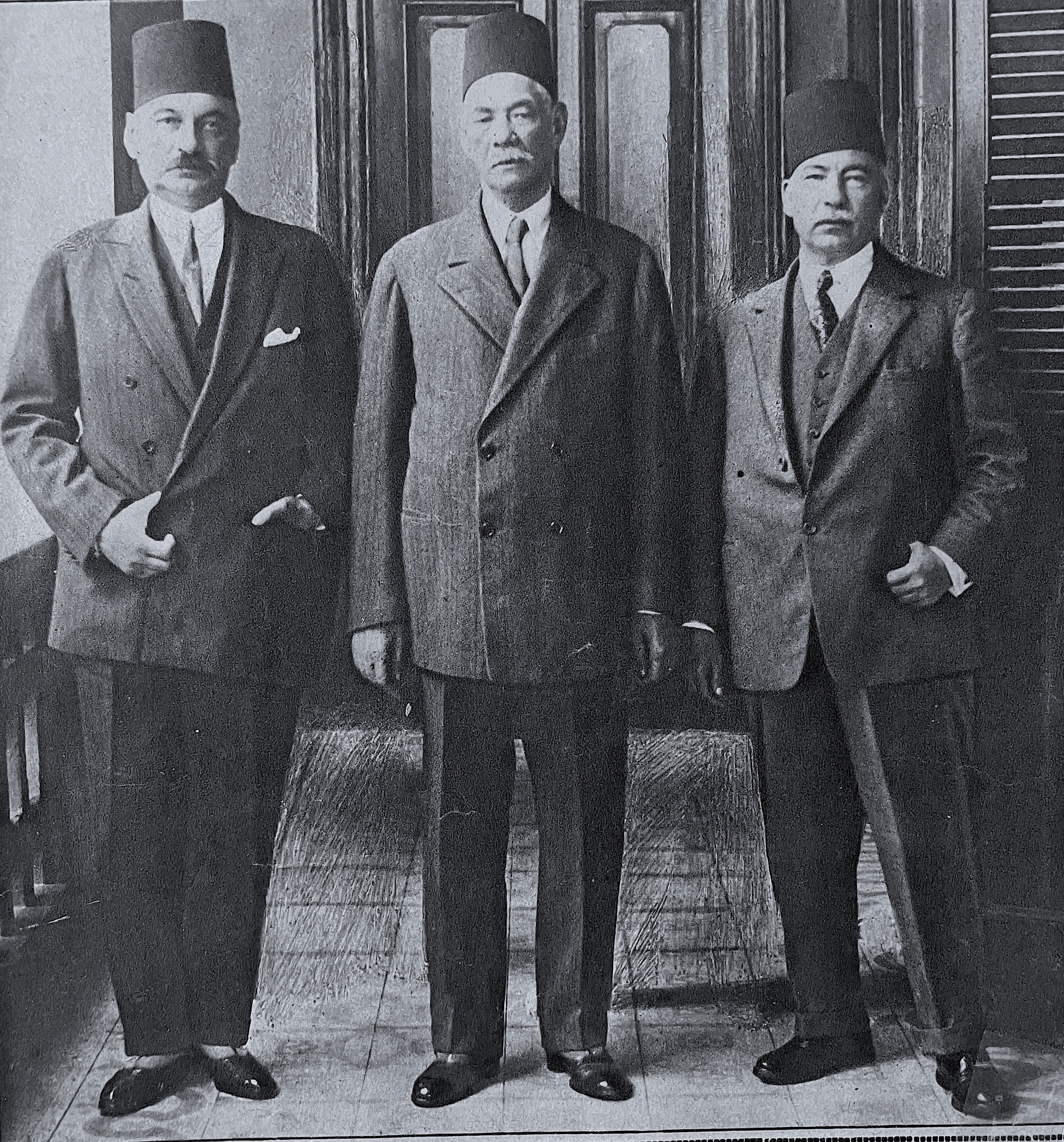
Adly, Saad and Sarwat the day before the National Congress meeting. 18 February 1926

=== Unconstitutional Rule ===
On the day Saad resigned, the King appointed Ahmed Zeiwar Pasha as prime minister. Zeiwar moved quickly. Within a week, he accepted the British demands made following the assassination of Sir Lee Stack. He also requested the King to suspend the Chamber of Deputies for 30 days. One day before the end of the suspension period and for no good reason, Zeiwar requested that the King dissolve it. The Chamber was dissolved on 24 December 1924, with 6 March 1925 set as the date for the new Chamber to convene.

The Wafd won the elections 116-87 but, despite these results, Zeiwar announced falsely on 13 March 1925 that non-Wafd parties had won the election. He proceeded with a mere reshuffle of the Cabinet. On 23 March 1925, during its inaugural session, the new Chamber of Deputies elected Saad as its president by 123 votes against 85 votes for Sarwat. On that evening, Prime Minister Zeiwar resigned. The King refused the resignation. Furthermore, on the recommendation of Zeiwar, he dissolved the Chamber and called for new elections. On 26 March, three days later, again on the recommendation of Zeiwar, the King cancelled the election. The excuse was that the current Election Law needed to be changed as it was not ensuring proper representation. The country was now governed unconstitutionally.

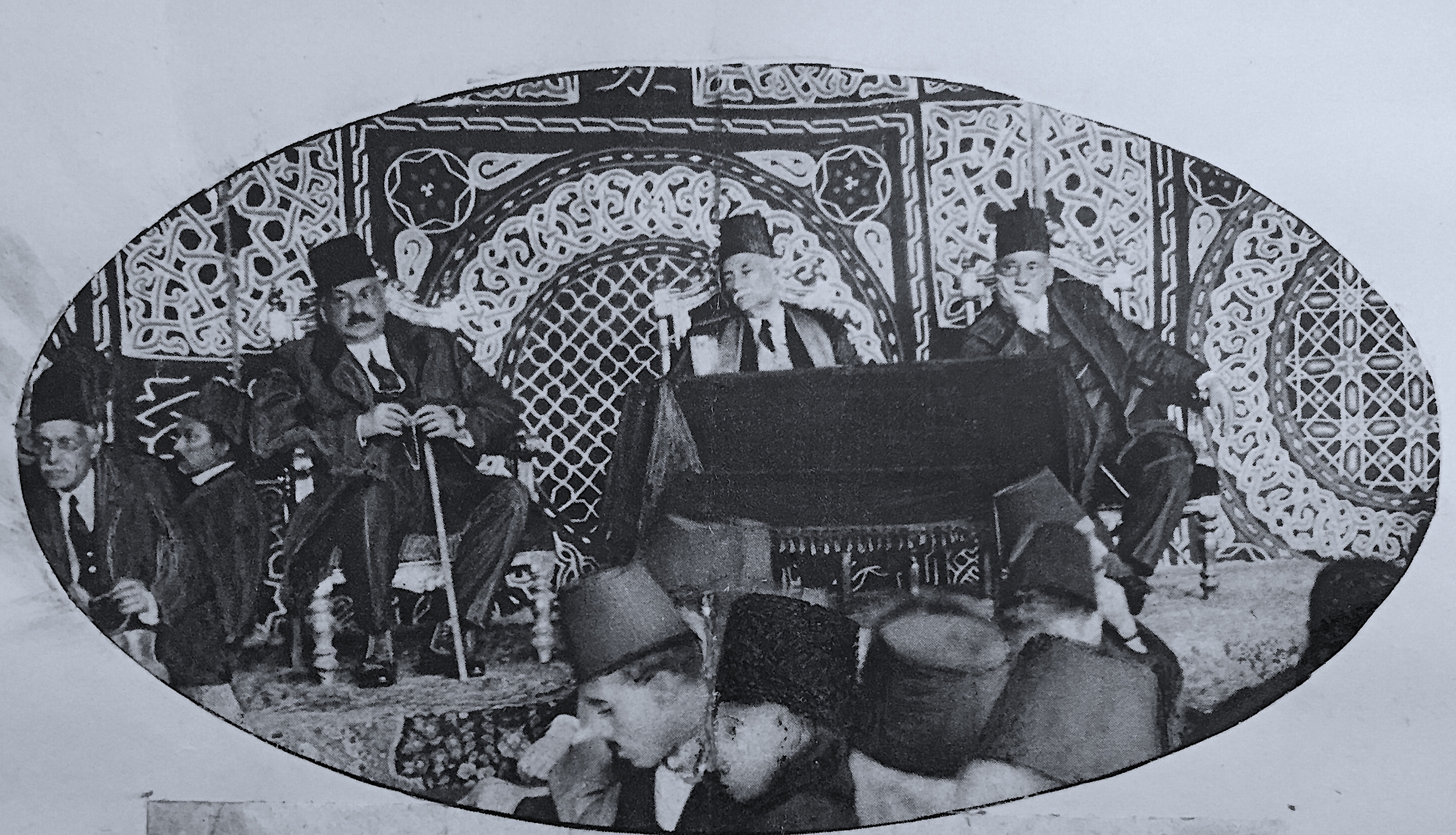
The podium of the National Congress (19 February 1926). Left to right: Adly, Saad and Sarwat.

The second half of 1925 saw the country moving from one political crisis to another. The Wafd, whose political power was based on being the most popular party, found its influence diminished, now that political life was paralyzed. As a result, some of its members sought a reconciliation with the Liberal Constitutional Party. An attempt by the deputies to meet in the chamber on 21 November 1925 was thwarted by the King. Instead, the meeting was moved to the Continental Hotel. This signaled the official start of a reconciliation among the parties. A coalition of parties was formalized in January 1926 by the creation of the executive committee for the Coalesced Parties.

From there on, events moved fast. The coalesced Parties announced the boycott of the elections and called for a National Congress to meet. A Congress of over 1,000 persons met on 19 February 1926. Saad led the Congress and sat at the podium with Adly and Sarwat on his sides (see picture). After a hot debate, the Congress called for, among other things, direct elections to be held according to the 1924 law. The Government, under pressure from the British, obtained from the King to call an election. This ended the constitutional crisis.

=== Return of Constitutional Rule ===
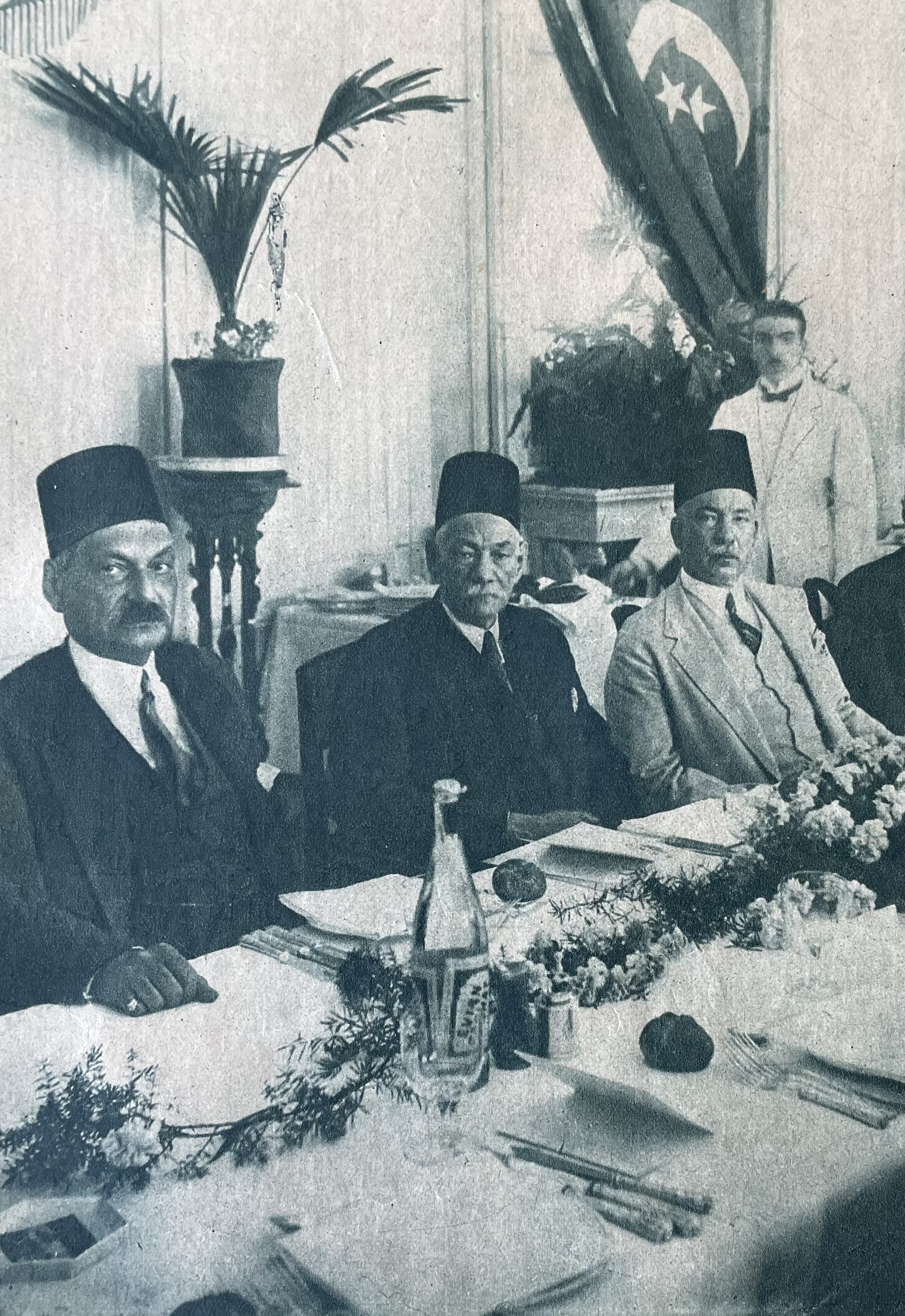
Banquet in honor of Saad (3 June 1926). Left to right: Adly, Saad and Sarwat.

The elections were called for 22 May 1926. The Coalesced Parties agreed publicly in advance to guarantee 160 seats to the Wafd Party and 45 to the Liberal Constitutional Party. The expected results of the elections forced the Cabinet to announce its pending resignation, opening the door for a Wafd Cabinet headed by Saad. The British who had a historical animosity against Saad tried by all means, including the threat of a military show of force, to prevent him from forming a cabinet. Saad, alleging health reasons, announced that he was not forming a cabinet. Instead, he agreed with Adly and Sarwat that Adly should head the Cabinet, which would include Wafdists and Liberal Constitutionalists. He announce it at a banquet given in his honor at the Continental Hotel (see right picture).

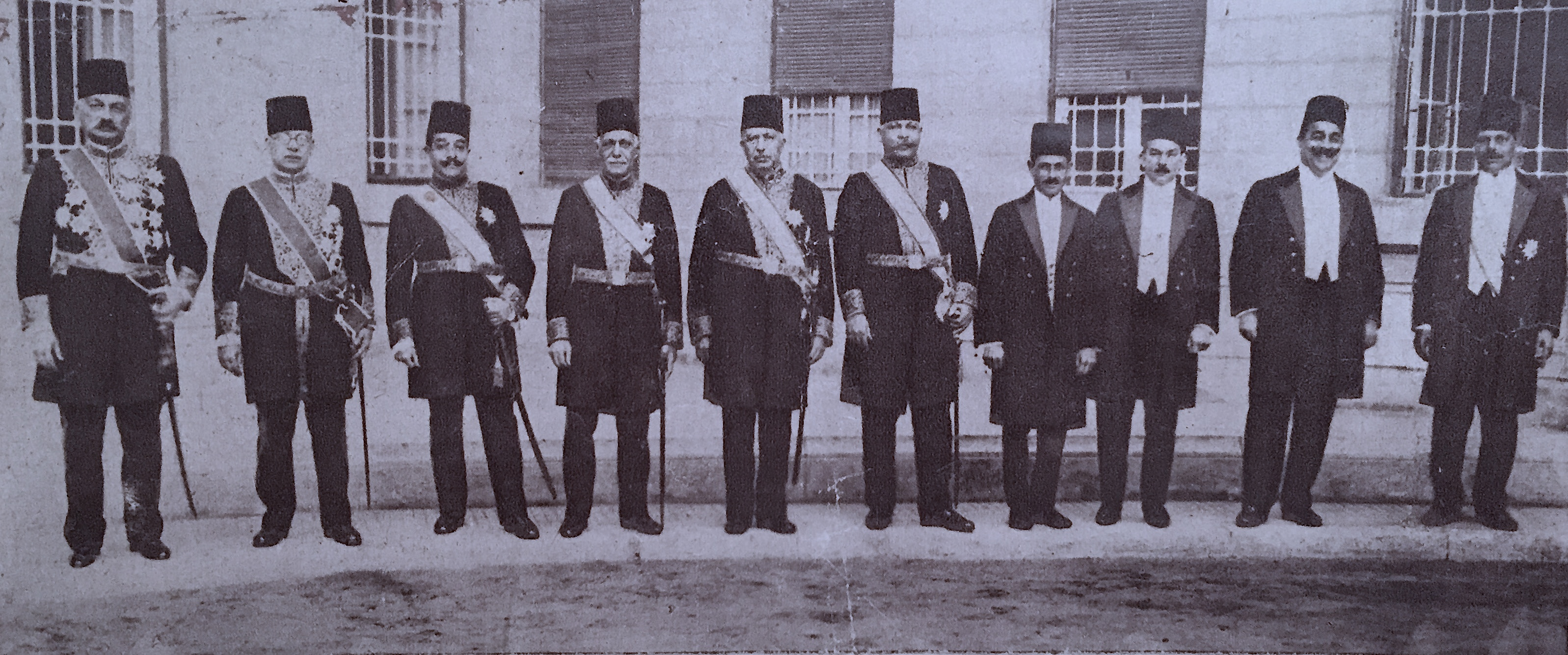
Adly Cabinet. Early April 1927. From the left: Adly, Sarwat.

On 7 June 1926, the King asked Adly to form a cabinet (see left picture). This Cabinet was the first of two so called Coalition Cabinets (somewhat of a misnomer, since Wafd had won the majority in the Chamber of Deputies. Saad was reluctant to call it a coalition Cabinet). Sarwat was appointed Minister of Foreign Affairs. Three day later Saad was elected President of the Chamber of Deputies The focus of this cabinet was to consolidate constitutional rule, address internal issues and avoid confrontation with the British. Its purpose was to clear the way to start new negotiations with the British, as Sarwat indicated to the Chamber of Deputies.

On 18 April 1927, using as excuse a debate on a trivial matter in Parliament, Prime Minister Adly abruptly announced the resignation of his cabinet. The real reason, though, was the mounting pressure from Wafd extremists pushing towards policies (specifically related to the Army) that were too extreme for him. Saad tried unsuccessfully to change Adly's mind. “So little were they [Saad Zaghlul and the moderate Wafdists] inclined for internecine strife that they put forward Sarwat Pasha as an acceptable Prime Minister, and even agreed to the conditions which he laid down as essential to him”.

== Second Sarwat cabinet (1927–1928) ==
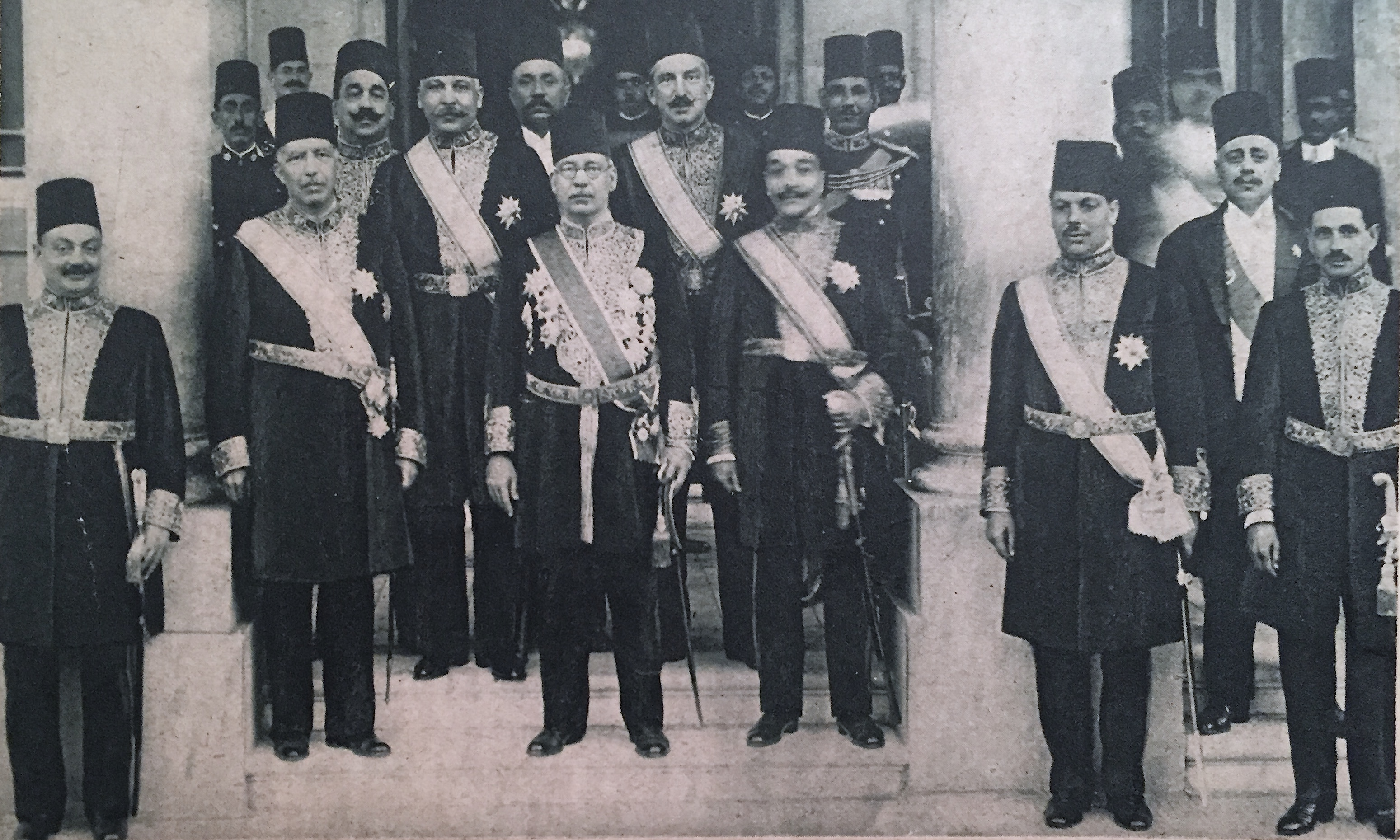
Sarwat and his Cabinet at Parliament House. c. April 1927

The King called on Sarwat to form a Cabinet on 26 April 1927. In it, Sarwat kept to himself the Ministry of the Interior. This Cabinet found itself dealing with two unexpected issues: the so-called Army Crisis, which descended on the Cabinet less than a month after it was formed and the Sarwat-Chamberlain negotiations on the relations between Egypt and Britain, which started unexpectedly.

=== The army crisis ===
A month after he became prime minister, Sarwat found himself dealing with an acute crisis between Egypt and Britain, the Army Crisis.

This crisis had its roots back to the 1924 assassination of the Sirdar and, more fundamentally, to the importance for Britain to keep the Egyptian Army under its control, ensuring Egypt as a safe passage to India. Focusing on the crisis, the 1927–28 budget was an opportunity for some Wafd deputies to propose, through a subcommittee of the Army Committee, measures to enhance the resources of the Army while reducing British oversight of it. According to the British, “... we were faced with the prospect of an Egyptian Army, much increased in strength, and not only removed from any possibility of control by us, but saturated as the result of intensive propaganda with the political influence of an extreme political party [meaning the wafd]”. It was generally true that the Army supported the Wafd. For the British, this move from some of the Wafd Deputies crossed a red line. The British High Commissioner, Lord Lloyd tried to convince Sarwat of Britain's point of view. In response, Sarwat sent him a note on 24 May 1926 indicating that, from a legal point of view, the position of the Government of Egypt was that Army matters do not fall under the reserved points of the Declaration of 28 February 1922 and that Egypt is free to make decisions about it.

The British answer was swift. On 31 May 1926, Lloyd “handed to Sarwat Pasha an official note embodying the views and demands of His Majesty's Government”. There were six demands. These would have resulted in thwarting the initiative proposed to the sub-committee of the Chamber of deputies. Waiting for Sarwat's reply, Lloyd, as he later explained, “... was compelled in view of the possibility of disturbance to request the despatch of a warship to Alexandria as a precautionary measure. That the arrival of this ship might be regarded as a threat was an inevitable conclusion, but I was not prepared to risk lives”. Sarwat's reply came on 3 June stating his understanding of British preoccupations. He agreed to only one of the six demands, while not explicitly rejecting the other five. Amid a disagreement between the British Foreign Office and the High Commissioner on how to respond to Sarwat, Lloyd tried further to pressure Sarwat and Saad. In response, on 11 June, Sarwat proposed a solution: Lloyd would ask him for further clarifications on his note, to which Sarwat would provide a reply that would be accepted by Lloyd. This ended the crisis.

=== Sarwat-Chamberlain negotiations ===
In July 1927, Sarwat found himself unexpectedly negotiating with the British. Following the resolution of the Army crisis, Sarwat was politically in a stronger position and the British Foreign office wanted to take this opportunity to negotiate a treaty with a moderate Egyptian Government, which would safeguard British interests.

The opportunity arose when Prime Minister Sarwat accompanied the King on his official visit to Britain in July 1927. The events unfolding upon and after Sarwat arrival in London reveal the different views held by the British Secretary of State and the British High Commissioner regarding the timing of initiating such negotiations. While the High Commissioner, Lord Lloyd believed that there should be a waiting period until such negotiations could begin and it up the Government of Egypt to make the request. Nevertheless, the Secretary of State, Sir Austen Chamberlain moved immediately to benefit from the stronger Sarwat cabinet and did so without coordination with Lloyd. “I had had also the definite assurance of the Secretary of State that if at any time negotiations should appear to be possible, they would be conducted in Egypt not in London” Also, the negotiations were not planned or prepared in advance. “In spite of the Secretary of State's clearly recorded intention not to negotiate with Sarwat Pasha “during this visit”, the historical fact is that negotiations were begun the very next day, and two days afterwards-July 15-a detailed treaty was actually in draft. On July 18 Sarwat Pasha called again at the Foreign Office and communicated a draft treaty which he on his side had drafted”.

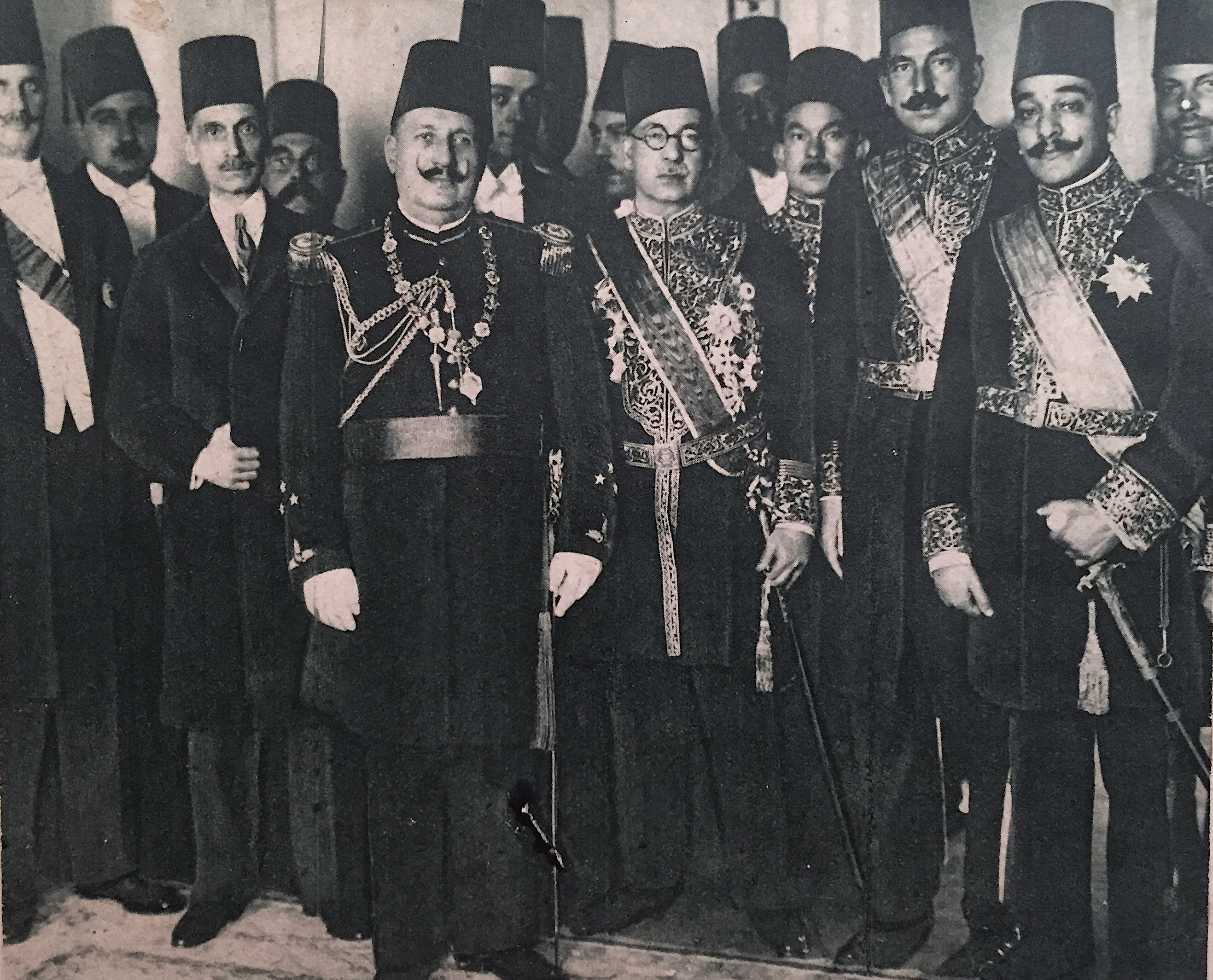
King Fuad I, Sarwat, Ministers and Princes. Autumn 1927.

The unplanned overture of the Secretary of State initiated a sequence of events. In his first meeting with Sarwat on 12 July, Chamberlain clarified British interests in Egypt and hoped that an agreement was possible that would safeguard both Britain and Egypt's interests. The lack of agreement, explained Chamberlain, would inevitably result in an eventual crisis that Britain would have to resolve by force. He then insisted that Sarwat, to the latter's surprise, present him a draft treaty to normalize the relations between the two countries. Sarwat presented his draft treaty on 18 July 1927, which included concessions to Egyptian National aspirations. Sarwat later justified his concessions: “I was, despite that, taking into consideration what went into the minds of the British in terms of suspicions and unease, which may have prevented the full realization of these [Egyptian national] demands...Hence I saw that I would not have served Egyptian interests if I only presented a narrative about the National demands”. This marked the beginning of long and arduous negotiations, during which an event with major consequences happened.

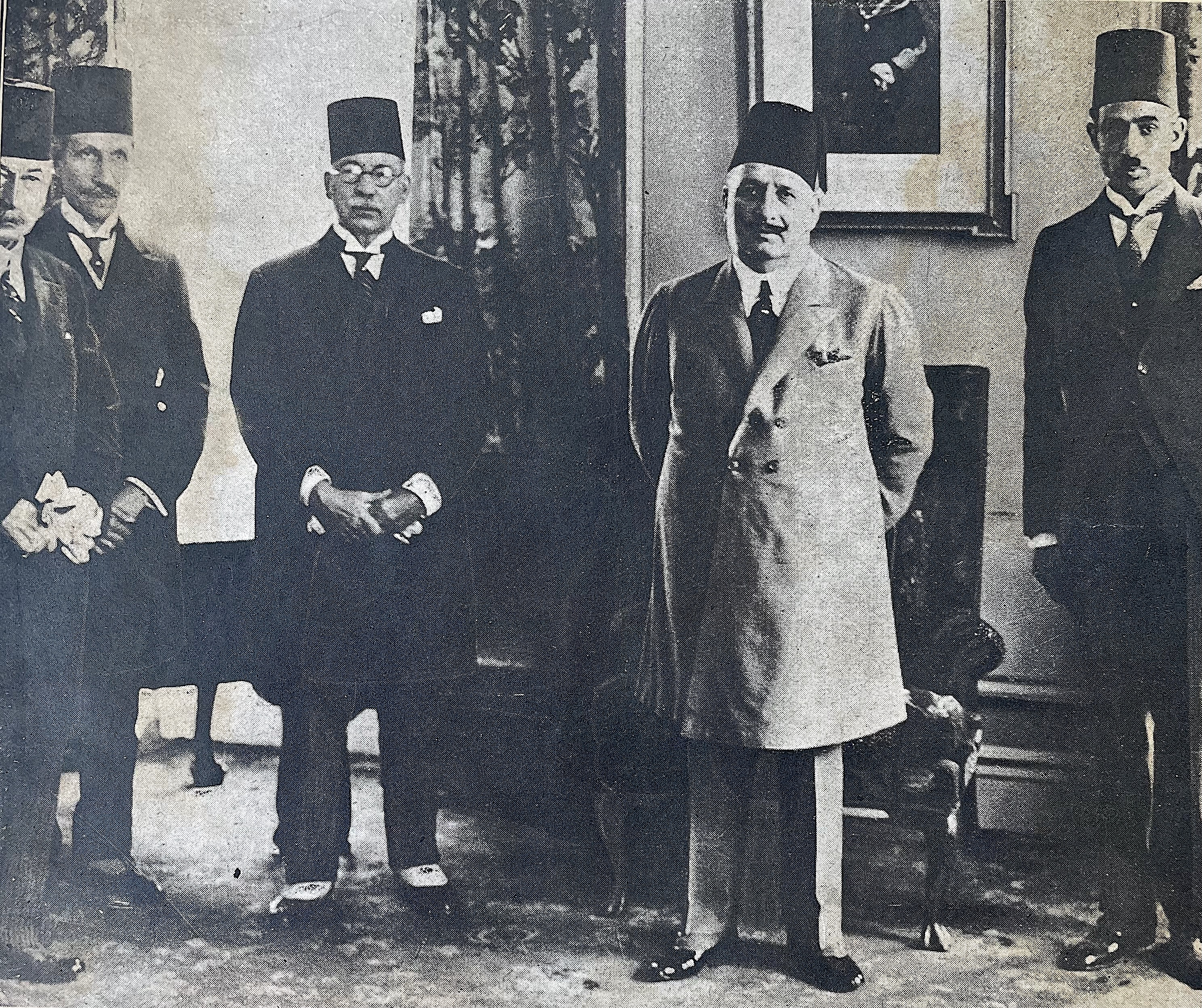
Sarwat and King Fuad I, at the Egyptian club in London. 11 July 1927.

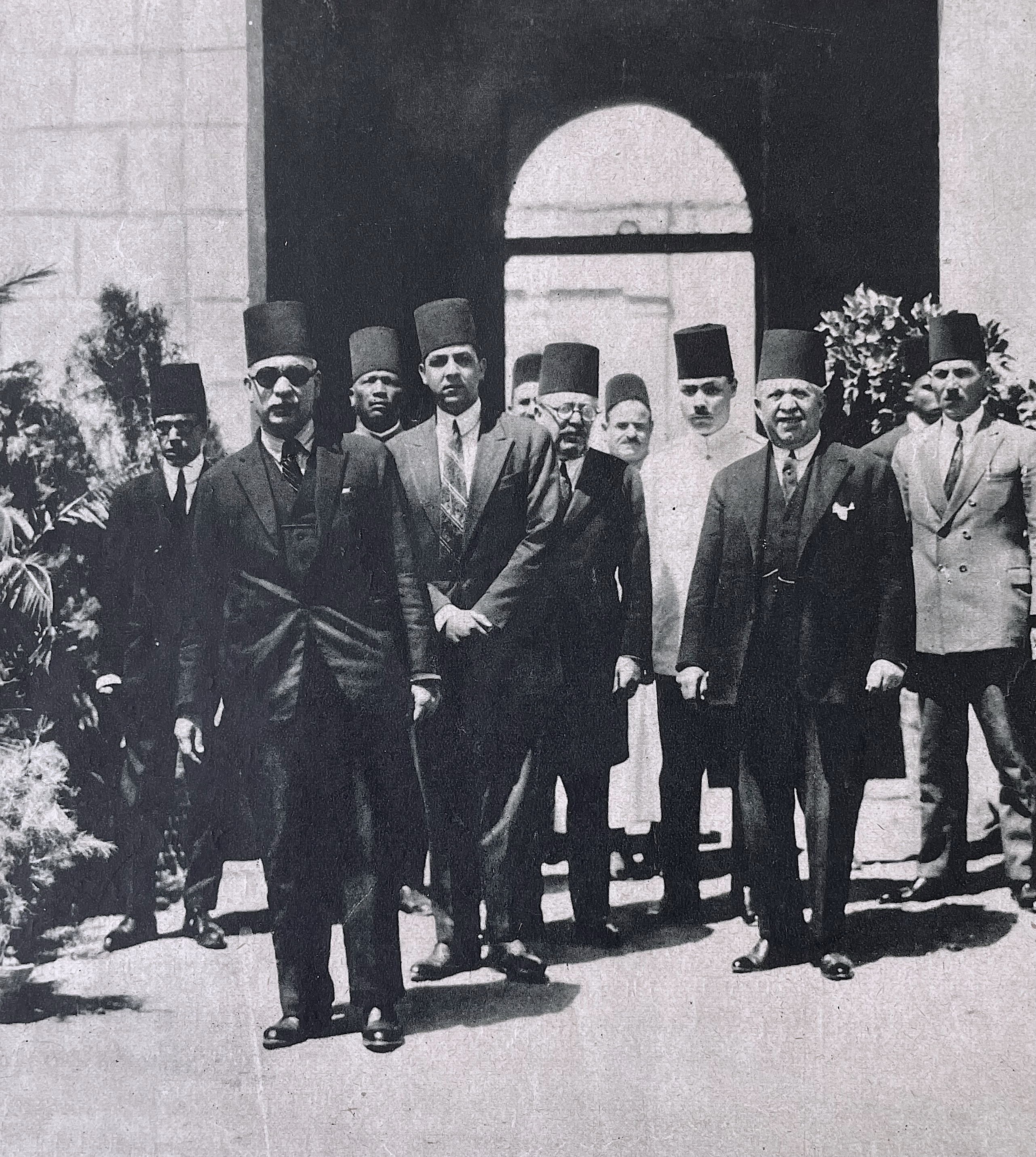
Sarwat (in dark glasses) visiting the Tomb of Saad Zaghlul, September 1927.

On 23 August 1927, Saad Zaghlul Pasha, national icon and Leader of the majority Wafd Party died in Egypt. During the negotiation and until his death, Saad had been in communication with Sarwat about the negotiation. It took three weeks for the party to elect Mostafa El-Nahas Pasha as new leader. The new leader was known for his extremism, guaranteeing that the Party would maintain its revolutionary approach. Lord Lloyd, the British High Commissioner, was of the view that the negotiations should be suspended as “Zaghlul had been the one person whose support of a treaty with England could have ensured its acceptance. With his death, the possibility of such acceptance was rendered indefinitely more remote”. He also saw that the Liberal Democratic Party, which supported Sarwat, had a better chance to secure the lead after Saad Zaghlul's death and that a suspension of the negotiations would help to that end. The foreign office, not listening to its people on the terrain, wanted to move forward “these considerations were used in London as an argument in favor of pressing forward the treaty negotiations, although it was realized that the prospect of securing the treaty was now remote”. On the Egyptian side, the death of Saad did not discourage Sarwat from his aim. On the contrary, he was the one who insisted on resuming the negotiations. and returned to London at the end of October 1927 to do so.

The negotiations were long and arduous. According to Sarwat “We were not moving forward without a lot of hardship and suffering”. On 6 February 1928, Secretary of State Chamberlain sent a threatening letter to Sarwat. Despite no agreement having yet been reached, he demanded that the draft treaty be presented as is to the Egyptian Government for signature. This was followed by a second similar letter on 24 February. Sarwat, being also pressured by his Ministers and by El-Nahas, the new leader of the Wafd, had no choice but to submit the incomplete draft treaty to Nahas. After studying it, Nahas and his party rejected the document.

On 4 March 1928, The Cabinet rejected the draft treaty. On the same day, Sarwat informed the Foreign office through the High Commissioner of the rejection and presented his resignation to the King.

== Sarwat's death (1928) ==
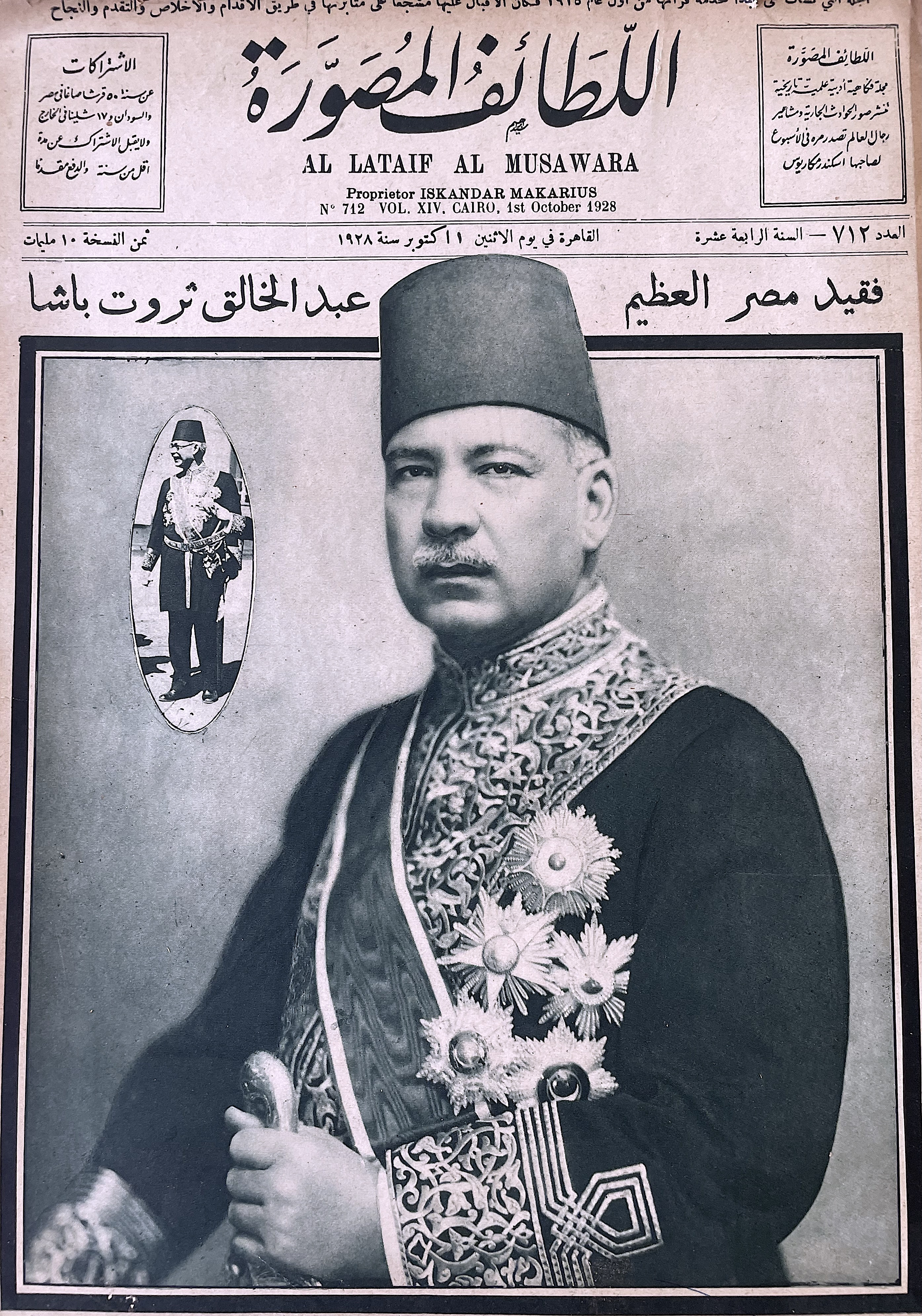
Obituary of Sarwat Pasha

Abdel Khalek Sarwat Pasha died from a heart attack, while on a personal visit to Paris on 22 November 1928 at the age of 55. His wife and his son Mustapha were with him. He was buried in Cairo after national funerals which started upon the arrival of his remains in Alexandria and onward by train to Cairo.

== Family life ==
Abdel Khalek Sarwat was married to Fatma Sadek, who died a year after him. They had six children, four boys: Ismail (1898–1969), Ahmed (1900–1990), Mustapha (1902–1960) and Aziz (1903–1983) and two girls: Enayat and Nehmat.

== Topical sections ==
=== Sarwat and the Liberal Constitutional Party ===
The Liberal Constitutional Party (LCP) had an intellectually liberal and secular platform, which was reflected in the promotion of a multiparty constitutional rule. On the Economy, it promoted economic liberalism and socially it believed in the respect of individual freedoms.

The first idea about forming such a party sprang in August 1921, when the Adly-Curzon negotiations were in trouble. In September, supporters of Adly approached Sarwat with their idea to form a party. The latter presented it to Adly, who initially rejected it, worrying that it would deepens the rift between his supporters and Saad's. Two days later, Adly changed his mind, believing that Egyptians were not ready for a revolution and that there was a need for a peaceful solution which required sustained efforts and resources. The Party was officially founded in October 1922, one month before the resignation of the first Sarwat cabinet. According to some calculations, when founded, 56% of its leadership was from large land owners while 30% was from the urban middle classes.

Although Sarwat gave to the Party the full logistic support of his Government, he never became a member. In fact, the relation between Sarwat and the LDP was ambivalent. On one hand, he shared with the Party founders their beliefs of liberalism, moderation and gradual achievement of Egypt's independence and their belief in a multiparty constitutional rule. Sarwat and the Party supported each other politically. On the other hand, he wanted to maintain a distance from the Party, especially after his Cabinet's resignation in 1922, when he remained, nevertheless, close to many of its members.

In the 1925 Parliament, when Sarwat ran against Saad for the Presidency of the Chamber of Deputies, he was not sitting as an LDP deputy, but as an Independent. He did not run for his seat, but the seat was waived to him by an elected LDP deputy, Moustapha Sabri.

=== Sarwat and Taha Hussein ===
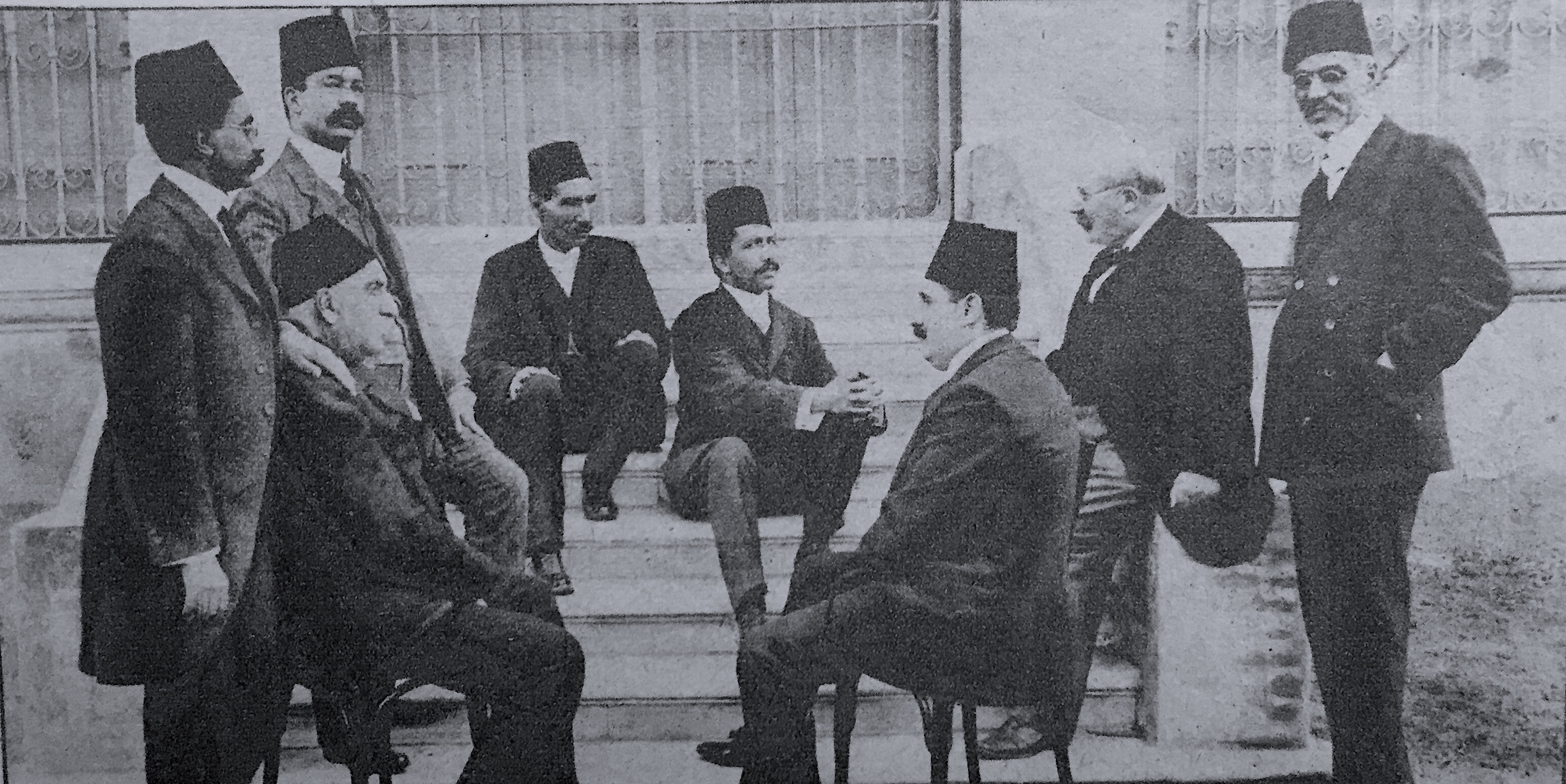
The First Board of Directors of the Egyptian University (1908). Sarwat is the second standing from the left. Sitting at the front right is the future King Fuad I.

Taha Hussein (1989-1973) was one of the most influential 20th-century Egyptian writer and intellectual and a figurehead of the Egyptian Renaissance. He was nicknamed “the Dean of Arabic Literature”. Sarwat was introduced to Taha Hussein by Ahmed Lufty El Sayed, the first president the Egyptian University. Sarwat was then Minister of Justice and Member of the Board of Directors of the Egyptian University. The introduction happened after a Board meeting, which discussed a complaint brought by a certain Sheikh Mohamed El Mahdi against Taha Hussein about an article the latter wrote and which was supported by some board members. A demand had been made to expel Hussein from the University's mission to France. In the end, he remained in the mission, thanks to the support of Lufty El Sayed and Sarwat This introduction was the beginning of a lifetime friendship between Sarwat and Taha Hussein. The basis of this friendship was a common belief by the two men in liberal thinking.

Much later, in December 1923, when the Egyptian University accepted to merge into the to be created University of Fouad I, Lutfi El Sayed, the then President of the Egyptian University, put as a condition to the merger, the appointment of Taha Hussein as Professor in the faculty of Arts of the new University. This is what ended up happening. On his first lecture as Professor of History of Arabic Literature, Taha Hussein was introduced by Sarwat.

In 1926, Taha Hussein highly controversial book “On Pre-Islamic Poetry” في الشعر الجاهلي was published. It was dedicated to Sarwat, who was on the Board of Director of the University of Fuad I at the time. The dedication, dated 22 March 1926, reflected the friendship of the two men, but possibly also a political calculation by Taha Hussein who may have anticipated events to come.

There were two highly controversial assertions in the book. First, that the Quran cannot be used as a source of historical facts: “The Torah may tell us about Abraham and Ismael and the Quran also can tell us about both, but the occurrence of these two names in the Torah and the Quran is not sufficient to prove their historical existence”. Second, that there were doubts about pre-Islamic poetry as a proper representation of pre-Islamic mental and spiritual state and even pre-Islamic Arabic language. The publication of the book led to public demonstrations and attacks by members of the house of representative, demands that Taha be fired from the University and official complaints to a District Attorney. By the time Sarwat became Minister of Foreign Affairs in the Adly coalition Government, the controversy was heated and Sarwat advised Taha Hussein to go away until matters settled a bit. Following several complaints, a District Attorney opened an investigation, which was delayed because of the absence of Taha Hussein. The investigation effectively started on 17 October 1926 and ended at on 30 March 1927 without any charges being filed. Less than two month later, Sarwat became prime minister while the controversy was still raging.

Taha Hussein who was a friend of Sarwat, was sympathetic to the Liberal Democratic Party, mainly because it espoused liberal ideas. As a result, the controversy became a confrontation between the religious establishment and supporters of the Wafd Party on one hand and supporters of the Liberal Constitutional Party on the other, with Sarwat being a historical supporter of the later.

== Activities and commendations ==
Sarwat was a member of the Board of Directors of the Egyptian University and of the Board of Directors of its successor University, the University of Fouad I. He was the third President of Al Ahly Sporting Club (1916–1924).

Abdel Khalek Sarwat street, a major street in downtown Cairo is named after him. In Alexandria, a tramway station bears his name as well as a street, on which he had his summer home, both in the neighborhood named after him. In Giza, the street bordering Cairo University on the north, now called Ahmed Zuwail Street, was called Sarwat street. A long overpass, recently built at the western end of that street is named Sarwat Bridge.

Political offices
| Preceded by Adly Yakan Pasha | Prime Minister of Egypt; 1922 | Succeeded by Mohamed Tawfik Naseem Pasha |
| Preceded by Adly Yakan Pasha | Prime Minister of Egypt; 1927–1928 | Succeeded by Mostafa en-Nahhas Pasha |
