= Mohamed Tawfik Naseem Pasha =

Prime Minister of Egypt (1920–1921, 1922–1923, 1934–1936)

The Honourable Mohamed Tawfik Naseem Pasha GCMG
- محمد توفيق نسيم باشا
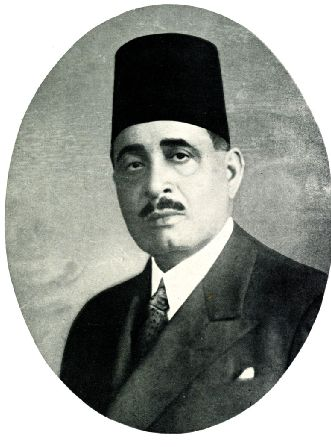
- Naseem in 1920

13th Prime Minister of Egypt
- In office 20 May 1920 – 16 March 1921
- Monarch: Fuad I
- Preceded by: Youssef Wahba
- Succeeded by: Adly Yakan Pasha
- In office 30 November 1922 – 15 March 1923
- Monarch: Fuad I
- Preceded by: Abdel Khalek Sarwat Pasha
- Succeeded by: Yahya Ibrahim Pasha
- In office 15 November 1934 – 30 January 1936
- Monarch: Fuad I
- Preceded by: Abdel Fattah Yahya Pasha
- Succeeded by: Ali Mahir Pasha

Personal details
- Born: June 30, 1871 Cairo, Eyalet of Egypt
- Died: 8 March 1938 (aged 66) Cairo, Kingdom of Egypt
- Party: Ittihad Party

Mohamed Tawfik Naseem Pasha GCMG (Arabic: محمد توفيق نسيم باشا; June 30, 1871 – March 8, 1938) was an Egyptian political figure of Turkish origin. He served as the prime minister of Egypt between May 1920 and 1921, again from 1922 until 1923, and finally between 1934 and 1936. He was also Minister of the Interior under Yusuf Wahba Pasha from November 1919 to May 1920. He was Minister of Finance in 1924.

He went to lawschool where he met other notable Egyptians such as the intellectual and activist Ahmed Lutfi el-Sayed, Isma'il Sedky, and the journalist Mustafa Kamil.

He was appointed Honorary Knight Grand Cross of the Order of St Michael and St George (GCMG) by King George V of the United Kingdom in December 1920. He married on 9 August 1901 the Egyptian Princess Munira (28 October 1884 - 18 November 1944) a granddaughter of Isma'il Pasha (paternal side) and a great-granddaughter of Abbas I of Egypt (maternal side), but divorced on 12 March 1924.

== Footnotes ==
Political offices
Preceded by Yousseff Wahba Pasha	Prime Minister of Egypt; 1920–1921	Succeeded by Adly Yakan Pasha
Preceded by Abdel Khalek Sarwat Pasha	Prime Minister of Egypt; 1922–1923	Succeeded by Abdel Fattah Yahya Ibrahim Pasha
Preceded by Abdel Fattah Yahya Ibrahim Pasha	Prime Minister of Egypt; 1934–1936	Succeeded by Aly Maher Pasha
