= Abdel Fattah Yahya Pasha =

Prime Minister of Egypt (1933–1934)

- يحيى إبراهيم باشا
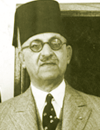

22nd Prime Minister of Egypt
- In office 22 September 1933 – 15 November 1934
- Monarch: Fuad I
- Preceded by: Isma'il Sidqi Pasha
- Succeeded by: Muhammad Tawfiq Nasim Pasha

Personal details
- Born: 1876
- Died: 1951 (aged 74–75)
- Political party: Ittihad Party

Abdel Fattah Yahya Pasha (Arabic: يحيى إبراهيم باشا; 1876–1951) was an Egyptian political figure. He served as Prime Minister of Egypt from 1933 to 1934.

He was Justice Minister in 1921 and 1930, and from 1930 to 1934 was Minister for Foreign Affairs. Though King Fuad I asked him to serve as Prime Minister from 1933 to 1934, he did not prove successful at leading the government in the face of popular opposition to the king. Elected a Senator in 1936, he proved more successful at chairing the Senate. He served on the delegation negotiating the 1936 Anglo-Egyptian Treaty, and was among Egypt's representatives at the 1945 United Nations Conference on International Organization.

Political offices
Preceded by Ismail Sedki Pasha	Prime Minister of Egypt; 1933-1934	Succeeded by Muhammad Tawfiq Nasim Pasha
