= Adly Yakan Pasha =

Prime Minister of Egypt (1921–1922, 1926–1927, 1929–1930)

Adly Yeghen Pasha
- عدلي يكن باشا
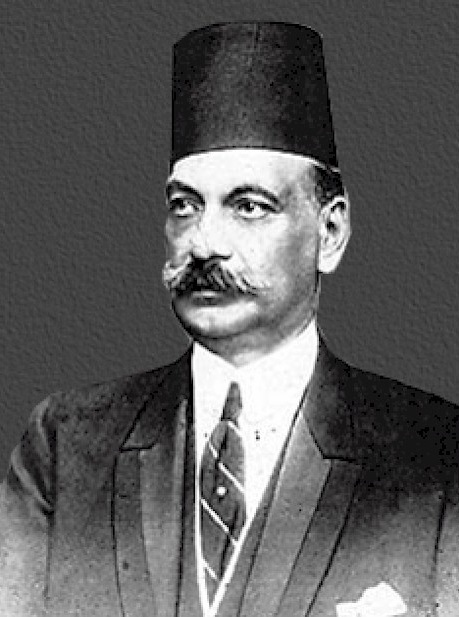

14th Prime Minister of Egypt
- In office 4 October 1929 – 1 January 1930
- Monarch: Fuad I
- Preceded by: Mohamed Mahmoud Pasha
- Succeeded by: Mostafa El-Nahas
- In office 7 June 1926 – 26 April 1927
- Monarch: Fuad I
- Preceded by: Ahmad Ziwar Pasha
- Succeeded by: Abdel Khalek Sarwat Pasha
- In office 16 March 1921 – 1 March 1922
- Monarch: Fuad I
- Preceded by: Mohamed Tawfik Naseem Pasha
- Succeeded by: Abdel Khalek Sarwat Pasha

Personal details
- Born: 18 January 1864; Cairo, Eyalet of Egypt
- Died: 22 October 1933 (aged 69); Paris, France
- Political party: Liberal Constitutional Party
- Occupation: Politician

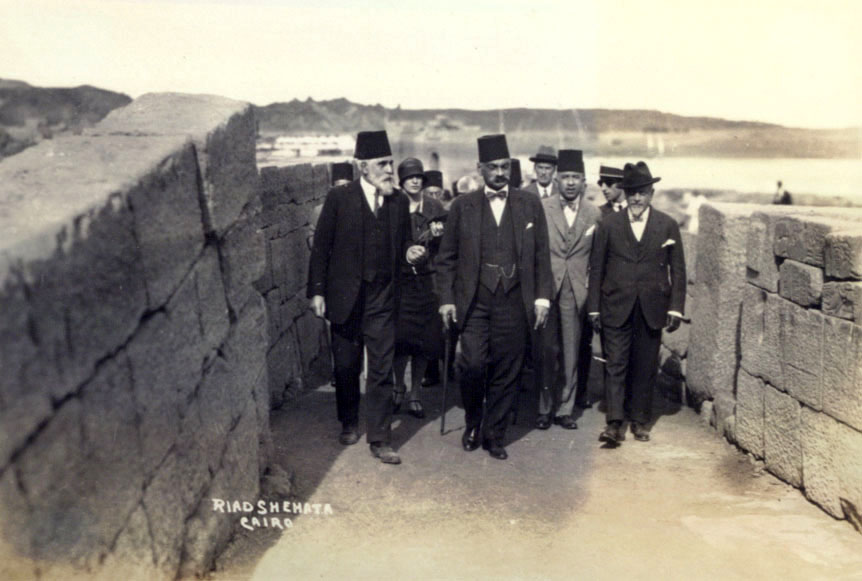
Adly Yeghen at the opening of the Luxor-Aswan rail line

Adly Yeghen Pasha (Arabic: عدلي يكن باشا; 18 January 1864 – 22 October 1933), was from the Yeghen/Yakan Family and a member of the Muhammed Ali Dynasty. He was sometimes referred to as Adly Pasha, was an Egyptian political figure. He served as the 14th prime minister of Egypt between 1921 and 1922, again between 1926 and 1927, and finally in 1929. He held several prominent political posts including foreign minister, interior minister and Speaker of the Egyptian Senate.

== Personal life ==
Yakan was of Turkish origin.

He was made an honorary KCMG in the 1918 New Year Honours.

He died in Paris, France. He was the great-grandnephew of Muhammad Ali Pasha.

Political offices
| Preceded by Mohamed Tawfik Naseem Pasha | Prime Minister of Egypt; 1921–1922 | Succeeded by Abdel Khalek Sarwat Pasha |
| Preceded by Ahmed Zeiwar Pasha | Prime Minister of Egypt; 1926–1927 | Succeeded by Abdel Khalek Sarwat Pasha |
| Preceded by Mohamed Mahmoud Pasha | Prime Minister of Egypt; 1929–1930 | Succeeded by Mostafa en-Nahas Pasha |
