= Yahya Ibrahim Pasha =

Prime Minister of Egypt (1923–1924)

Yahya Ibrahim
- يحيى إبراهيم
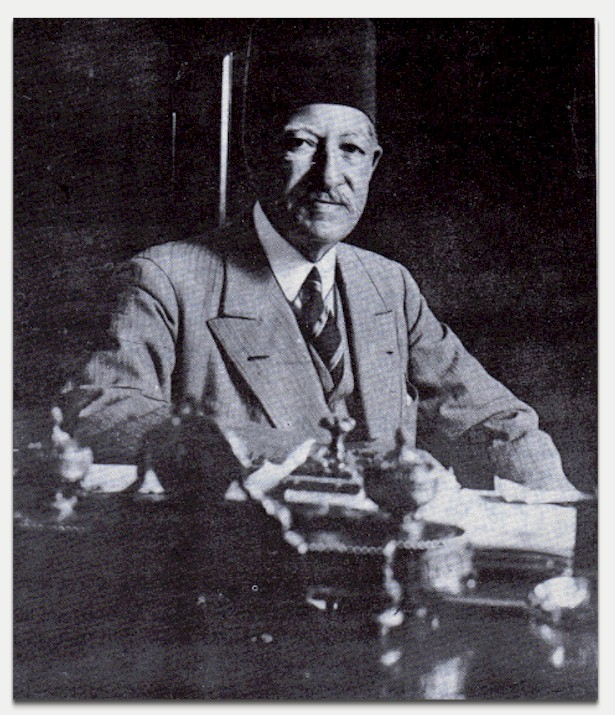

16th Prime Minister of Egypt
- In office 15 March 1923 – 26 January 1924
- Monarch: Fuad I
- Preceded by: Muhammad Tawfiq Nasim Pasha
- Succeeded by: Saad Zaghlul Pasha

Personal details
- Born: 1861; Bahbasheen, Beni Suef
- Died: 22 March 1936 (aged 74)
- Political party: Ittihad Party

Yahya Ibrahim (Arabic: يحيى إبراهيم) (1861–1936) was an Egyptian politician. He served as the 16th prime minister of Egypt from March 15, 1923, to January 27, 1924.

== Life ==
Yehia Ibrahim was born in Bahbasheen, Beni Suef. He studied at the Greater Coptic School of Cairo and graduated from the School of Law in 1880 and became an assistant professor at the Alsson School, a position he held from 1880 to 1881. He was then appointed assistant professor in the Faculty of Management within the School of Law and taught in that post from 1881 to 1882. He also taught law and translation and became dean of the Faculty of Management, a post he held from 1884 to 1888. He was promoted from the highest authority to the Civil Court of Alexandria, where he served as an assistant judge from 1888 to 1889. He was later upgraded to full judge in 1889 and moved to Mansoura, where he served as the president of the Court of Beni Suef from 1889 – 1891. He then moved to the Civil Court of Appeals in 1893. He worked as a chancellor to the Criminal Court of Tanta in 1905 and was promoted to president of the Native Court of Appeal and remained in that post until 1919.

== Political history ==
During Youssef Wahba’s first term as prime minister, Ibrahim was appointed minister of education and served from November 20, 1919, to May 21, 1920. He held the post of minister of education again during Tawfik Nasseem’s second term from November 30, 1922, to February 9, 1923. As minister, he focused on eradicating the illiteracy of workers in several districts throughout the country.

He was appointed prime minister on March 15, 1923, and served until January 27, 1924, where he continued to work as the minister of education. In addition to this, he became the minister of justice on November 18th, 1923. During his tenure as prime minister, he was known for his judiciousness and was given the nickname Sheikh Al Qadaa, or Chief of Judges. His time as prime minister was known as the “Ministry of Law” because of his "simple and straight forward programme of putting the Constitution in force" says Sir William Hayter in his book Recent Constitutional Developments In Egypt.

The most important accomplishments of his reign include: the issuance of Egypt’s first constitution on April 19, 1923; the release of Saad Zaghlol from his exile in Gibraltar after only serving as prime minister for two weeks, along with the release of Egyptian detainees and members of the Wafd Party; and the cancellation of several peripheral laws. Another important accomplishment was passing Egypt’s first elections law and the introduction of transparency within the elections process. His cabinet also managed to restore stability in the country after facing several upheavals following the 1919 revolution. During his tenure as prime minister, and with the return of Saad Zaghloul Pasha from exile, the Zagloulists won elections against Ibrahim, obtaining almost all seats of the parliament. On January 17, 1924, Ibrahim submitted his resignation from his post as prime minister, stating that he would have liked to stay long enough to also supervise the Senate election, but the people of Egypt have spoken and their will should be respected. This loss reinforced the idea that the elections under his reign were fair and free. After ten days of hesitation, King Fouad accepted the Cabinet resignation, Egypt Chronicles.com. When Hassan Nachat Pasha established the Ittihad Party or the “Union Party” in January 1925 to support the palace and the royal ministry at that time, he was unable to convince Mohamed Tawfik Naseem Pasha, Ahmed Zulfikar Pasha or the then Prime Minister Ahmed Ziwar Pasha to accept the post of president, so Yahya Ibrahim became its first president. He was also appointed as the head of the Senate of Egypt in 1925 and minister of finance 1925-1926. Despite his allegiance to the palace, he played an integral role in the opposition that was formed to denounce King Fouad’s annulment of the constitution 23 until it was reinstated in 1935.

Political offices
Preceded by Mohamed Tawfik Naseem Pasha	Prime Minister of Egypt; 1923-1924	Succeeded by Saad Zaghlul Pasha
