= Ahmed Zeiwar Pasha =

Prime Minister of Egypt (1924–1926)

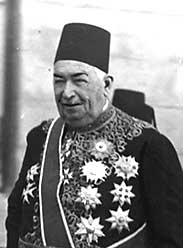
Ahmed Ziwar Pasha c. 1920

Ahmed Ziwar Pasha (1864–1945) (Arabic: أحمد زيور باشا) was the prime minister of Egypt from 24 November 1924 to 7 June 1926.

Preceded by Saad Zaghlul	Prime Minister of Egypt; 1924–1926	Succeeded by Adly Yakan Pasha
