= Liberalism in Egypt =

Liberalism in Egypt or Egyptian liberalism is a political ideology that traces its beginnings to the 19th century.

== History ==
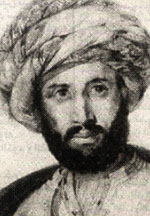
Rifa'a al-Tahtawy, 1801–1873

Rifa'a al-Tahtawi (also spelt Tahtawy; 1801–1873) was an Egyptian writer, teacher, translator, Egyptologist and renaissance intellectual. In 1831, Tahtawi was part of the statewide effort to modernize the Egyptian infrastructure and education. He undertook a career in writing and translation, and founded the School of Languages (also knowns as School of Translators) in 1835, which become part of Ain Shams University in 1973. The School of Languages graduated the earliest modern Egyptian intellectual milieu, which formed the basis of the emerging grassroots mobilization against British colonialism in Egypt. Three of his published volumes were works of political and moral philosophy. They introduced his Egyptian audience to Enlightenment ideas such as secular authority and political rights and liberty; his ideas regarding how a modern civilized society ought to be and what constituted by extension a civilized or "good Egyptian"; and his ideas on public interest and public good. Tahtawi's work was the first effort in what became an Egyptian renaissance (nahda) that flourished in the years between 1860 and 1940.

Tahtawi is considered one of the early adapters to Islamic Modernism. Islamic Modernists attempted to integrate Islamic principles with European social theories. In 1826, Al-Tahtawi was sent to Paris by Mehmet Ali. Tahtawi studied at an educational mission for five years, returning in 1831. Tahtawi was appointed director of the School of Languages. At the school, he worked translating European books into Arabic. Tahtawi was instrumental in translating military manuals, geography, and European history. In total, al-Tahtawi supervised the translation of over 2,000 foreign works into Arabic. Al-Tahtawi even made favorable comments about French society in some of his books. Tahtawi stressed that the Principles of Islam are compatible with those of European Modernity.

In his piece, The Extraction of Gold or an Overview of Paris, Tahtawi discusses the patriotic responsibility of citizenship. Tahtawi uses Roman civilization as an example for what could become of Islamic civilizations. At one point all Romans are united under one Caesar but split into East and West. After splitting, the two nations see “all its wars ended in defeat, and it retreated from a perfect existence to nonexistence.” Tahtawi understands that if Egypt is unable to remain united, it could fall prey to outside invaders. Tahtawi stresses the importance of citizens defending the patriotic duty of their country. One way to protect one's country according to Tahtawi, is to accept the changes that come with a modern society.

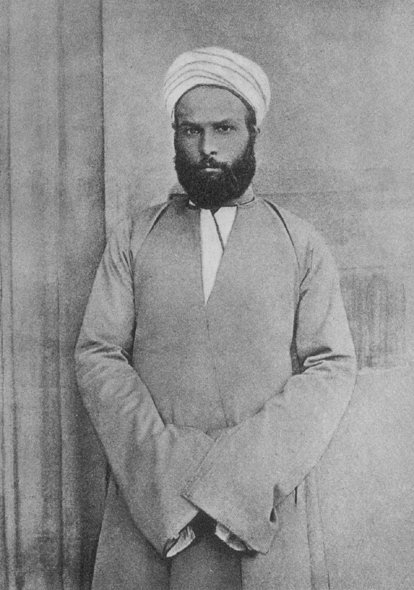
Muhammad Abduh

Muhammad Abduh (1849 – 11 July 1905) was an Egyptian Islamic jurist, religious scholar and liberal reformer, regarded as one of the key founding figures of Islamic Modernism, sometimes called Neo-Mu’tazilism. He broke the rigidity of the Muslim ritual, dogma, and family ties. He also wrote, among other things, "Treatise on the Oneness of God", and a commentary on the Qur'an. Muhammad Abduh argued that Muslims could not simply rely on the interpretations of texts provided by medieval clerics, they needed to use reason to keep up with changing times. He said that in Islam man was not created to be led by a bridle, man was given intelligence so that he could be guided by knowledge. According to Abduh, a teacher's role was to direct men towards study. He believed that Islam encouraged men to detach from the world of their ancestors and that Islam reproved the slavish imitation of tradition. He said that the two greatest possessions relating to religion that man was graced with were independence of will and independence of thought and opinion. It was with the help of these tools that he could attain happiness. He believed that the growth of western civilization in Europe was based on these two principles. He thought that Europeans were roused to act after a large number of them were able to exercise their choice and to seek out facts with their minds. In his works, he portrays God as educating humanity from its childhood through its youth and then on to adulthood. According to him, Islam is the only religion whose dogmas can be proven by reasoning. He was against polygamy and thought that it was an archaic custom. He believed in a form of Islam that would liberate men from enslavement, provide equal rights for all human beings, abolish the religious scholar's monopoly on exegesis and abolish racial discrimination and religious compulsion.

Muhammad Abduh claimed in his book "Al-Idtihad fi Al-Nasraniyya wa Al-Islam" that no one had exclusive religious authority in the Islamic world. He argued that the Caliph did not represent religious authority, because he was not infallible nor was the Caliph the person whom the revelation was given to; therefore, according to Abduh, the Caliph and other Muslims are equal. ʿAbduh argued that the Caliph should have the respect of the ummah but not rule it; the unity of the umma is a moral unity which does not prevent its division into national states.

Mohammad Abduh made great efforts to preach harmony between Sunnis and Shias. Broadly speaking, he preached brotherhood between all schools of thought in Islam. Abduh regularly called for better friendship between religious communities. As Christianity was the second biggest religion in Egypt, he devoted special efforts towards friendship between Muslims and Christians. He had many Christian friends and many a time he stood up to defend Copts.

=== British rule ===
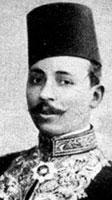
Mustafa Kamil, a Nationalist Leader Famous for coining the phrase, "If I had not been an Egyptian, I would have wished to become one", 1874–1908

Egyptian self-government, education, and the conditions of Egypt's peasant majority began to deteriorate under British occupation. Slowly, an organized national movement for independence began to form. In its beginnings, it took the form of an Azhar-led religious reform movement that was more concerned with the social conditions of Egyptian society. It gathered momentum between 1882 and 1906, ultimately leading to a resentment against European occupation. Sheikh Muhammad Abduh, the son of a Delta farmer who was briefly exiled for his participation in the Urabi revolt and a future Azhar Mufti, was its most notable advocate. Abduh called for a reform of Egyptian Muslim society and formulated the modernist interpretations of Islam that took hold among younger generations of Egyptians. Among these were Mustafa Kamil and Ahmed Lutfi el-Sayed, the architects of modern Egyptian nationalism. Mustafa Kamil had been a student activist in the 1890s involved in the creation of a secret nationalist society that called for British evacuation from Egypt. He was famous for coining the popular expression, "If I had not been an Egyptian, I would have wished to become one."

Egyptian nationalist sentiment reached a high point after the 1906 Dinshaway Incident, when following an altercation between a group of British officers and Egyptian farmers, four of the farmers were hanged while others were condemned to public flogging. Dinshaway, a watershed in the history of Egyptian anti-colonial resistance, galvanized Egyptian opposition against the British, culminating in the founding of the first two political parties in Egypt: the secular, liberal Umma (the Nation, 1907) headed by Ahmed Lutfi el-Sayed, and the more radical, pro-Islamic Watani Party (National Party, 1908) headed by Mustafa Kamil. Lutfi was born to a family of farmers in the Delta province of Daqahliya in 1872. He was educated at al-Azhar where he attended lectures by Mohammed Abduh. Abduh came to have a profound influence on Lutfi's reformist thinking in later years. In 1907, he founded the Umma Party newspaper, el-Garida, whose statement of purpose read: "El-Garida is a purely Egyptian party which aims to defend Egyptian interests of all kinds."

Both the People and National parties came to dominate Egyptian politics until World War I, but the new leaders of the national movement for independence following four arduous years of war (in which Great Britain declared Egypt a British protectorate) were closer to the secular, liberal principles of Ahmed Lutfi el-Sayed and the People's Party. Prominent among these was Saad Zaghlul who led the new movement through the Wafd Party. Saad Zaghlul held several ministerial positions before he was elected to the Legislative Assembly and organized a mass movement demanding an end to the British Protectorate. He garnered such massive popularity among the Egyptian people that he came to be known as 'Father of the Egyptians'. When on March 8, 1919, the British arrested Zaghlul and his associates and exiled them to Malta, the Egyptian people staged their first modern revolution. Demonstrations and strikes across Egypt became such a daily occurrence that normal life was brought to a halt.

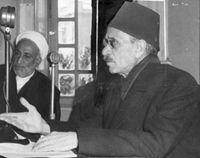
Ahmed Lutfi el-Sayed, fondly known as the "Professor of the Generation"

Ahmed Lutfi el-Sayed Pasha (15 January 1872 – 5 March 1963) was an Egyptian intellectual, anti-colonial activist and the first director of Cairo University. He was an influential person in the Egyptian nationalist movement and used his position in the media to strive and gain an independent Egypt from British rule. He was also one of the architects of modern Egyptian nationalism as well as the architect of Egyptian secularism and liberalism. He was fondly known as the "Professor of the Generation". Lutfi was one of the fiercest opponents of pan-Arabism, insisting that Egyptians are Egyptians and not Arabs. He is considered one of the most influential scholars and intellectuals in the history of Egypt. Ahmed Lutfi al-Sayyid was an outright liberal and believed in equality and rights for all people. Lutfi's contribution to Egypt in intellectual ideas and movements redefined history in Egypt. He was considered one of the first Egyptian officials to introduce Mill's works and reading to the general Arab public so they could educate themselves on concepts of liberalism. He believed that people should have a say in what goes on in their government and country, and that all people had certain civil rights that could not be taken away. He was a staunch proponent of anti-colonialism and the negative effects it has on countries, which is what led to him being such an active member of the anti-British involvement in Egypt. He took a strong stance against the pan-Arabism view that was held at that time which emphasized a unification of all Arab countries and people into one entity. He believed that Egyptians were different from Arabs and had their own separate beliefs and cultural aspects.

=== 1923 Constitution ===
The Wafd Party drafted a new Constitution in 1923 based on a parliamentary representative system. Saad Zaghlul became the first popularly elected Prime Minister of Egypt in 1924. Egyptian independence at this stage was provisional, as British forces continued to be physically present on Egyptian soil. In 1936, the Anglo-Egyptian Treaty was concluded. New forces that came to prominence were the Muslim Brotherhood and the radical Young Egypt Party. In 1920, Banque Misr (Bank of Egypt) was founded by Talaat Pasha Harb as "an Egyptian bank for Egyptians only", which restricted shareholding to native Egyptians and helped finance various new Egyptian-owned businesses.

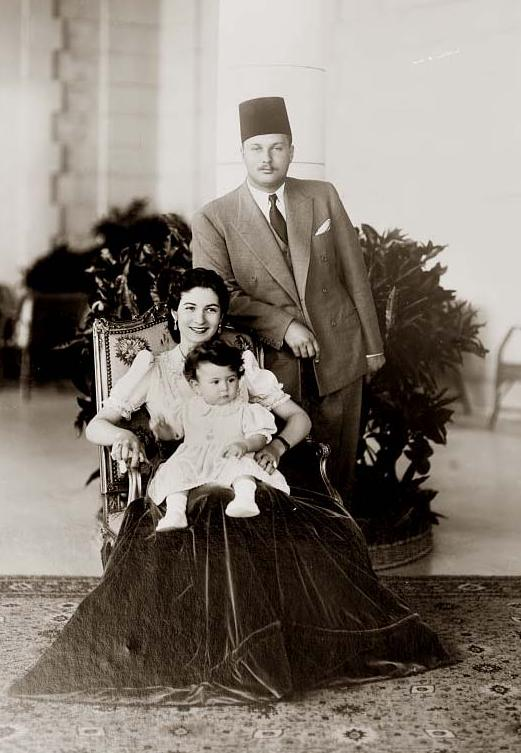
King Farouk I, Queen Farida and their first-born daughter Princess Ferial c. 1940

=== Notables of the liberal age ===
Under the parliamentary monarchy, Egypt reached the peak of its modern intellectual Renaissance that was started by Rifa'a el-Tahtawy nearly a century earlier. Among those who set the intellectual tone of a newly independent Egypt, in addition to Muhammad Abduh and Ahmed Lutfi el-Sayed, were Qasim Amin, Muhammad Husayn Haykal, Taha Hussein, Abbas el-'Akkad, Tawfiq el-Hakeem, and Salama Moussa. They delineated a liberal outlook for their country expressed as a commitment to individual freedom, secularism, an evolutionary view of the world and faith in science to bring progress to human society.

In his dialogues with close associate and journalist Mohamed Salmawy, published as Mon Égypte, Naguib Mahfouz had this to say:

Egypt is not just a piece of land. Egypt is the inventor of civilisation... The strange thing is that this country of great history and unsurpassed civilisation is nothing but a thin strip along the banks of the Nile... This thin strip of land created moral values, launched the concept of monotheism, developed arts, invented science and gave the world a stunning administration. These factors enabled the Egyptians to survive while other cultures and nations withered and died... Throughout history Egyptians have felt that their mission is to tend to life. They were proud to turn the land green, to make it blossom with life. The other thing is that Egyptians invented morality long before the major religions appeared on earth. Morality is not just a system for control but a protection against chaos and death... Egypt gave Islam a new voice. It didn't change the basic tenets of Islam, but its cultural weight gave Islam a new voice, one it didn't have back in Arabia. Egypt embraced an Islam that was moderate, tolerant and non-extremist. Egyptians are very pious, but they know how to mix piety with joy, just as their ancestors did centuries ago. Egyptians celebrate religious occasions with flair. For them, religious festivals and the month of Ramadan are occasions to celebrate life.

Nasr Hamid Abu Zayd (also Abu Zaid or Abu Zeid; July 10, 1943 – July 5, 2010) was an Egyptian Qur'anic thinker, author, academic and one of the leading liberal theologians in Islam. He is famous for his project of a humanistic Qur'anic hermeneutics, which "challenged mainstream views" on the Qur'an sparking "controversy and debate." While not denying that the Qur'an was of divine origin, Zayd argued that it was a "cultural product" that had to be read in the context of the language and culture of seventh century Arabs, and could be interpreted in more than one way. He also criticized the use of religion to exert political power. In 1995 an Egyptian Sharia court declared him an apostate, this led to threats of death and his fleeing Egypt several week later. (He later "quietly" returned to Egypt where he died.) Abu Zayd's critical approach to classical and contemporary Islamic discourse in the fields of theology, philosophy, law, politics, and humanism, promoted modern Islamic thought that might enable Muslims to build a bridge between their own tradition and the modern world of freedom of speech, equality (minority rights, women's rights, social justice), human rights, democracy and globalisation.

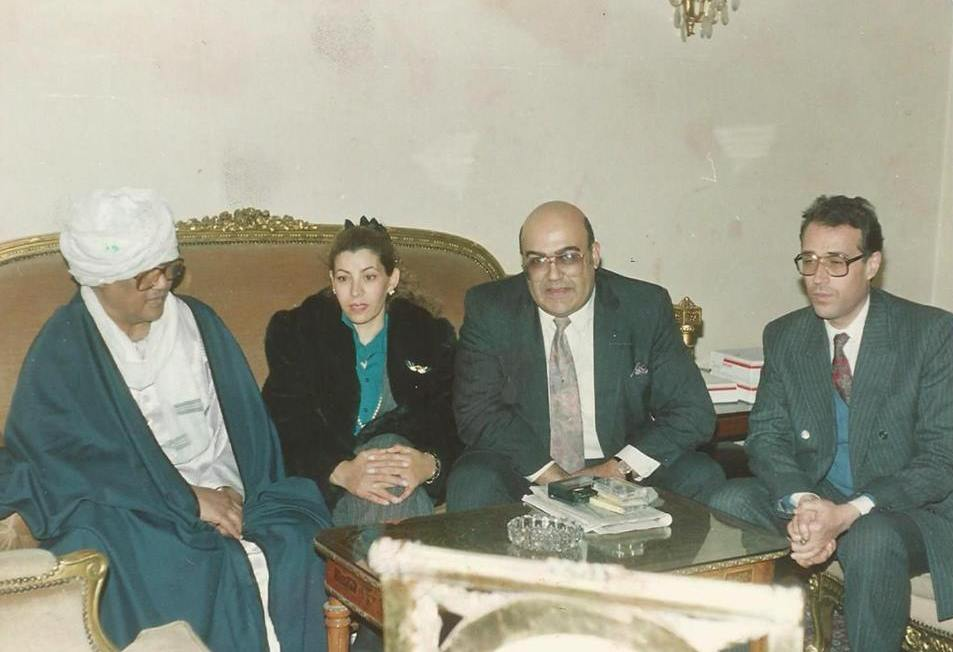
Farag Foda, second from the right

Farag Foda (also Faraj Fawda; 1946 – 9 June 1992), was a prominent Egyptian professor, writer, columnist, and human rights activist. Foda felt that he was defending Islam against its distortion by Islamists, stating ‘Islam is a religion and Muslims are human beings; religion is blameless, while humans make mistakes’. After an Islamist periodical condemned as immoral the broadcast of the ballet Swan Lake on television, he argued that the problem lay with "the onlooker (mushahid) rather than the looked upon (mushahad)" and quoted passages from a 1979 book The Jurisprudence of Looking in Islam, which directs men to avoid looking at both women and men and, "in particular, smooth-faced boys". In a column in October magazine, he lamented, "the world around us is busy with the conquest of space, genetic engineering and the wonders of the computer," while Muslim scholars concern themselves with sex in paradise. He was assassinated on 9 June 1992 by members of Islamist group al-Gama'a al-Islamiyya after being accused of blasphemy by a committee of clerics (ulama) at Al-Azhar University. In December 1992, his collected works were banned. In a statement claimed responsibility for the killing, Al-Gama'a al-Islamiyya accused Foda of being an apostate from Islam, advocating the separation of religion from the state, and favouring the existing legal system in Egypt rather than the application of Sharia (Islamic law). The group explicitly referred to the Al-Azhar fatwā when claiming responsibility.

=== After 2000 ===
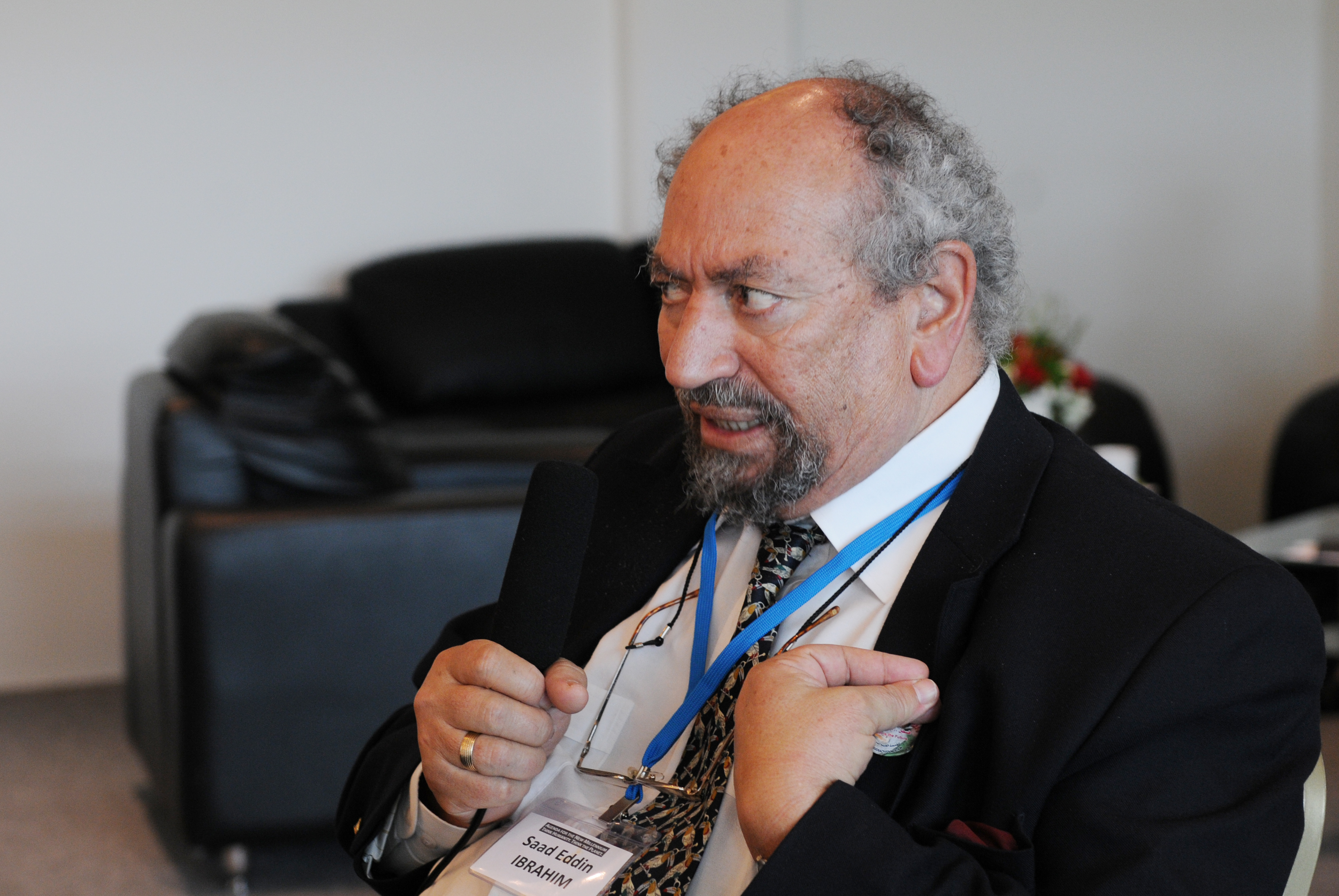
Saad Eddin Ibrahim, founder of Ibn Khaldun Center for Development Studies

Saad Eddin Ibrahim (born 3 December 1938) is an Egyptian American sociologist and author. He is one of Egypt's leading human rights and democracy activists, and a strong critic of former Egyptian president Hosni Mubarak. He is the founder of the Ibn Khaldun Center for Development Studies in Cairo, the Arab Organization for Human Rights and the Arab Council of Childhood and Development.

==== Democratic Front Party ====
The Democratic Front Party was liberal party founded in 2007 by Ahmed Diab and Yehia El Gamal. It was a full member of both the Liberal International and the Alliance of Democrats It merged with the Free Egyptians Party in December 2013.

==== April 6 Youth Movement ====
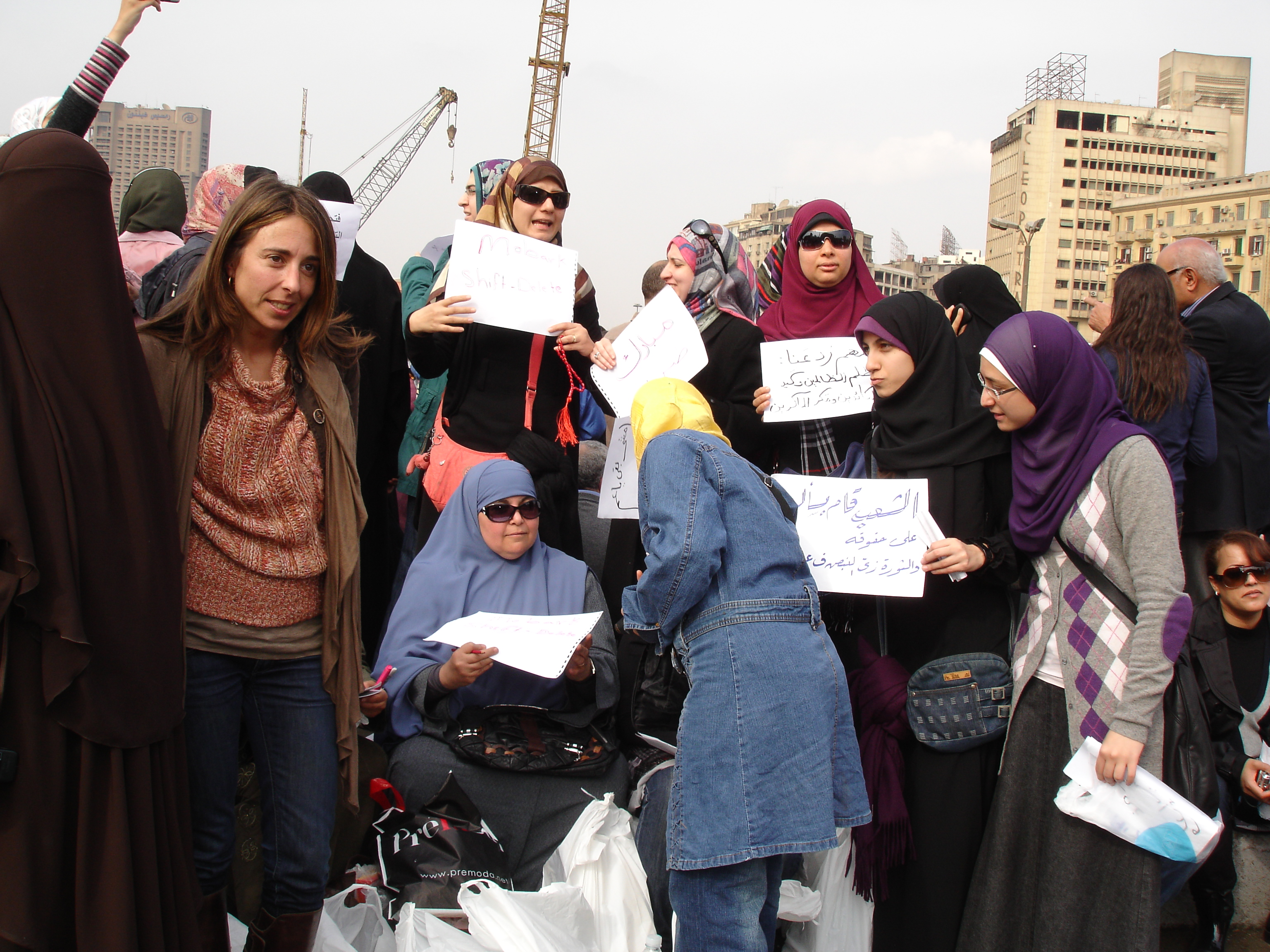
Women in Tahrir Square protest the rule of Hosni Mubarak.

The April 6 Youth Movement (Arabic: حركة شباب 6 أبريل) is an Egyptian activist group established in Spring 2008 to support the workers in El-Mahalla El-Kubra, an industrial town, who were planning to strike on April 6.

Activists called on participants to wear black and stay home on the day of the strike. Bloggers and citizen journalists used Facebook, Twitter, Flickr, blogs and other new media tools to report on the strike, alert their networks about police activity, organize legal protection and draw attention to their efforts.

The New York Times has identified the movement as the political Facebook group in Egypt with the most dynamic debates. As of January 2009, it had 70,000 predominantly young and educated members, most of whom had not been politically active before; their core concerns include free speech, nepotism in government and the country's stagnant economy. Their discussion forum on Facebook features intense and heated discussions, and is constantly updated with new postings.

The April 6 movement is using the same raised fist symbol as the Otpor! movement from Serbia, that helped bring down the regime of Slobodan Milošević and whose nonviolent tactics were later used in Ukraine and Georgia. Mohammed Adel, a leader in the April 6 movement, studied at the Centre for Applied Nonviolent Action and Strategies, an organization founded by former Otpor! members. The movement was banned by an Egyptian court on 28 April 2014. The Constitution Party condemned the verdict, arguing that the charges against the movement were "false" and that the court ruling was an example of state institutions undermining and destroying the rule of law. Hamdeen Sabahi's presidential campaign warned of the "return to a state of suppression and banning." Abdul Ghaffar Shukr, vice president of the National Council for Human Rights, has stated that the council is prepared to stand in solidarity with the April 6 Youth Movement, and will aid the movement if it requests assistance. Human Rights Watch condemned the ruling as "a clear violation of citizens’ rights to free association, peaceful assembly, and free expression." The April 6 movement has vowed to defy the ban, as well as attempt to repeal it.

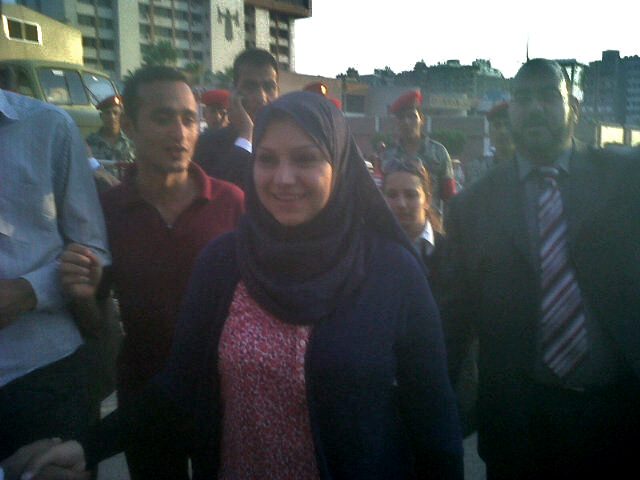
Asmaa Mahfouz

Asmaa Mahfouz (born 1 February 1985) is an Egyptian activist and one of the founders of the April 6 Youth Movement. She has been credited by journalist Mona Eltahawy and others with helping to spark a mass uprising through her video blog posted one week before the start of the 2011 Egyptian revolution. She is a prominent member of Egypt's Coalition of the Youth of the Revolution and one of the leaders of the Egyptian revolution.

==== Egyptian revolution of 2011 ====
The Egyptian revolution of 2011, locally known as the January 25 Revolution (Egyptian Arabic: ثورة 25 يناير; Thawret 25 yanāyir), began on 25 January 2011 and took place across all of Egypt. It consisted of demonstrations, marches, occupations of plazas, riots, non-violent civil resistance, acts of civil disobedience and strikes. Millions of protesters from a range of socio-economic and religious backgrounds demanded the overthrow of Egyptian President Hosni Mubarak. The revolution included Islamic, liberal, anti-capitalist, nationalist and feminist elements. Violent clashes between security forces and protesters resulted in at least 846 people killed and over 6,000 injured. Protesters burned over 90 police stations. The protests took place in Cairo, Alexandria and other cities.

Following the 2011 Revolution and election of Muslim Brotherhood leader Muhammad Morsi to the presidency, the term "liberal" was used loosely in Egypt to refer to those who rallied around opposition to Morsi and the 2012 constitution. On November 22, 2012, Morsi had issued a decree granting himself "extraordinary, unquestioned authority". He had also "rammed" a new constitution through the constitutional assembly which included "expanded presidential powers, protections for the military, and a highly illiberal social agenda". The constitution was passed in a December 2012 referendum with low 33% turnout. This liberal bloc has been described as "really a coalition between genuine liberals, socialists, and some of the less objectionable Mubarak loyalists", or as "the flock of non-Islamist political parties and figures routinely lumped together as `liberals,` despite the fact that many of them have rejected any notion of political pluralism, a defining characteristic of liberalism."

==== Egyptian Social Democratic Party ====
The Egyptian Social Democratic Party is a social liberal and a social democratic party in Egypt. It was founded after the 2011 Egyptian Revolution by the merger of two minor liberal parties, the Liberal Egyptian Party, and the Egyptian Democratic Party on 29 March 2011.

Notable members include Mohamed Abou El-Ghar, film maker Daoud Abdel Sayed, activist Amr Hamzawy, Mervat Tallawy, former UN under-secretary and executive secretary of ESCWA, Hazem Al Beblawi, former executive secretary of the ESCWA and Ziad Bahaa El-Din. However, Amr Hamzawy resigned from the party in April to form the Freedom Egypt Party on 18 May 2011.

==== National Salvation Front ====
The National Salvation Front (also known as the National Front for Salvation of the Revolution or the National Rescue Front, Arabic: جبهة الإنقاذ الوطني) is an alliance of Egyptian political parties, mainly secular and ranges from liberals to leftists, formed to defeat Egyptian President Mohammed Morsi's 22 November 2012 constitutional declaration.

The front issued three demands to Morsi during the 2012 Egyptian protests. The demands were: that the constitutional declaration be rescinded, that the referendum be called off, and that a new constituent assembly be formed.

==== 2012–13 Egyptian protests ====
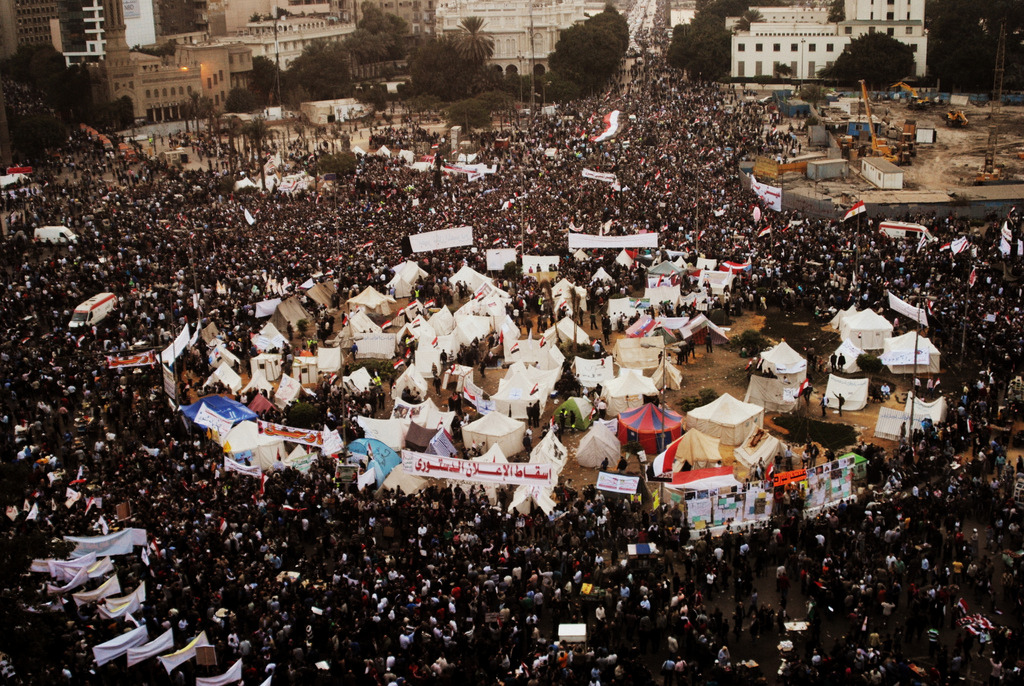
Demonstrators in Cairo's Tahrir Square on the morning of 27 November 2012

The 2012–13 Egyptian protests were part of a large scale popular uprising in Egypt against then-President Mohamed Morsi. On 22 November 2012, Protests began against Morsi, after his government announced a temporary constitutional declaration that in effect granted the president unlimited powers. Morsi deemed the decree necessary to protect the elected constituent assembly from a planned dissolution by judges appointed during the Mubarak era.

The demonstrations were organized by Egyptian opposition organizations and individuals, mainly liberals, leftists, secularists and Christians. The demonstrations resulted in violent clashes between Morsi-supporters and the anti-Morsi protesters, with dozens of deaths, hundreds of injuries and various cases of sexual assault against women during anti-Morsi demonstrations. Egypt Independent reported that one of the dead was Fathy Ghareeb, a founder of the Socialist Popular Alliance Party, who died by suffocation caused by the tear gas fired by the Central Security Forces (CSF) in Tahrir Square. Demonstrators gathered outside the presidential palace, which in turn was surrounded by tanks and armored vehicles of the Republican Guard. The anti-Morsi protesters in Cairo were estimated at 200,000, while over 100,000 supporters of Morsi gathered in Cairo to show support. A number of Morsi's advisers resigned in protest, and many judges spoke out against his actions as well. Resignations were tendered by the director of state broadcasting, Rafik Habib (Christian vice president of the Muslim Brotherhood's Freedom and Justice Party), and Zaghloul el-Balshi (general secretary of the commission overseeing the planned constitutional referendum). Seven members of Morsi's 17-member advisory panel resigned in December 2012.

==== Third Square ====
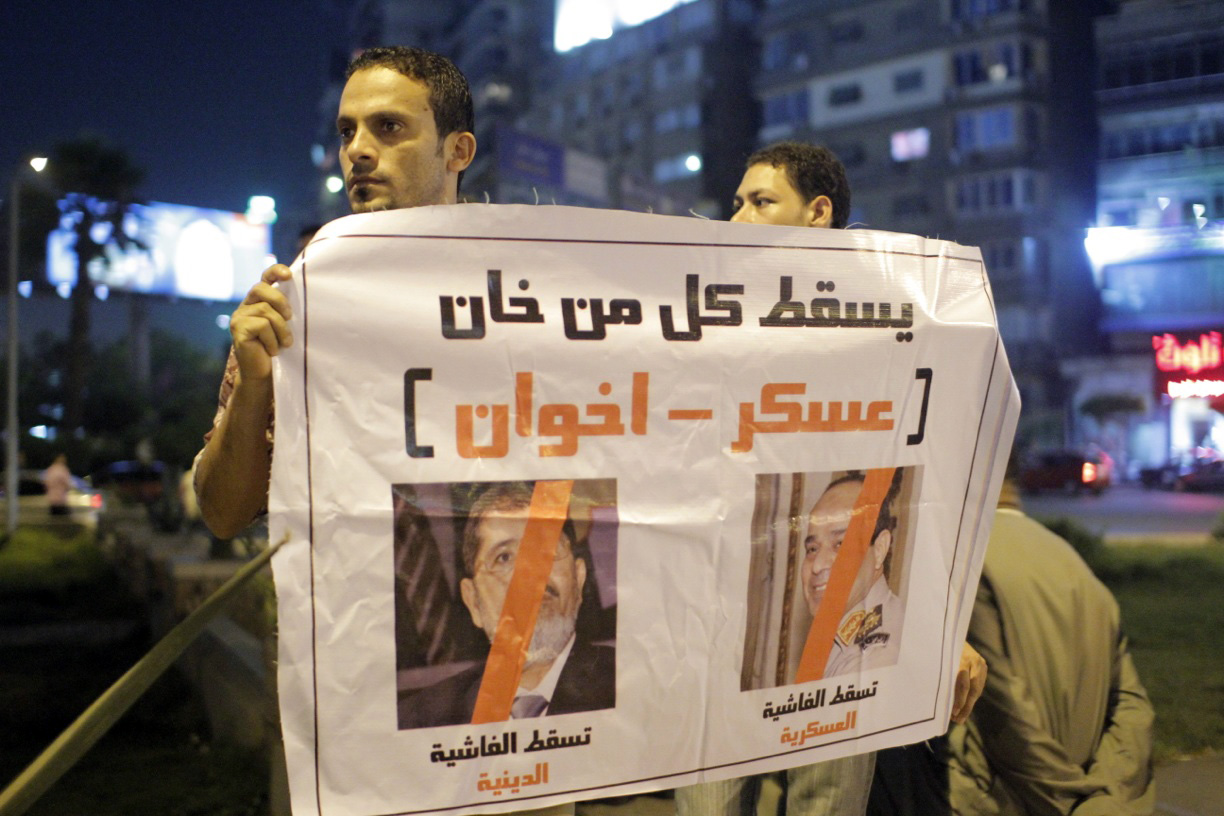
Protesters from the Third Square movement: "Neither Morsi nor the military", 31 July 2013

The Third Square (Arabic: الميدان الثالث) is an Egyptian political movement created by liberal, leftist and moderate Islamist activists who reject both Muslim Brotherhood and military rule following the 2013 Egyptian coup d'état. The movement first appeared when the Egyptian defence minister, General Abdel Fattah el-Sisi, called for mass demonstrations on 26 July 2013 to grant the military a "mandate" to crack down on "terrorism", which was seen as contradicting the military's pledges to hand over power to civilians after removing Morsi and as an indication for an imminent crackdown against Islamists. The announcement by General Al-Sisi was rejected by a number of political groups that had initially supported the military coup, such as the revolutionary April 6 Youth Movement, the moderate Strong Egypt Party, the Salafi Al-Nour Party and Egyptian human rights groups.

In response, The Third Square, a group of activists who mistrust both the military and the Islamists, called for a separate protest in Sphinx Square in Mohandessin, Cairo. One of the activists described the movement as "a group of young people whose views are not represented either in Tahrir Square or Rabia Al-Adawiya", referring to the military-organised protests in Tahrir Square and the Islamist protests in Rabia Al-Adawiya square in Nasr City. In a leaflet, they declared their opposition to "the defense minister calling for an authorization to kill Egyptians on the pretext of fighting terrorism".

Interviewed on the French television news channel France 24, activist Firas Mokhtar said: "The Third Square is an attempt to bring Egyptians together and put an end to the polarisation of our society". Fellow activist and singer of Egyptian band Eskenderella, Samia Jahin, added: "Maybe there's only a few of us tonight. But soon you might hear of another group like ours in another square."

The movement is supported by intellectuals and artists such as the activist filmmaker Aalam Wassef, who released a music video showing him sitting out the demonstrations on 26 July at home, doing his laundry in front of a banner with the word "Resist".

==== Free Egyptians Party ====
The Free Egyptians Party is an Egyptian liberal party, founded on 3 April 2011 after the 2011 Egyptian revolution. It supports the principles of a liberal, democratic, and secular political order in Egypt. The Free Egyptians Party became the largest party in the House of Representatives after the 2015 Egyptian parliamentary election and remained so until the 2020 elections.

Prominent party members include Naguib Sawiris, Farouk El-Baz, Ahmed Fouad Negm, Gamal El-Ghitani, Khaled Bichara, Mohamed Abu Hamed, Essam Khalil.

In March 2012, former deputy chairman and member of parliament Mohamed Abu Hamed resigned from the party to found Life of the Egyptians Party, and later with Ahmed Shafik the Egyptian Patriotic Movement.

==== Constitution Party ====
The Constitution Party (Arabic: حزب الدستور, romanized: Ḥizb el-Dostour) is a political party in Egypt. Founded by Nobel Peace Prize laureate Mohamed ElBaradei and a group of Egyptian intellectuals and activists on 28 April 2012, it aims to protect and promote the principles and objectives of the 2011 Egyptian revolution, according to liberal ideals. The Constitution Party "aims to build a new Egypt based on democratic governance, education, competence, experience and the rule of law." Respect for human rights, advancing the Egyptian economy, providing for the basic needs of citizens, and advancing social equality are among the party's primary goals. The principles of the party are summarized in its slogan, "Bread, Freedom, and Social Justice."

Following the 2013 coup that overthrew Morsi, there was a shift in Egyptian public opinion away from Liberalism of the revolution towards "an increasingly hardline, pro-military, anti-Islamist stance". The old liberal opposition became split between supporters of the coup (such as Tamarod), and liberals who thought the military crackdown – particularly the August 2013 raids on Brotherhood protest camps that killed hundreds – went too far (such as Mohamed ElBaradei). Opponents of Morsi who "stood by the military as it ousted the president, but eventually broke away in the face of mounting state violence and mass arrests of Islamists under the guise of a `war on terror`”, became a minority attacked on state and private media.

Current liberal figures in Egypt include television comedian, Bassem Youssef, who has been attacked by television salafi shiekhs for their "outlandish allegations" against liberal protestors, and also opposed the crushing of the Muslim Brotherhood.

== Liberal political groups ==
=== Historical liberal parties ===
- Wafd
- Al-Umma

=== Active liberal political groups ===
In the Mubarak and post-Mubarak era some of the contemporary Egyptian liberal parties are the Democratic Front Party (Hizb el-Gabha eldimocratia), the Tomorrow Party (Hisb el-Ghad), and the New Wafd Party (Hizb el-Wafd el-Gedid). The latest liberal party that came to prominence, "Hizb El Ghad", was founded in November 2004. A split headed by its original founder, Ayman Nour, formed the Revolution's Tomorrow Party (Ḥizb Ghad el-Thawra) in 2011. After the Egyptian Revolution of 2011 many liberal parties came out to light such as the Free Egyptians Party and the Egyptian Social Democratic Party.

- Free Egyptians Party- El-Masreen El-Ahrar Party-
- Ghad
- Ghad El-Thawra Party
- Hizb el-Gabha el-Dimocratia: Ossama Al-Ghazaly Harb
- New Wafd Party -Hizb al-Wafd al-Jadid- (re-establishment of the Wafd Party)
- Egyptian Social Democratic Party
- Cairo Liberal club

== See also ==
- Politics of Egypt
- List of political parties in Egypt
