= Amira Saber =

- أميرة صابر

Member of the Egyptian Senate
- Incumbent
- Assumed office 2025

Member of the Egyptian House of Representatives
- In office 2020–2025

Personal details
- Born: Cairo, Egypt
- Party: Egyptian Social Democratic Party
- Education: Faculty of Science, Ain Shams University

Amira Saber Qandil is an Egyptian politician, social activist, and parliamentarian. She was a member of the Egyptian House of Representatives from (2020 - 2025) and was chosen as the Secretary of the Foreign Relations Committee in the House. She is currently a member of the Egyptian Senate from 2025 to the present, and serves as the Secretary of the Human Rights and Social Solidarity Committee in the Senate. She is the Vice President of the Egyptian Social Democratic Party and a member of the Coordinating Committee of the Coordination of Youth of Parties and Politicians (CPYP). In 2024, she was elected as the representative for the Middle East and North Africa region on the Global Young MP Initiative Steering Committee of the World Bank, and was chosen as the co-chair of the first youth network of parliamentarians affiliated with the International Monetary Fund. She has also been a member of the Board of Trustees of the Egyptian National Dialogue since 2022, in addition to several other positions.

Also, she plays a leading role in the field of social work. She is the founder and Secretary-General of the Kayan Foundation for Community Development, a board member of Displaced International, which deals with refugee issues, a member of the Supreme Council of Culture, and a member of the Parliamentary Network of the Organisation for Economic Co-operation and Development (OECD).

She adopts a number of vital and legislative issues in Egypt, most notably: women's rights, the women, peace and security file, participating in many local and international events and dialogues to discuss development and empowerment issues, digital health issues, technical education, digital transformation, and the rights of persons with disabilities. She also presented parliamentary proposals that faced widespread discussion, most notably her proposal directed at establishing a national human tissue bank and facilitating tissue donation after death to support burn patients.

== Education ==
She obtained a bachelor's degree in Biochemistry and Chemistry from the Faculty of Science, Ain Shams University in 2012, then a Master of Business Administration in International Marketing – ESLSCA University, followed by a Master's in Development Studies and Economics – Institute of Development Studies (IDS), University of Sussex in 2021. She is a PhD researcher specializing in Business Administration - Swiss School of Management.

She also obtained a specialized certificate in Parliamentary Studies from McGill University in Canada, a diploma in Islamic Studies from the Higher Institute of Islamic Studies, a diploma in Social Entrepreneurship from Ashoka University, and liberal studies in arts and sciences from the Cairo Institute of Liberal Arts and Sciences.

== Political career ==
She joined the Egyptian Social Democratic Party and became a member of the Coordinating Committee of the Coordination of Youth of Parties and Politicians, which elected her within its list, and she won the House of Representatives elections in 2020. In 2021, she was chosen as the Secretary of the Foreign Relations Committee in the House of Representatives. She worked as a media spokesperson for Farid Zahran's presidential campaign in Egypt. In 2025, she was elected to the Egyptian Senate, winning a seat, and was chosen to assume the position of Secretary of the Human Rights and Social Solidarity Committee in the Senate. She was selected as Vice President of the Egyptian Social Democratic Party in 2024. She also assumed membership in the Board of Trustees of the Egyptian National Dialogue (since June 2022), through which she contributed to drafting political and economic visions with the participation of various national forces.

As a member of parliament, she participated in adopting many important issues in Egypt, especially regarding women's rights, digital security, the rights of persons with disabilities, the environment, and others, The most prominent legislation she worked on included: the draft law on organizing the combating of food waste in 2022, the draft law on adapting to climate change, the draft law on AI governance in 2024, and amendments to the Competition Protection and Anti-Monopoly Law. She also led, through her party (the Egyptian Social Democratic Party), an opposition front and expressed reservations on some articles of the draft Criminal Procedures Law. She submitted fundamental amendments, such as amending Article (45) to grant the right to inmates' relatives or their agents to submit direct complaints to the Public Prosecution in the event of intransigence in detention facilities. As a result of this opposition, she contributed to the President returning the law to the House of Representatives and not ratifying it, before the House decided in September 2026 to postpone the implementation of the law until 2027.

Photo from the Egyptian National Dialogue Conference in 2022

=== National Tissue Bank project ===
In 2025, she submitted a proposal in the Egyptian Senate directed to the Minister of Health and Population regarding the establishment of a national human tissue bank to support burn victims, based on the Organ Transplant Law in Egypt (Law No. 5 of 2010). The proposal addressed humanitarian and medical motives and goals related to supporting patients with advanced burns to provide the skin and vital tissues necessary to save the lives of thousands of patients and reduce the exorbitant import costs borne by several charitable organizations in Egypt.

The MP presented main tracks to implement the proposal to turn it into reality. These include starting by establishing an experimental tissue bank inside a specialized burn hospital (such as the Sheikh Zayed Burn Hospital) or in cooperation with specialized civil society institutions like Ahl Masr Foundation, establishing a national electronic registry for post-mortem donors while unifying coordination protocols between hospitals and intensive care units, and transferring modern technology to train Egyptian medical cadres through cooperation protocols with accredited international tissue banks. She also mentioned in her statements that there is a plan and committees studying the proposal by the Ministry of Health with the aim of expanding to establish 3 tissue banks by 2028.

The proposal provoked public opinion and garnered popular and media outrage and uproar due to confusion in addressing the proposal, as some pages and media outlets presented a distorted view of the proposal, portraying it from a commercial perspective or as a disfigurement of the deceased's body. Amira confirmed in television interviews that the proposal was addressed in a distorted and incorrect manner, clarifying that donation is completely optional and free, and is a noble humanitarian act that complies with Sharia fatwas and is supported by Dar al-Ifta al-Misriyyah. She announced her personal desire to be the first to officially document the donation of her skin and tissues after her death to support and spread this culture. On the other hand, this proposal received wide media attention and community debate, as well as support among a large segment of the public, authorities, and institutions, which praised this proposal and its important humanitarian role.

== Other roles ==
She has other roles in the field of social work, where she co-founded the "Kayan" Foundation for Community Development and served as the Secretary-General of the foundation, which is a non-governmental organization active in the fields of community development, supporting the most needy groups, and building the capacities of youth and women. She is also a member of the Oxford Climate Leadership Research Centre at Oxford University.

She has also worked in other roles, including co-chair of the Steering Committee of the Global Young MP Initiative of the World Bank and the International Monetary Fund, as an elected representative for the Middle East and North Africa region since 2024. She is also a member of the Women Parliamentarians Program at the Munich Security Conference, a member of the Advisory Committee for the Ministerial Group for Entrepreneurship, a fellow of the Public Leadership program at Vital Voices, a member of the Parliamentary Network of the OECD, and a member of the Women Political Leaders network.

== Awards and recognition ==
Recipient of the Social Impact Award from the British Council 2026.
