= Ahmed Lutfi el-Sayed =

Egyptian academic and politician

- Egyptian Nationalist Ahmed Lutfi
- Born: 15 January 1872; Berqin, Egypt
- Died: 5 March 1963 (aged 91); Egypt

Ahmed Lutfi el-Sayed or Aḥmad Luṭfī Sayyid Pasha (IPA: [ˈæħmæd ˈlotˤfi (ʔe)sˈsæjjed]) (15 January 1872 – 5 March 1963) was a prominent Egyptian nationalist, intellectual, anti-colonial activist and the first president of Cairo University. He was an influential person in the Egyptian nationalist movement and used his position in the media to strive and gain an independent Egypt from British rule. He was also one of the architects of modern Egyptian nationalism as well as the architect of Egyptian secularism and liberalism. He was fondly known as the "Professor of the Generation". Lutfi was one of the fiercest opponents of pan-Arabism, insisting that Egyptians are Egyptians and not Arabs. He is considered one of the most influential scholars and intellectuals in the history of Egypt.

== Early life and education ==
Lutfi was born in the rural village of Berqin, near Al Senbellawein in the Dakahlia Governorate on 15 January 1872. He was educated in a traditional kuttāb, a government school in Manṣūra, the Khedivial Secondary School in Cairo and the School of Law in Cairo. While at law school, Al-Sayyid made contact with influential people such as Muhammad Abduh and Hassuna al-Nawawi. Abduh played a pivotal role in Lutfi's experience with his reformist movement as well as his ideology concerning politics.

== Writings and scholarly work ==
After graduating from law school, Lutfi entered the legal department of government services and worked there until 1905, then under the British administration of Lord Cromer. Lutfi became editor-in-chief of a newspaper called Al Jarida in 1907. The paper was prominent for writing enlightened and liberal materials and attracted the attention of many liberal activists. The writings Lutfi composed for Al Jarida during his time as editor-in-chief are considered his most important and influential. He expounded upon his liberal beliefs about the freedom of Egypt and how people must stand up take action in the newsletters; because of these views, Lutfi created a name for himself in the media and government of Egypt.

== Denshaway incident ==
The Denshawai incident was a violent clash that occurred in June 1906 between Egyptian peasants in the village of Denshaway and British officers who were pigeon hunting in the area. The British had occupied Egypt in 1882 and deployed troops to help put down the Urabi Rebellion, an Egyptian constitutionalist movement. On 13 June 1906, five British officers were hunting for pigeons in Denshaway, an area that needs approval from a headsman. The hunt was approved, but the headsman was not with the officers.

They shot pigeons belonging to villagers, angering the owners. The major catalyst was the accidental shooting of the wife of the prayer leader, Abd-el-Nebi, at the local mosque. Enraged, the Egyptian villagers attacked the British officers, who opened fire on them in response, wounding five; the officers also set fire to a grain silo owned by Abd-el-Nebi. Abd-el-Nebi, whose wife was seriously injured, struck one of the officers with a stick. He was joined by the elderly Hassan Mahfouz, whose pigeons had been killed. Other villagers threw stones at them. The officers surrendered their weapons, along with their watches and money, but this failed to appease the villagers. Two officers escaped, one of whom managed to contact his superiors; the other died of heatstroke some distance from the village. An Egyptian peasant who tried to help the dying officer was killed by soldiers who came across them and assumed the peasant had in actuality killed him. Meanwhile, the elders had intervened, rescuing the remaining officers and allowing them to return to their camp.

After the incident, 52 villagers were arrested for crimes of violence against the British officers. The trial for the villagers was administered by Ahmed Lutfi-al Sayyid. As editor-in-chief of Al Jarida, Lutfi was able to spread word of the incident quickly, including news of the villagers who had been put on trial. He participated as attorney in the trial after finding out that his daughter was directly involved, which prompted Lutfi to take action. A statement by Lutfi describing the treatment of the accused read: "They fell upon Denshwai, and spared neither man nor his brother. Slowly they hanged the one and flogged the other." It was the Denshwai incident which triggered the creation of the first Egyptian political party created by Lutfi.

== Hizbal-Umma ==
In 1907 after the Denshawai incident, Ahmed Lutfi el-Sayed founded Egypt's first political party, el-Umma ("the Nation"), which came as a reaction to the 1906 Denshaway incident and the rise of Egyptian nationalist sentiment. Lutfi's earlier work with Al Jarida helped his cause from the numerous writings he published in the paper along with his gaining support upon the Denshwai incident. His involvement during this time is considered to be one of the most pivotal roles in the evacuation of British forces in the 20th century. It was also in 1907 that Lutfi published the Al Jarida, a collection of his nationalist ideas and opinions on political issues, whose statement of purpose read: "Al Jarida is a purely Egyptian party which aims to defend Egyptian interests of all kinds". Lutfi introduced the Arab public to the ideas of British philosopher and economist John Stuart Mill and his definition of liberalism.

== Intellectual contribution ==
Ahmed Lutfi al-Sayyid was an outright liberal and believed in equality and rights for all people. Lutfi's contribution to Egypt in intellectual ideas and movements redefined history in Egypt. He was considered one of the first Egyptian officials to introduce Mill's works and reading to the general Arab public so they could educate themselves on concepts of liberalism. He believed that people should have a say in what goes on in their government and country, and that all people had certain civil rights that could not be taken away. He was a staunch proponent of anti-colonialism and the negative effects it has on countries, which is what led to him being such an active member of the anti-British involvement in Egypt. He took a strong stance against the pan-Arabism view that was held at that time which emphasized a unification of all Arab countries and people into one entity. He believed that Egyptians were different from Arabs and had their own separate beliefs and cultural aspects.

== Later years and death ==
From 16 September 1915 to 30 November 1918 Lutfi served as director of the National Library of Egypt. While working for the library, Lutfi did a substantial amount of work including translations from Aristotle through the French versions. He was a member of the Egyptian delegation to the Paris Peace Conference held in Versailles in 1919, where he pleaded for the independence of Egypt from Britain.

Ahmed Lutfi el-Sayed was the first director of the Egyptian University, inaugurated on Monday 11 May 1925. He was a close friend of Taha Hussein and resigned his post as university director as a protest against the Egyptian government's decision to transfer Hussein from his university position in 1932. He resigned again in 1937 when the Egyptian police broke into the court of the Egyptian University. He ultimately stepped down as president in May 1941. During his presidency of the Egyptian University, the first promotion of women graduated with university degrees.

He was known as a great teacher, and one of his students, Husayn Fawzi al-Najjar, wrote a biography of him entitled "Lutfi al-Sayyid, the Teacher of a Generation" (Lutfi al-Sayyid Ustadh al-Jil).

In addition, Ahmed Lutfi el-Sayed held positions such as the minister of education, the minister of interior, the director of the Arabic language assembly, a member of the senate, and the director of House of Books. He died in 1963.

== Influences and legacy ==
A bulk of Lutfi's political influences came from Western rhetoric that he had encountered through his time studying at the law university. His primary influencers were Aristotle, John Locke, Bentham, Mill, Spencer, Rousseau, Comte, and Le Bon. Lutfi saw Egyptian nationalism as the direct result of historical and environmental factors, which is why he was against pan-Islamic, pan-Arab, and pan-Ottoman ideologies. Lutfi was against religion as a basis for nationhood and instead advocated that social and political utility was more important. Lutfi's teachings and works were considered so important that he was dubbed ustād̲h̲ al-d̲j̲īl or “Professor of the Generation.”

== See also ==
- Liberal Egyptian Party
- Egyptian nationalism
