= Egyptian Union of Liberal Youth =

- Company type: Non-profit
- Industry: Education
- Founded: 2007; 19 years ago
- Headquarters: Cairo, Egypt
- Key people: Mahmoud Farouk, Executive Director
- Website: http://euly.org

The Egyptian Union of Liberal Youth (Arabic: اتحاد الشباب الليبرالي المصري, Ittiḥād al-Shabāb al-Librāli al-Miṣri; locally: [etːeˈħæːd eʃːæˈbæːb elːebˈɾˤɑːli]) or EULY, is an Egyptian non-governmental organization which spreads knowledge on the ideas of liberalism among Egyptian youth. The organization was founded in 2007 and has adopted several projects and workshops.

== Projects ==
Euly has created and prepared several projects, independently and in partnership with other organizations . Among these projects are:

=== 2009 ===
The MAJ School

- November 2008 – April 2009, EULY created a project for active youth and young journalists called MAJ (Media – Art – Journalist). The projects aims to promote liberal values in three ways - by creating liberal groups in the media, art, and journalism. The project cooperates between EULY and OSI.

Why am I Liberal?

- February – May 2009: EULY holds a competition inviting students to write essays about liberalism. This competition provides an outlet of self-expression for Middle Eastern youth, who are invited to explain what liberalism means for them. This competition was conducted in cooperation with the Friedrich Naumann Foundation.

=== 2008 ===
Campaign on Egyptian law for NGOs August – November 2008, EULY organized a campaign about Egyptian NGO law. The campaign created a media campaign and movie, which informed youth on Egyptian NGO laws and how NGOs affect their daily lives . This project was jointly operated by EULY and ICNL.

Liberal café June - December 2008: The liberal café offered an informal setting for Egyptian youth to engage in discussions on topics such as liberty, freedom of speech, movies, and liberal parties in Egypt. This event was conducted in cooperation with the Friedrich Naumann Foundation.

Seminar to Join IFLRY Membership October 2008, EULY organized a seminar as part of a process to gain membership in the International Federation of Liberal Youth. The seminar, "Liberalism in the Egyptian Society: How It Could Be Promoted", was attended by the Vice President of IFLY. The seminar was conducted with the help of the Friedrich Naumann Foundation.

On the road EULY Newsletter 2008, EULY published a newsletter to publicize the organization's projects and events. The newsletter also included research papers and articles discussing liberal ideas.

Discover America September – November 2008: EULY organized a program titled "Discover America", outlining the important role that the US plays as a model of liberal democracy and revealed common misconceptions. EULY funded the program and received technical support from the USA Embassy, Egypt.

Life Team (Act for Human Rights) April - August 2008, EULY, started the "LIFE TEAM" project to produce plays – songs – music – movies etc., to promote human rights and liberal ideas and values. Life Team started with program Act for human rights. This project was funded from Freedom House.

Training: Cycle Management of the Civil Institutions 19 – 22 August 2008: EULY held training for Egyptian, Jordanian and Syrian NGO workers on report-writing, successfully monitoring the court system, and making statements on current events.

Workshop: Democracy and Human Rights In July 2008, EULY held a workshop in June for the journalists, bloggers and young leaders of Egyptian political parties. The workshop discussed many things like democracy, shari'a and democracy, Human rights and Shari'a, and that workshop was in cooperation between EULY and Network of Democrats in the Arab world.

Workshop: What Does Liberalism Mean? March 2008, EULY held a workshop on the 22–23 March 2008, to 20 Youth Activist in the Egyptian community, and that workshop was held in the EULY headquarters, and was in cooperation between EULY and ATLAS Economic Foundation.

Workshop: Strategic to Enhance Participation and Improve Performance of Youth Organization February 2008, EULY hosted it to the Youth from Democratic Front Party (ar: الجبهة) (ELGABHA) and that was for five days in Ismailia, Egypt. That workshop was about how to make a Youth organization in a political party, and a trainer from Germany came to that workshop, which was a cooperation between EULY and the Friedrich Naumann Foundation.

=== 2007 ===
Egyptian Liberal Vision Workshops for 150 students from different Egyptian universities, October – December 2007, EULY held five workshops for students from Cairo University, Ain Shams University, Azhar University, University of Alexandria and other private Universities; the workshop discussed what secular government means, and also provided an overview of liberal ideas. The workshop had 150 student participants, and was a cooperative effort of EULY and the Friedrich Naumann Foundation.

The problems faced by liberal in Egyptian society Workshop for youth in the liberal political party held in September 2007, was a workshop for three days in Fayed, Ismailia, the workshop was held for youth in the political parties to know what are the problems that faced by liberal idea in Egypt and in the liberal political parties. The workshop was a first step to work and develop the liberal parties in Egypt. They made that workshop for the New Wafd Party, Democratic Front Party, Liberal Egyptian Party, Tomorrow Party and the National Democratic Party, the project was also a cooperative effort of EULY and the Fredrish Numman Foundation.

Liberal concept campaign Campaign in the Egyptian universities, March 2007, EULY made a campaign in the universities to promote the liberal ideas such as free market economy, freedom, cooperation, and some other booklets, that campaign targeted 1000 students, and was held in the Cairo University in the faculty of law, faculty of Economy and Political science.

== Objectives ==
The main objective of the Liberal Union is to spread liberalism among Egyptian youth, and to inform them of their legal rights, and to develop the youth volunteering in other civil society organizations. Another objective is to develop the youth in the liberal political parties of Egypt, and to make it clear and achievable. Several newspapers and online websites have accused the Egyptian Union of being strictly allied with one of two political parties from the four main liberal parties of Egypt; the Union has published a denouncement of these claims.

== See also ==
- Politics of Egypt
- Youth voice
- Youth vote
- Youth politics
- Egyptian Initiative for Personal Rights (EIPR)
