= Egyptian Social Democratic Party =

Political party in Egypt

Egyptian Social Democratic Party الحزب المصرى الديمقراطى الإجتماعى
- President: Farid Zahran
- Secretary-General: Bassem Kamel (? - present); Khaled Rashed (2016-?)
- Founder: Mohamed Abou El-Ghar
- Founded: 29 March 2011
- Merger of: Liberal Egyptian Party; Egyptian Democratic Party
- Headquarters: 17 Mohamed Mahmoud street, Tahrir square, Cairo
- Youth wing: Union of Egyptian Social Democratic Youth
- Ideology: Social democracy Social liberalism Progressivism
- Political position: Centre-left
- National affiliation: Civil Democratic Movement; Democratic Path Alliance; National Unified List for Egypt (since 2020)
- European affiliation: Party of European Socialists (observer)
- International affiliation: Socialist International; Progressive Alliance
- Colours: Red; Orange
- Slogan: Together for Change; Arabic: معا للتغيير
- House of Representatives: 12 / 596
- Senate: 5 / 300

Website
- egysdp.org

The Egyptian Social Democratic Party (Arabic: الحزب المصرى الديمقراطى الاجتماعى, romanized: al-Ḥizb al-Maṣrī al-Dimuqrāṭī al-Ijtmāʿī, IPA: [elˈħezb elˈmɑsˤɾi ldemokˈɾɑːtˤi leɡteˈmæːʕi]) is a social liberal and social democratic party in Egypt.

The current president of the party is Farid Zahran and vice presidents are Ehab Elkharat, Freddy Elbaiady, Maha Abdelnaser, Mahmoud Samy, Amira Saber, and Khaled Rashed.

== History ==
It was founded after the 2011 Egyptian Revolution by the merger of two minor liberal parties, the Liberal Egyptian Party, and the Egyptian Democratic Party, on 29 March 2011.

Notable founding members include Mohamed Abou El-Ghar, film maker Daoud Abdel Sayed, activist Amr Hamzawy, Mervat Tallawy, former UN under-secretary and executive secretary of ESCWA, and Hazem Al Beblawi, former executive secretary of the ESCWA, and later interim prime minister of Egypt under President Adly Mansour. Hamzawy resigned from the party in April and formed the Freedom Egypt Party on 18 May 2011.

In August 2012, the party was admitted into the Socialist International as a consultative member.

The Egyptian Social Democratic Party and the National Progressive Unionist Rally Party ran in the 2012 Shura council election as part of the Egyptian Bloc. The division of seats between the two parties in the Shura Council is unclear.

The party was accepted into the Party of European Socialists (PES) on 18 February 2013.

Following the removal of Mohamed Morsi from office in July 2013, a founding member of the Social Democratic Party named Ziad Bahaa El-Din was reportedly offered the post of prime minister. Yunis Makhyun, chairman of the Nour Party, objected to Bahaa El-Din's appointment and to the involvement of Mohamed ElBaradei, because both of them belonged to the National Salvation Front. Another founding member of the Social Democratic Party, Hazem Al Beblawi, was appointed as interim prime minister on 9 July. He subsequently suspended his membership in the Social Democratic Party. His cabinet was sworn in on 16 July 2013.

Abou El-Ghar submitted his resignation in September 2015 because of divisions in the party, which the party did not accept. He requested that an election for party leadership be held in October. The party held a leadership election in April 2016 with Farid Zahran and Bassem Kamel competing against Nour Farahat and Bahaa-Eldin; Zahran and Kamel won the race. Zahran and Kamel were seen as more willing to go against president Abdel Fattah el-Sisi, while Farahat and Bahaa-Eldin were "reformist" in comparison.

The party became part of the National Unified List for Egypt ahead of the 2020 Egyptian parliamentary election and the 2020 Egyptian Senate election.

The party nominated Zahran for the 2023 Egyptian presidential election. He came in third place with four percent of the vote.

The party joined the Democratic Path Alliance in June 2025, which also included the Justice Party and the Reform and Development Party, and began negotiations to also join the National Unified List for Egypt. The party was included in the National Unified List when its nomination papers were submitted in mid-October, ahead of the 2025 Egyptian parliamentary election. It won 11 elected seats.

The secretary general of the party, Bassem Kamel, stated in a January 2026 interview that leadership elections were planned to be held in April 2025, but postponed due to the upcoming elections and are planned to be held as soon as they can.

== Electoral history ==
=== Presidential elections ===
Election	Party candidate	Votes	%	Result
2023	Farid Zahran	1,776,952	4.01%	Lost ✗

=== People's Assembly elections ===
Election	Seats	+/–	Result
2011	16 / 508	▲16	Opposition

=== House of Representatives elections ===
Election	Seats	+/–	Result
2015	4 / 596	▼12	Opposition
2020	7 / 596	▲3	Opposition
2025	12 / 596	▲5	

=== Shura Council elections ===
Election	Seats	+/–	Result
2012	8 / 300	▲8	Opposition

=== Senate elections ===
Election	Seats	+/–	Result
2020	3 / 300	▼5	Opposition
2025	5 / 300	▲2	Opposition
