= Freddy Elbaiady =

Member of the Egyptian Parliament

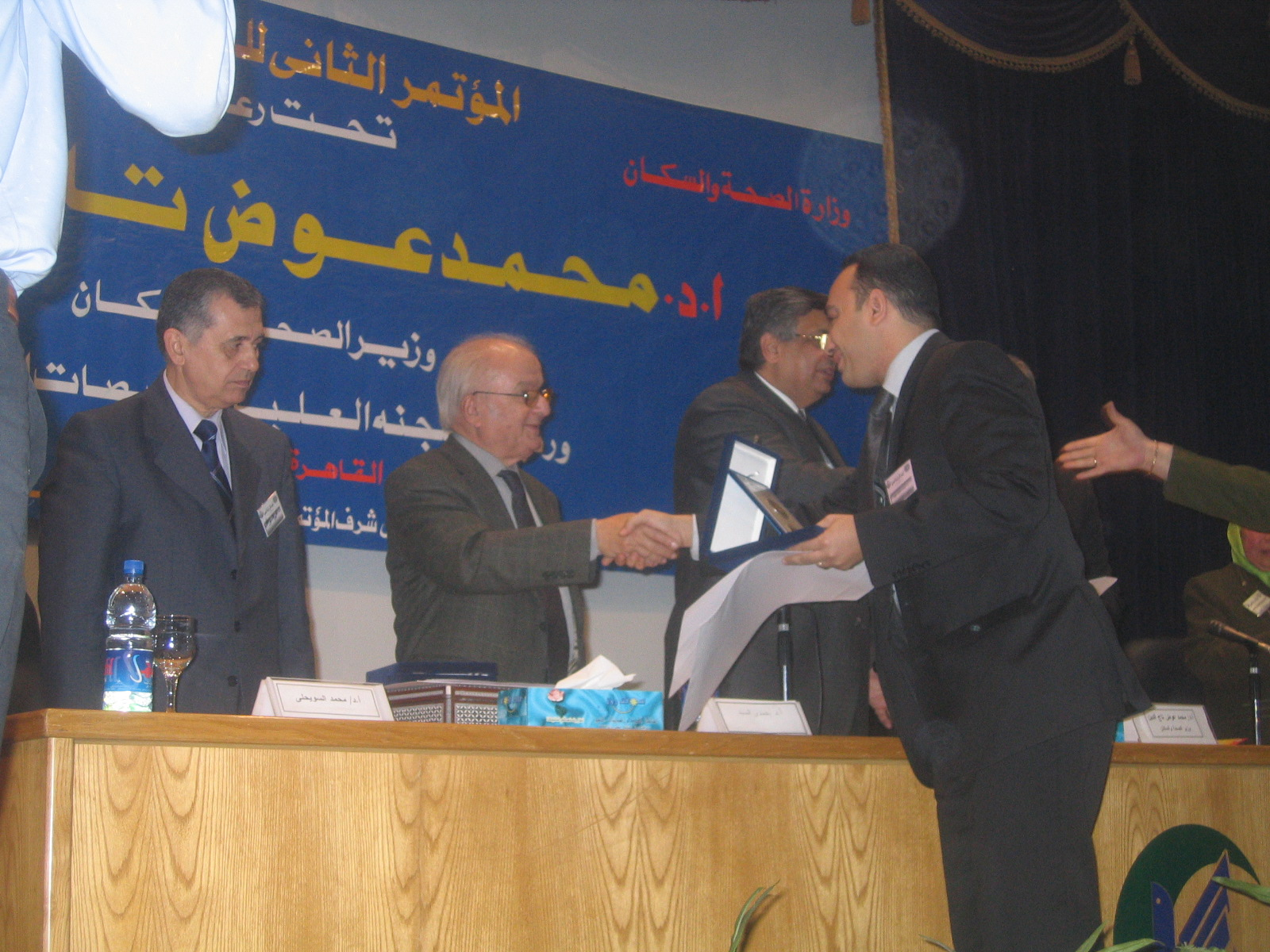
Dr. Freddy Elbaiady receiving a medal of honour from the Minister of Health

Freddy Safwat Naguib Elbaiady (Egyptian Arabic: فريدي البياضي) is an elected member of the Egyptian Parliament (House of Representatives). He also serves as vice president of the Egyptian Social Democratic Party.

He previously served as a member of the Shura Council, the upper house of the Egyptian Parliament, to which he was appointed in 2012. He resigned from the Council on 29 June 2013.

== Education ==
Freddy Elbaiady was born on January 1, 1971, in Cairo, Egypt to a Coptic family.

Elbaiady studied medicine at the Cairo University School of Medicine, where he specialised in radiology. He received professional training at the Queen Elizabeth Hospital Birmingham in England and in Hoorn, the Netherlands.

He has worked as a radiology consultant and is a member of the Radiological Society of North America and the British Institute of Radiology, and a fellow of the Egyptian Board of Radiology. Elbaiady is also the founder and CEO of the Salam Medical Center.

== Political career ==
Freddy Elbaiady was elected in the December 2020 elections as a member of the Egyptian House of Representatives on the National List for the Egyptian Social Democratic Party. In January 2021, he was selected by the presidency of the council to serve on the General Committee of the House of Representatives. He was elected vice president for foreign affairs of the Egyptian Social Democratic Party in May 2022.

=== Political history ===
In 2011, Elbaiady was nominated by the Wafd Party to head its electoral list for the parliamentary elections, but he declined the nomination, stating that he did not wish at the time to be affiliated with any political party.

He supported the 2011 Egyptian revolution against Hosni Mubarak's regime. Following the revolution, he was appointed by Deputy Prime Minister Yehia El-Gamal to participate in the National Consensus Conference, which considered principles for a new constitution and monitored the interim period.

In December 2012, Elbaiady was appointed by President Mohamed Morsi to the Shura Council, the upper house of the Egyptian Parliament. He served as an independent member and joined the Human Rights Committee and the Constitutional Committee.

Earlier in his political career, Elbaiady joined the former National Democratic Party (NDP) in his hometown of El-Qanatir El-Khayriya. The NDP, which was the ruling party prior to the 2011 revolution, was dissolved following Mubarak's removal. Elbaiady expressed an interest in healthcare and community social services and declined several NDP nominations for the parliamentary elections.

During his tenure in the Shura Council, he objected to the proposed parliamentary elections law and called for the resignations of the Minister of Interior and the Prime Minister following the killing and injury of demonstrators in January 2012.

He also criticised the Ministry of Interior and the presidency following sectarian violence in the Khousous area and the subsequent attack on the Coptic Cathedral during the funeral of victims. He accused the Minister of Interior of failing to protect the cathedral and presented video evidence in parliament to support his claims.

Elbaiady called in parliament for early presidential elections and was the first MP during Morsi's presidency to hold a red card and wear a slogan reading "A new president is needed," prompting strong reactions from Muslim Brotherhood MPs.

He later announced his support for the Tamarod movement. On 29 June 2013, Elbaiady resigned from parliament during a Tamarod press conference. In his written resignation, he cited the repeated failure of the parliament and the presidency to meet the demands of the revolution, and stated that he joined the protests calling for President Morsi to step down.

Elbaiady joined the Egyptian Social Democratic Party during his term in parliament and continued as a member of its supreme committee after his resignation.

Following the removal of President Morsi and the appointment of a transitional government, Elbaiady remained active through his party and community initiatives, advocating for a democratic civil state.

In 2015, Elbaiady was elected president of the Egyptian Social Democratic Party in South Qalyubia Governorate, a position he continues to hold.

== Egyptian Protestant Church involvement ==
In 2008, Freddy Elbaiady was elected as a member of the Protestant Churches of Egypt Supreme Council. He was re-elected for another term in 2016. Elbaiady served as president of the Presbyterian Churches' junior high youth committee from 2004 to 2012. He is also a member of the Middle East Council of Churches Peace, Justice and Human Rights Committee.

He has participated in and lectured at numerous local and international conferences on human rights, Christian education, and leadership training. He has also delivered lectures in churches and international conferences in the United States and Europe, focusing primarily on promoting peace within communities through medical charity initiatives.

== Community activity ==
Elbaiady is the founder and CEO of the Salam Medical Center (SMC), located in El-Qanatir El-Khayriya. Established in 1996, SMC is a registered not-for-profit organization that serves approximately 40,000 patients annually.

SMC has been recognised for its role in providing quality healthcare in the local community and has gained attention in Egypt and abroad as a model for peacebuilding through community service.

Salam Medical Center relies on a group of qualified medical staff who volunteer their services. Both Muslims and Christians work together within the organisation.
