= Mervat Tallawy =

Egyptian diplomat and politician (born 1937)

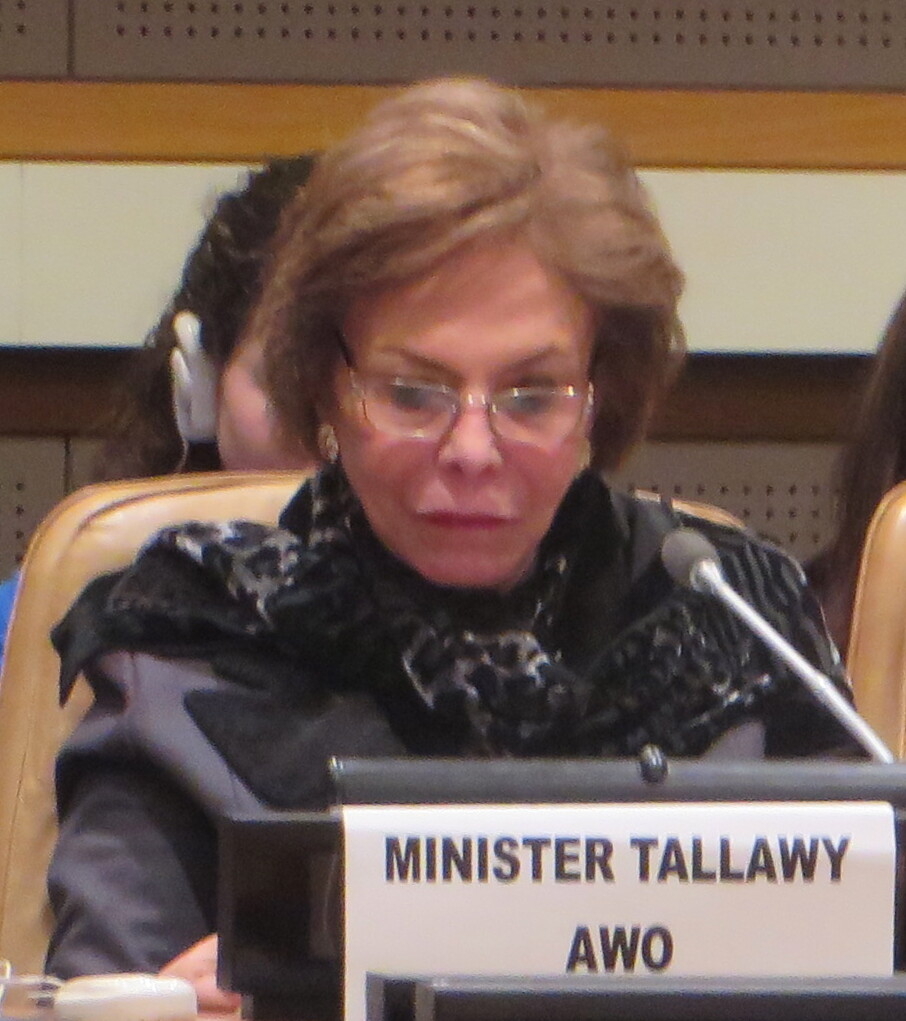
- Tallawy in 2015

Personal details
- Born: 1937 (age 88–89) Minya, Egypt
- Party: Egyptian Social Democratic Party
- Education: American University in Cairo; Graduate Institute of International Studies
- Occupation: Diplomat; political activist

Mervat M. Tallawy (Egyptian Arabic: ميرڤت التلاوى, pronounced [ˈmeɾvæt ettælˈlæːwi]; born 1937) is an Egyptian diplomat and politician.

Tallawy holds a B.A. in political science and business administration from the American University in Cairo. She also completed studies at the Graduate Institute of International Studies (HEI) in Geneva, Switzerland. In 1963, she joined the Egyptian Ministry of Foreign Affairs.

From 1985 to 1988, Tallawy was the deputy director of the United Nations International Research and Training Institute for the Advancement of Women (UN-INSTRAW). Subsequently, she was the ambassador of Egypt in Vienna, Austria, until 1991. From 1991 to 1993, she was assistant foreign minister. From 1993 to 1997, she served as Egypt's ambassador to Japan. Tallawy held the post of the Minister for Insurance and Social Affairs of Egypt from 1997 to 1999.

On 22 November 2000, Tallawy was appointed Under-Secretary-General of the United Nations and executive secretary of the United Nations Economic and Social Commission for Western Asia (ESCWA). In 2007, she was succeeded by Bader Al-Dafa from Qatar.

Tallawy is a board member of the Sawiris Foundation for Social Development and an executive member of the 2011 founded left liberal Egyptian Social Democratic Party.

== Honors ==
- Order of the Rising Sun, Gold and Silver Star (2017)
