= Bader Al-Dafa =

Qatari diplomat

Bader Al Dafa (Arabic: بدر الدفع) is a Qatari diplomat who has been the Executive Director of the Global Dryland Alliance since 2012. He served from 2007 to 2010 as the United Nations Executive Secretary of the Economic and Social Commission for Western Asia (ESCWA). He was appointed to the position by United Nations Secretary-General Ban Ki-moon in July 2007.

A seasoned diplomat, Al Dafa has acquired extensive experience in foreign affairs. He was the recent Ambassador of Qatar to the United States and Permanent Observer to the Organization of American States (OAS). In addition, he has served as Qatar's Ambassador to the Russian Federation, France, Egypt and Spain, and as non-resident Ambassador to Switzerland, Greece, Finland, Latvia, Lithuania, Estonia, and Mexico.

His official ESCWA online biography added, "Besides his diplomatic experiences, he has also served in a variety of capacities in international non-governmental organizations. He supervised programmes of building housing for families with limited income in Africa and participated in landmine clearing programmes in the Balkans. He also played an active role in fund-raising programmes with children's hospitals in Asia and North America and in supporting the empowerment of women in North Africa and Central Asia. He also organized conferences on free trade, democracy and inter-religious dialogue.

Al Dafa holds a master's degree in international public policy from Johns Hopkins University and a bachelor's degree in political science and economics from Western Michigan University. He obtained the award the Ordre du Merite from France. He is fluent in Arabic, English and Spanish.
