= Al Jarida =

Egyptian biweekly newspaper (1907–1915)

- Type: Biweekly newspaper
- Owner(s): Umma Party
- Founder(s): Ahmad Lutfi Al Sayyid; Talaat Harb
- Editor-in-chief: Ahmad Lutfi Al Sayyid (1907–1911); Mohammed Hussein Heikal (1911–1915)
- Founded: 1907
- Political alignment: Liberal
- Language: Arabic
- Ceased publication: 1915
- Headquarters: Cairo
- Country: Egypt

Al Jarida (Arabic: الجريدة, romanized: al-Jarīdah, lit. 'The Newspaper') was a liberal newspaper which was published in Cairo, Egypt, from 1907 to 1915. The paper was the official organ of the Umma Party. It was one of the publications that shaped the Egyptian nationalist culture containing the Westernized elements and was very influential during its existence.

== History and profile ==
Al Jarida was established in 1907 as a biweekly publication and claimed to be "a purely Egyptian paper" which aimed to defend the rights and interests of the Egyptians. The first issue appeared on 9 March. The paper was owned by a company with the same name of which shareholders included Ahmad Lutfi Al Sayyid, Mahmoud Suleiman, Hassan Abdel Raziq, Ibrahim Said and Mahmoud Abdel Ghaffar. The paper was founded by Ahmad Lutfi Al Sayyid and Talaat Harb. The former edited the paper between 1907 and 1911. Mohammed Hussein Heikal replaced Al Sayyid in the post in 1911.

In 1907 the Umma Party was also founded, and Al Jarida became its official media outlet. The target audience of the paper was wealthy landowners and reformists who were close to the Umma Party. Its contributors were young writers and intellectuals as well as feminists. They included Taha Hussein, Mohammed Hussein Heikal and Malak Hifni Nasif, a woman writer and poet, who published articles using the pen name Bahithat Al Badiya (Arabic: Seeker of the Desert). Nasif's articles were mostly on women, and she criticized the marriages between Egyptian men and European women, arguing that these marriages were not consistent with the Islamic principles and that these were examples of the "colonial occupation." The paper frequently covered economy-related articles some of which were written by Talaat Harb.

Al Jarida folded in 1915. Its successors were Al Sufur and Al Siyasa.
