= Global Dryland Alliance =

International agricultural organisation

- Founded: October 2017
- Type: International organization
- Headquarters: Doha, Qatar

The Global Dryland Alliance (GDA) is an international organization composed of dryland countries and is headquartered in Doha, Qatar. Officially formed in October 2017 with a membership of 11 countries, the organization has the stated aim of advancing food security for dryland nations and innovating technologies in the fields of agriculture and water security.

== History ==
Preliminary drafts for the establishment of the GDA were first laid out in 2011. In September 2011, Qatari diplomat Nassir Abdulaziz Al-Nasser first publicly brought up the idea of forming a group for dryland countries at a United Nations (U.N.) meeting as a way to help improve food security. Qatari capital Doha played host to a meeting of sixteen prospective member countries and various potential partner groups in September 2012. The next year, Qatari Emir Tamim bin Hamad Al Thani pledged a full committal to the formation of the GDA at the 68th U.N. General Assembly.

At the Ministerial Conference on Food Security in Drylands held in May 2015 in Marrakesh, Morocco, a draft establishment treaty of the GDA was presented to the delegations in attendance. The inaugural GDA conference took place on 15 October 2017 in Doha, during which the foundation treaty was signed by representatives of 13 countries. During the conference, it was announced that Qatar would fund the organization for the following two years and that its base of operations would be in Doha.

== Mission ==
According to the GDA, one-third of the world's population live in drylands, which make up roughly 40% of the Earth's land surface. Drylands face many agricultural and water challenges due to several factors such as droughts, temperature extremes, soil erosion and shallow soil depth. Hence, the GDA has outlined several ways to help improve the food security of nations with large swathes of drylands, such as forming partnerships with private and public sector organizations, sharing and developing technologies that will help boost food security, financing food security projects in member countries, and addressing food security policies of dryland countries.
