= Ziad Bahaa-Eldin =

Egyptian economist, commercial lawyer and politician

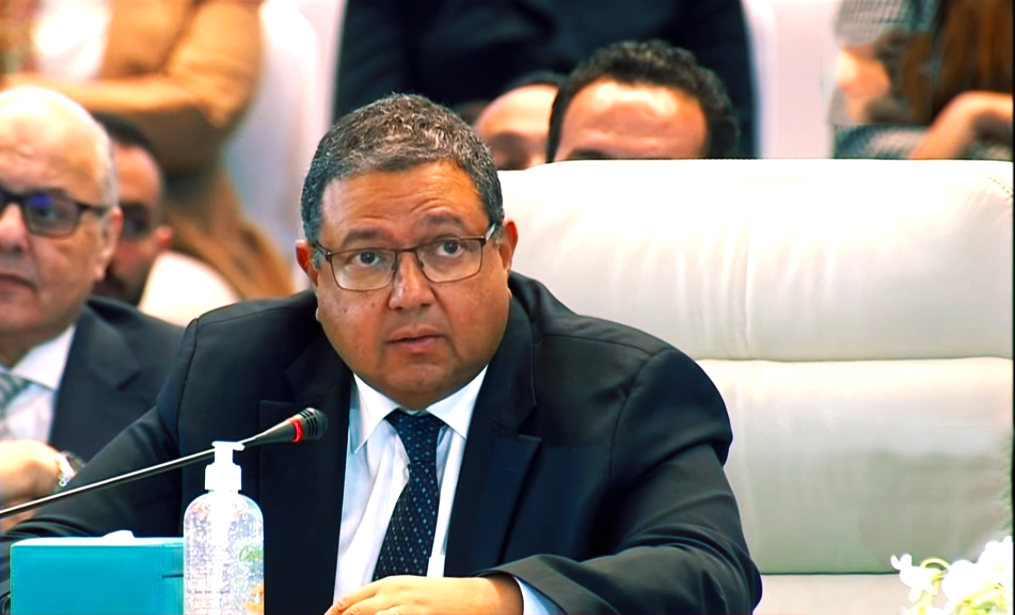

Deputy Prime Minister of Egypt
- In office 12 July 2013 – 30 January 2014
- Prime Minister: Hazem Al Beblawi
- Preceded by: Mohamed Kamel Amr
- Succeeded by: Vacant

Minister of International Cooperation
- In office 16 July 2013 – 30 January 2014
- Prime Minister: Hazem Al Beblawi
- Preceded by: Ashraf Fatah
- Succeeded by: Vacant

Personal details
- Party: Independent
- Other political affiliations: Egyptian Social Democratic Party (until 12 July 2013)
- Education: Cairo University; American University in Cairo; King's College London (LLM); London School of Economics

Ziad Ahmed Bahaa-Eldin (Arabic: زياد بهاء الدين; born 30 August 1964) is an Egyptian economist, commercial lawyer and politician.

== Biography ==
Ziad Bahaa-Eldin was born on 30 August 1964 and is the son of the journalist and writer Ahmad Baha-Eldin. He was educated at Cairo University (Law, 1986), the American University in Cairo (Economics, 1987), King's College London (LLM, 1989) and the London School of Economics (PhD, 1996). Baha Eddin practiced as a lawyer, held several government positions related to finance and law, and served as a lecturer at the Law Faculty of Cairo University. From 2004 to 2007 he was the chairman of the Egyptian Investment Authority. In 2008 he became the head of the Egyptian Financial Supervisory Authority, a government agency that supervises Egypt's non-banking financial transactions and markets. He has served as an International Advisor at Goldman Sachs.

Following the overthrow of Hosni Mubarak in 2011, he was one of the founders of the Egyptian Social Democratic Party (ESDP) and was a member of parliament. News reports on 7 July 2013 stated that he was likely to be appointed interim prime minister by the authorities that seized power in the 2013 Egyptian coup, though this appointment was blocked within the post-coup coalition by the Salafist Al Nour Party. On 12 July 2013 Al Arabiya reported that he had been chosen as Egypt's interim deputy prime minister. After his appointment he suspended his membership in the Social Democratic Party. He resigned on 27 January 2014.

Bahaa-Eldin competed in an April 2016 ESDP leadership election, running to be the deputy head of the party, but he lost to a list headed by Farid Zahran, whose vice president is Bassem Kamel.
