= Mohamed Abou El-Ghar =

Egyptian professor of gynecology

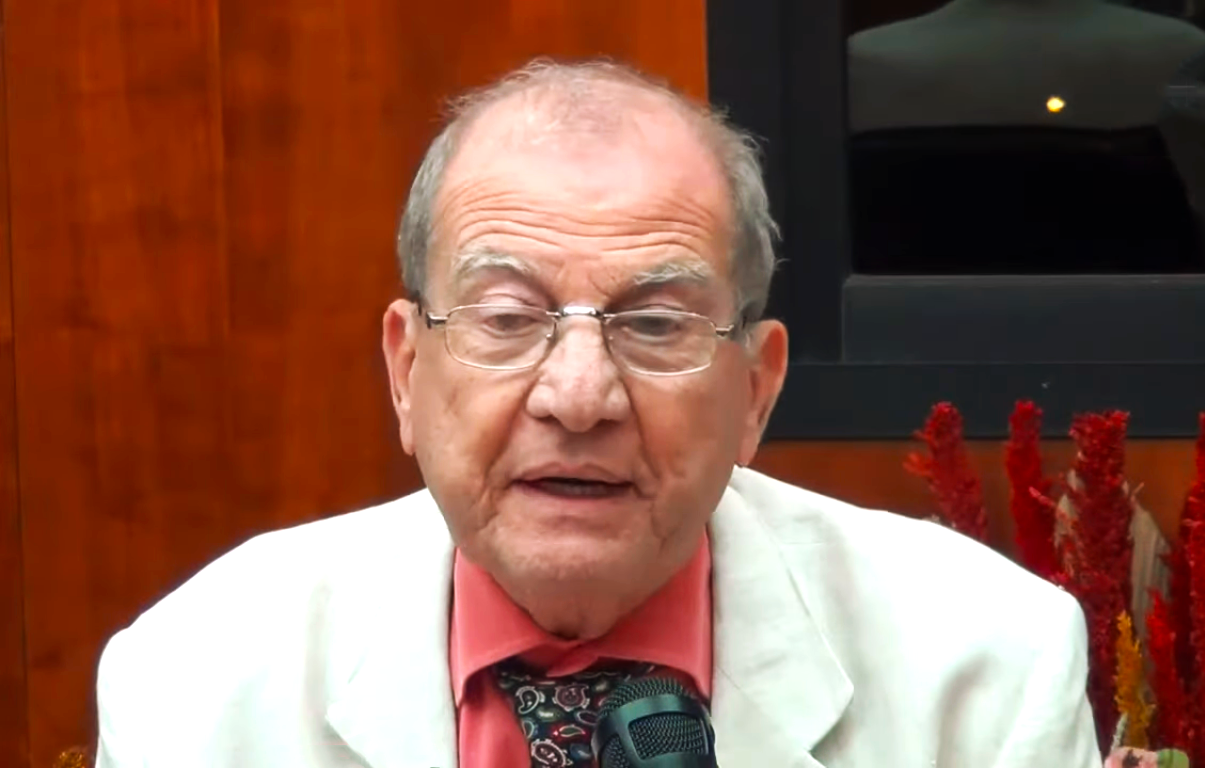

President of the Egyptian Social Democratic Party
- In office 29 March 2011 – 1 April 2016
- Preceded by: Position established
- Succeeded by: Farid Zahran

Personal details
- Born: 2 July 1940 (age 85) Shibin El Kom, Monufia Governorate
- Party: Egyptian Social Democratic Party
- Occupation: Gynecologist, Political Activist

Mohamed Abou El-Ghar, also spelled Abul-Ghar, or Aboulghar (Egyptian Arabic: محمد ابو الغار, IPA: [mæˈħæmmæd abu lˈɣɑːɾˤ]; born on 2 July 1940 in Shibin El Kom, Egypt) is an Egyptian professor of gynecology at Cairo University and a political activist.

Abou El-Ghar studied medicine at the Cairo University, and received his doctoral degree in 1969. As a doctor, he acquired prominence as Egypt's pioneer of in vitro fertilisation. During the rule of Hosni Mubarak, he and other professors founded the "March 9th Movement for the Independence of Universities" against the security control on the Egyptian universities. During the Egyptian Revolution of 2011, he demanded democratisation of Egyptian universities.

After the 2011 Egyptian revolution, Abou El-Ghar with some Egyptian political activists, including Amr Hamzawy, and Daoud Abdel Sayed, founded the left liberal Egyptian Social Democratic Party. Moreover, he is a spokesman of the National Association for Change close to Mohamed ElBaradei.

He has been on the board of trustees of the Sawiris Foundation for Social Development.

He submitted his resignation from the ESDP in September 2015 over divisions in the party, though it was rejected.

Party elections took place in April 2016 and he was succeeded by Farid Zahran.
