= Farid Zahran =

Egyptian politician

Farid Zahran فريد زهران
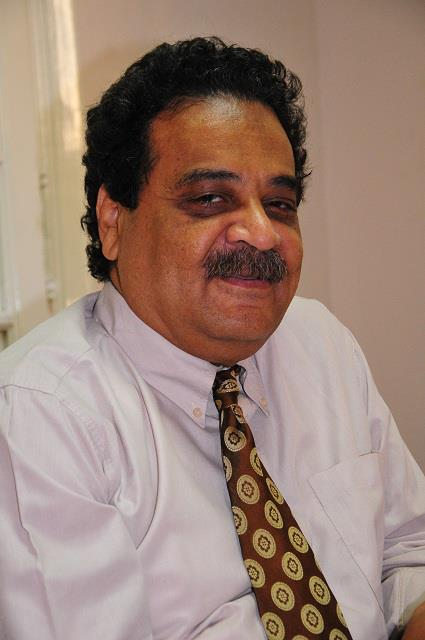

President of The Egyptian Social Democratic Party
- Incumbent
- Assumed office 1 April 2016
- Preceded by: Mohamed Abu El-Ghar

Personal details
- Born: 5 December 1964 (age 61) Cairo, Egypt
- Party: Egyptian Social Democratic Party (2011–present)
- Education: Cairo University

Mohamed Farid Saad Zahran (born in Cairo, 1957) is an Egyptian social democratic politician and thinker. He is the president of the Egyptian Social Democratic Party (ESDP), in addition to being the chairman of the Board of Directors of the Mahrousa Center for Publishing, Press Services and Information.

== Career ==
He ran to be the head of the Egyptian Social Democratic Party alongside his deputy Bassem Kamel in April 2016, defeating Nour Farahat and Ziad Bahaa-Eldin.

On 20 September 2023, he announced his candidacy for the 2023 Egyptian presidential election. He came in third place.
