= United Nations Economic and Social Commission for Western Asia =

Specialized body of the United Nations

Coordinates: 33.8946°N 35.5021°E

United Nations Economic and Social Commission for West Asia
- Abbreviation: ESCWA
- Formation: 9 August 1973; 53 years ago
- Type: Regional commission of the United Nations Economic and Social Council
- Legal status: Active
- Headquarters: Beirut, Lebanon
- Head: Rania Al-Mashat
- Parent organization: United Nations Economic and Social Council
- Website: www.unescwa.org

The United Nations Economic and Social Commission for Western Asia (ESCWA; Arabic: الإسكوا) is one of the five regional commissions of the United Nations Economic and Social Council (ECOSOC). It comprises 21 Arab member states and promotes economic and social development, regional cooperation and integration.

Its activities include research, policy analysis, statistical work, intergovernmental dialogue, and technical cooperation and policy advice. ESCWA supports its member states in addressing economic, social and environmental development challenges and implementing the 2030 Agenda for Sustainable Development.

The secretariat is based in Beirut and is headed by an Executive Secretary with the rank of Under-Secretary-General. Rania A. Al-Mashat of Egypt has held the post since June 2026.

== History ==
=== Establishment and Name ===
The Economic and Social Council (ECOSOC) established the Economic Commission for Western Asia (ECWA) through resolution 1818 (LV) of 9 August 1973. On 26 July 1985, ECOSOC adopted resolution 1985/69,renaming it the Economic and Social Commission for Western Asia, in recognition of the social dimension of its work. Environmental concerns subsequently became part of the Commission’s mandate, encompassing the economic, social and environmental dimensions of sustainable development.

=== Headquarters ===
ESCWA began operations in Beirut in 1974. Its headquarters moved to Baghdad in from 1982 to 1991 and Amman from 1991 to 1997, before returning to Beirut, its permanent headquarters. The Secretariat is housed in the UN House on Riad El Solh Square in central Beirut, Lebanon.The ESCWA Technology Centre, established in 2010, is based in Amman, Jordan.

== Membership ==
A map showing the member states of the Commission

ESCWA comprises 21 Arab member states.

- Algeria
- Bahrain
- Djibouti
- Egypt
- Iraq
- Jordan
- Kuwait
- Lebanon
- Libya
- Mauritania
- Morocco
- Oman
- Palestine
- Qatar
- Saudi Arabia
- Somalia
- Sudan
- Syria
- Tunisia
- United Arab Emirates
- Yemen

== Executive secretaries ==
The following is a list of the Executive Secretaries of the Commission since its foundation:

Term	Name of Executive Secretary	Home Country
1974–1985	Mohammad Said Al-Attar	North Yemen
1985–1988	Mohammad Said Al-Nabulsi	Jordan
1989–1993	Tayseer Abdel Jaber	Jordan
1993–1995	Sabbaheddin Bakjaji	Syrian Arab Republic
1995–2000	Hazem El Beblawi	Egypt
2000–2007	Mervat Tallawy	Egypt
2007–2010	Bader Al-Dafa	Qatar
2010–2017	Rima Khalaf	Jordan
2017–2018	Mohamed Ali Alhakim	Iraq
2019–2026	Rola Dashti	Kuwait
2026– present	Rania Al-Mashat	Egypt

Sources for the table:

== Governance ==
The Commission is the highest body within the organization. It holds a session at ministerial level once every two years. Reporting to it are 10 subsidiary bodies, namely the Executive Committee and nine specialized subsidiary committees, which help to formulate its programme plan and act as an interface between member States and the secretariat’s substantive experts.

The Executive Committee, steers all ESCWA activities between ministerial sessions. It organizes the sessions of the Commission, reviews and adopts the programme of work of the subsidiary committees, ensures consistency between sub-programmes and deals with all matters related to programme planning.

The Nine specialized committees include the Statistical Committee, the Committee on Social Development, the Committee on Energy, the Committee on Water Resources, Committee on Transport and Logistics, the Committee on Women, the Committee on Technology for Development and the Committee on Trade Policies.

== Areas of Work ==
ESCWA’s work addresses the economic, social and environmental dimensions of sustainable development in the Arab region. It supports member states through research and policy analysis, statistics, intergovernmental dialogue, technical cooperation and capacity-building, with regional integration and implementation of the 2030 Agenda for Sustainable Development as cross-cutting priorities.

Its substantive work is organized around six thematic areas: Climate Change and Natural Resource Sustainability; Gender Justice, Population and Inclusive Development; Shared Economic Prosperity; Statistics, Information Society and Technology; 2030 Agenda and SDG Coordination; and Governance and Conflict Prevention.

ESCWA produces publications and other knowledge products, including reports, studies, policy briefs and statistical resources on development issues in the Arab region. It also develops data portals and interactive tools to support analysis and inform policymaking.The ESCWA Knowledge Repository provides long-term preservation, organization and dissemination of its openly available digital knowledge products.

ESCWA and the League of Arab States jointly developed Arab Vision 2045, a regional framework for long-term development. It was a central theme of the Commission’s thirty-first session in Cairo in December 2023 and was subsequently endorsed at the Arab Summit in Baghdad in May 2025.

== Funding ==
ESCWA is funded mainly from the United Nations regular budget, under section 22 of the program budget, which the General Assembly approves. Other resources come from the Regular Program of Technical Cooperation, the United Nations Development Account and voluntary contributions from governments and other donors.

== Controversies ==
On 15 March 2017 ESCWA published a report “Israeli Practices towards the Palestinian People and the Question of Apartheid” by Richard Falk and Virginia Tilley. The report concluded that Israel had established an apartheid regime over the Palestinian people. Israel condemned the report. Secretary-General António Guterres distanced himself from it, and it was removed from United Nations websites on 17 March 2017. That day, Executive Secretary Rima Khalaf resigned the in protest at the request to withraw the report.

== See also ==
- United Nations System
- United Nations Economic Commission for Africa (overlapping membership)
