= Liberal Egyptian Party =

Liberal Egyptian Party الحزب المصري الليبرالي
- Chairman: Mahmoud El Pher'oni
- Founded: 2003
- Dissolved: 2011
- Merged into: Egyptian Social Democratic Party
- Headquarters: Cairo
- Ideology: Secular liberalism Economic liberalism Pharaonism
- Political position: Centre
- Colours: Red white Black

The Liberal Egyptian Party (Arabic: الحزب المصري الليبرالي, Al Hizb Al Misri Al Librali), formerly Mother Egypt Party, was a liberal and secular political party in Egypt advocating democracy and patriotism. This liberal party was a political party in Egypt until the merger with another liberal party, the Egyptian Democratic Party, to become the Egyptian Social Democratic Party on 29 March 2011.

The party built on previous attempts by native anti-colonial activists in the early 20th century to re-assert ethnic Egyptian identity, based in part on national independence from the British and the Ottomans, the establishment of a secular and democratic national government, and the formalization of the local language. It also sought to revive the indigenous Egyptian language and to disassociate Egypt from the Arab nationalist policies introduced by Gamal Abdel Nasser. The Liberal Egyptian Party called for separating religion from politics and most civil affairs. The party also called for capitalism and reducing the influence of the public sector in the economy. In its early history, it called for full normalization with Israel, though this stance was repealed after subsequent alliances with Islamists and leftists.

The co-founders of the Liberal Egyptian party were Mahmoud El Pher'oni, from the Assiut Governorate and Cynthia Farahat, an Egyptian-American author.

== Ideas and goals ==
- The application of a liberal democracy in Egypt.
- Complete secularization and religious neutrality on a political level.
- The reassertion of the Egyptian identity separate from the pan-Arab identity.
- Recognizing Masri (the colloquial language of the Egyptian people) as the official language of Egypt.
- Reviving the Egyptian language.
- Complete religious freedom and protecting the rights of religious minorities to practice their own faith.
- Removing the authority of religious scholars to affect political decisions under the pretext of Sharia law.
- Ensuring that freedom of opinion, expression and belief extends to all members of Egyptian society.

== See also ==
- List of political parties in Egypt
- Liberalism in Egypt
- Politics of Egypt
