= Edmonia Lewis =

American sculptor (1844–1907)

- "Wildfire"
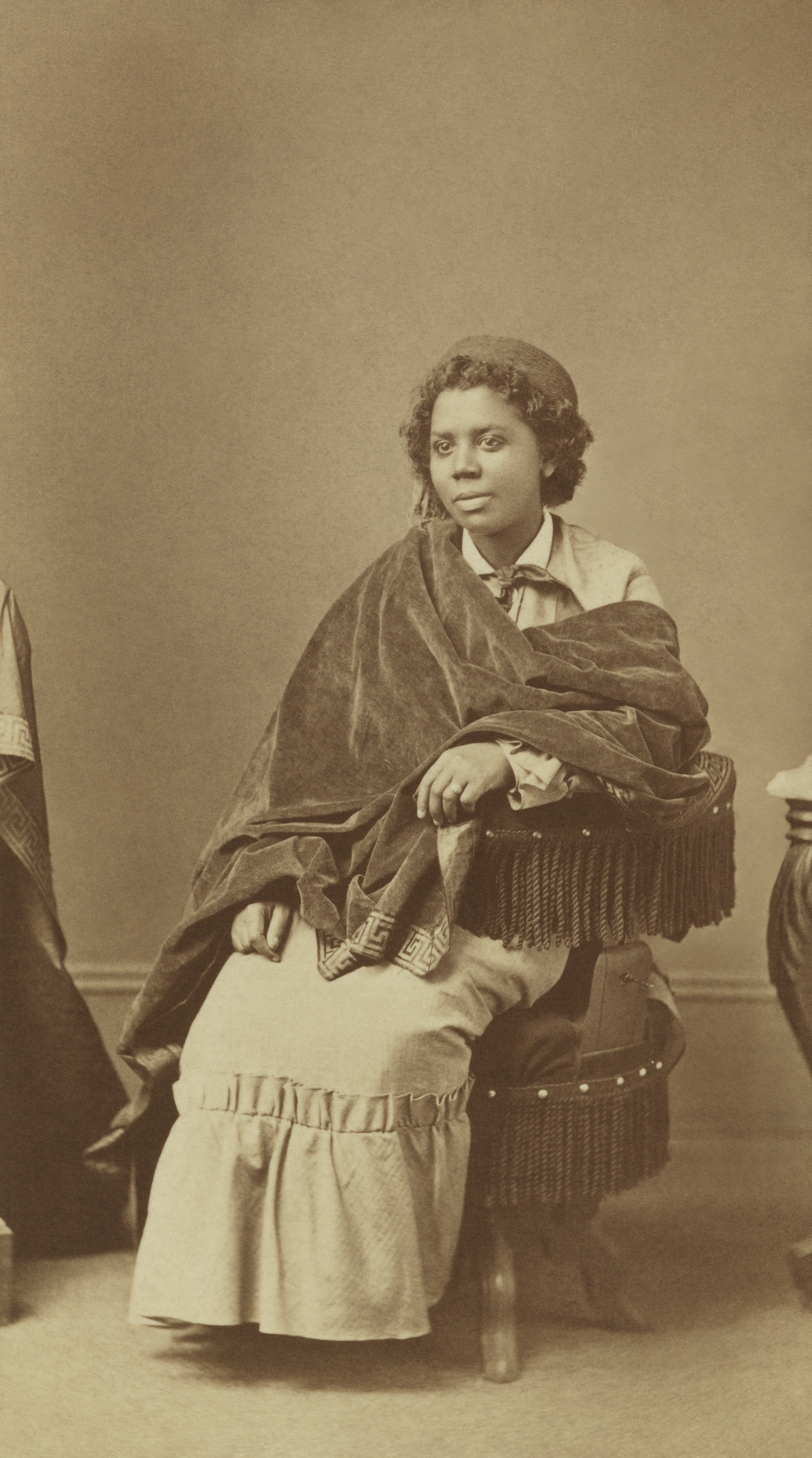
- Lewis, c. 1870
- Born: Mary Edmonia Lewis; July 4, 1844; Town of Greenbush, Rensselaer County, New York, US
- Died: September 17, 1907 (aged 63); London, United Kingdom
- Education: New-York Central College, Oberlin
- Known for: Sculpture
- Movement: Late Neoclassicism
- Patrons: Numerous patrons, American and European

Mary Edmonia Lewis, also known as "Wildfire" (c. July 4, 1844 – September 17, 1907), was an American sculptor. Born in Upstate New York of mixed African-American and Native American (Mississauga Ojibwe) heritage, she moved to Rome, Italy in 1866, where she spent most of her career.

She was the first African-American and Native American sculptor to achieve national and then international prominence. She began to gain prominence in the United States during the Civil War; at the end of the 19th century, she remained the only Black woman artist who had participated in and been recognized to any extent by the American artistic mainstream. In 2002, the scholar Molefi Kete Asante named Edmonia Lewis on his list of 100 Greatest African Americans.

Her work is known for incorporating themes relating to Black people and indigenous peoples of the Americas into Neoclassical-style sculpture.

== Life and career ==
=== Early life ===
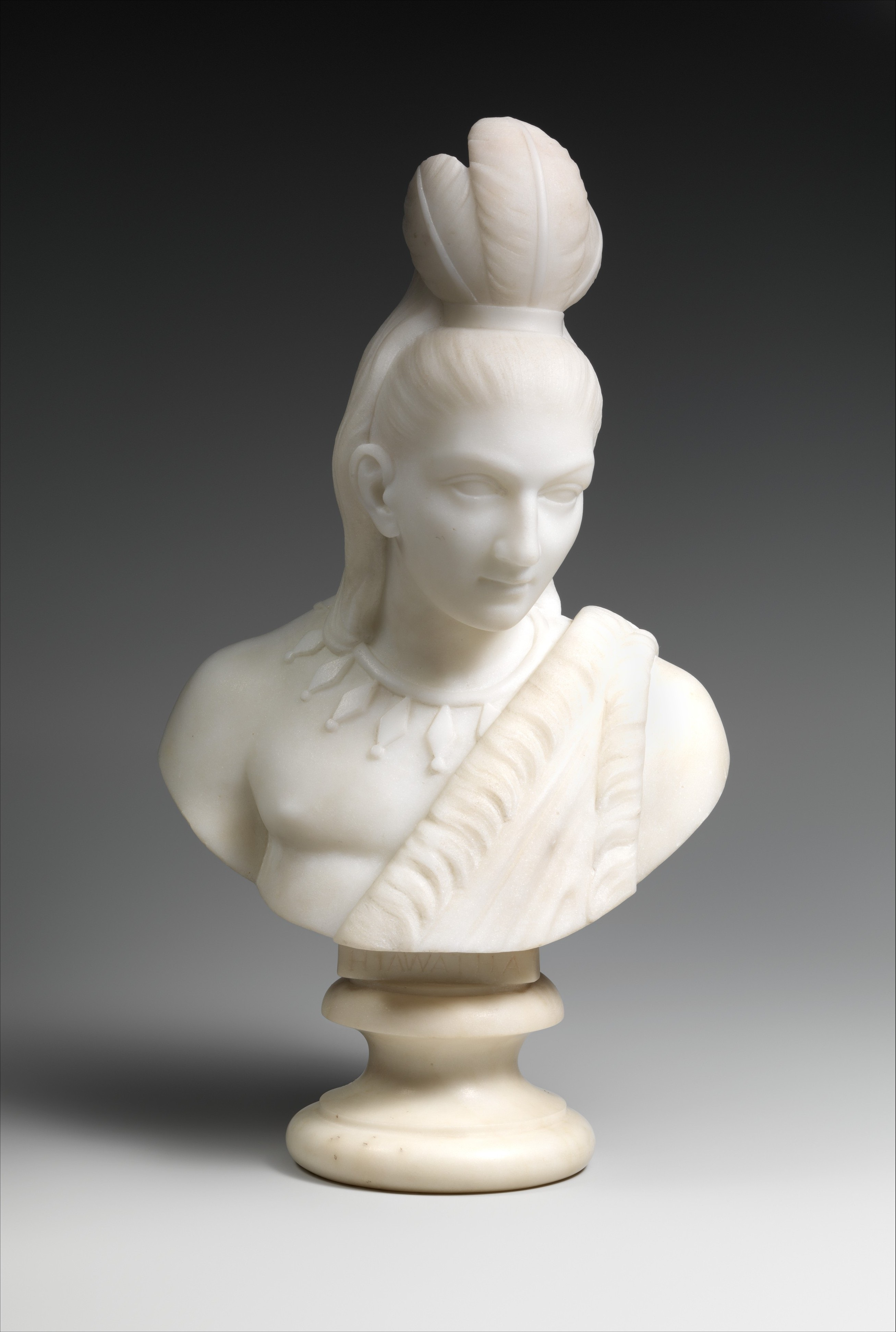
Hiawatha, 1868, by Edmonia Lewis, inspired by Henry Wadsworth Longfellow's 1855 poem The Song of Hiawatha

According to the American National Biography, reliable information about her early life is limited, and Lewis "was often inconsistent in interviews even with basic facts about her origins, preferring to present herself as the exotic product of a childhood spent roaming the forests with her mother's people." On official documents she variously gave 1842, 1844, and 1854 as her birth year. She was born near Albany, New York. Most of her girlhood was apparently spent in Newark, New Jersey.

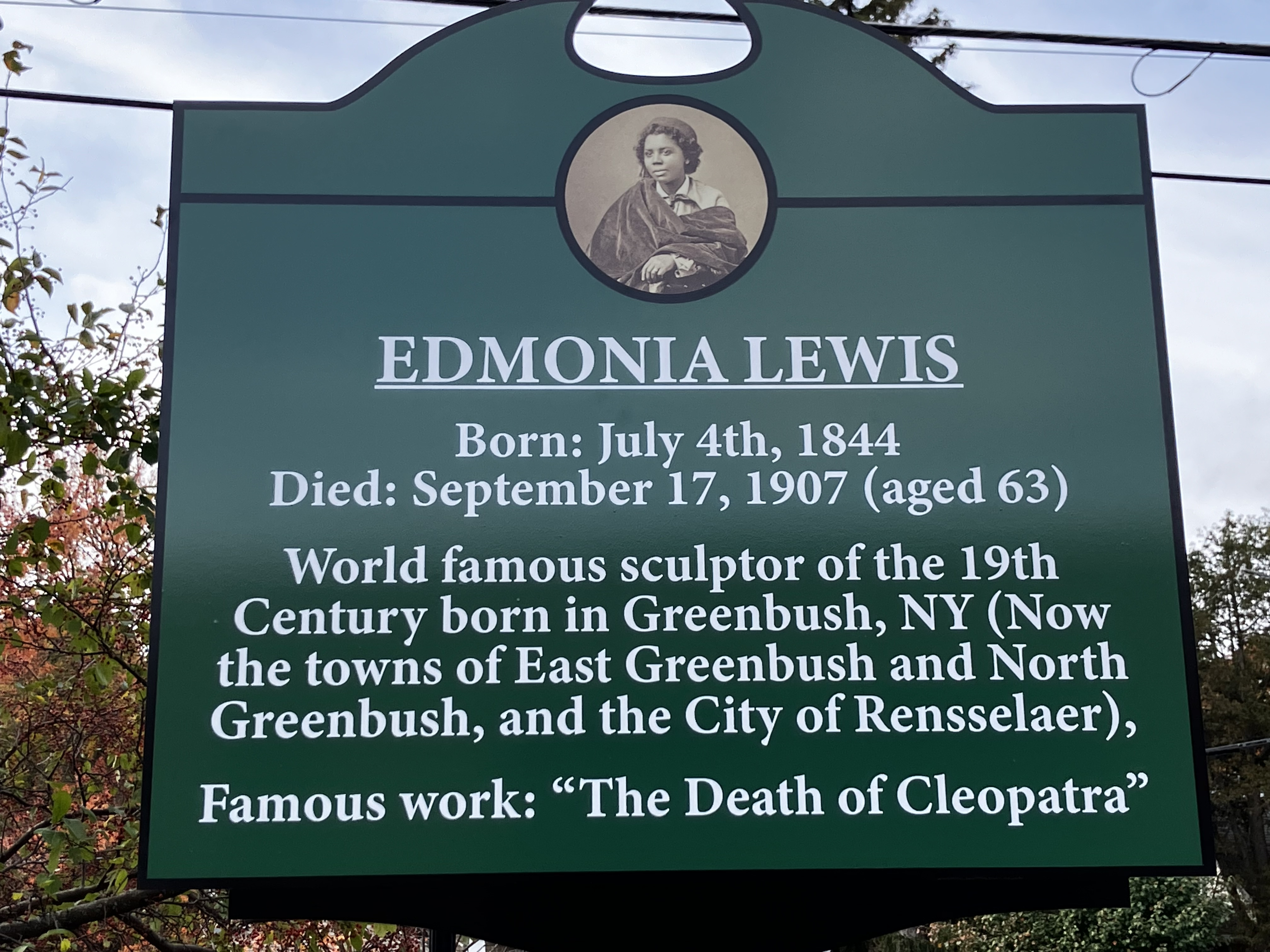
A marker in East Greenbush, New York, noting the local birth of sculptor Edmonia Lewis

Her mother, Catherine Mike Lewis, was African-Native American, of Mississauga Ojibwe and African-American descent. She was an excellent weaver and craftswoman. Two different African-American men are mentioned in different sources as her father. The first is Samuel Lewis, an Afro-Haitian who worked as a valet. Other sources say her father was the writer on African Americans Robert Benjamin Lewis. Her half-brother Samuel, who is treated at some length in a history of Montana, said that their father was "a West Indian Frenchman" and his mother "part African and partly a descendant of the educated Narragansett Indians of New York state". (The Narragansett people are originally from Rhode Island.)

By the time Lewis reached the age of nine, both her parents had died; Catherine Lewis died in 1847 and Robert Benjamin Lewis in 1853. Her two maternal aunts adopted her and her older half-brother Samuel. Samuel was born in Haiti in 1835 to his father of the same name and his first wife. The family came to the United States when Samuel was a young child. Samuel became a barber at the age of 12 after father's death.

The children lived with their aunts near Niagara Falls, New York, for about four years. Lewis and her aunts sold Ojibwe baskets and other items, such as moccasins and embroidered blouses, to tourists visiting Niagara Falls, Toronto, and Buffalo. During this time, Lewis went by her Native American name, Wildfire, while her brother was called Sunshine. In 1852, Samuel left for San Francisco, California, leaving Lewis in the care of a Captain S. R. Mills.

Samuel's endeavors in the California gold rush proved successful, and by the time Edmonia attended college, he "supplied her every want to anticipate her wishes after the style and manner of a person of ample income".

In 1856, Lewis enrolled in a pre-college program at New York Central College, a Baptist abolitionist school in McGrawville (now McGraw, New York). There Lewis met many of the leading activists who would become her mentors, patrons, and possible subjects for her work as her career developed. In a later interview, Lewis explained her early departure from the school:

Until I was twelve years old I led this wandering life, fishing, and swimming...and making moccasins. I was then sent to school for three years in [McGrawville], but was declared to be wild—they could do nothing with me.

However, her academic record at Central College (1856–fall 1858) shows that her grades, "conduct", and attendance were all exemplary. Her classes included Latin, French, grammar, arithmetic, drawing, composition, and declamation.

=== Education ===
In 1859, when Edmonia Lewis was about 15 years old, her brother Samuel, who had made a fortune in the California gold rush, paid for her to be sent her to Oberlin, Ohio, where she attended the secondary Oberlin Academy Preparatory School for the full, three-year course, before entering Oberlin Collegiate Institute (since 1866, Oberlin College), one of the first institutions of higher-learning in the U.S. to admit women and Black people. The Ladies' Department was designed "to give Young Ladies facilities for the thorough mental discipline, and the special training which will qualify them for teaching and other duties of their sphere." She changed her name to Mary Edmonia Lewis and began to study art. At Oberlin, with a student population of one thousand, Lewis was one of only 30 students of color. Lewis boarded with Reverend John Keep and his wife from 1859 until she was forced from the college in 1863. Reverend Keep was white, a member of the college's board of trustees, an avid abolitionist, and a spokesperson for coeducation.

Mary said later that she was subject to daily racism and discrimination. She and other female students, were rarely given the opportunity to participate in the classroom or speak at public meetings.

During the winter of 1862, several months after the start of the US Civil War, an incident occurred between Lewis and two of her roommates and fellow Oberlin classmates, Maria Miles and Christina Ennes. Miles and Ennes planned to go sleigh riding with some young men later that day. Before they left, Lewis served the two girls a drink of spiced wine. Shortly after, several miles into the sleigh ride, Miles and Ennes fell severely ill with intense stomach pains. Doctors examined them and concluded that the two girls had been poisoned (reportedly with cantharides also known as "Spanish Fly", a reputed aphrodisiac) and claimed they were likely to die. However days later, it became apparent that the two women would recover and authorities initially took no action.

News of the controversial incident spread rapidly throughout Ohio and was universally known in the town of Oberlin, where the general population was not as progressive as that of the college. One night while Lewis was walking home alone, she was dragged into an open field by unknown assailants, badly beaten, and left for dead. A few days after the attack, local authorities arrested Lewis, charging her with the poisoning. However, she had been so badly injured in the attack, she could not even walk, and the trial was postponed. Her attackers were never identified.

John Mercer Langston, an Oberlin College alumnus and the first African-American lawyer in Ohio, represented Lewis during her trial. Although most witnesses spoke against her and she did not testify, Chapman moved successfully to have the charges dismissed: the contents of the victims' stomachs had not been analyzed and there was therefore no evidence of poisoning, no corpus delicti.

The remainder of Lewis's time at Oberlin was marked by isolation and prejudice. About a year after the trial, Lewis was accused of stealing artists' materials from the college. The case was, once again, dismissed due to lack of evidence. A few months later, she was charged with aiding and abetting a burglary. At this point, she had left. Another report says that she was forbidden from registering for her last term, leaving her unable to graduate.

Oberlin College awarded her a degree posthumously in 2022.

=== Career in Boston ===
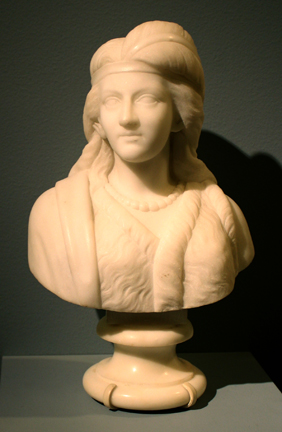
Minnehaha, marble, 1868, collection of the Newark Museum

After college, Lewis moved to Boston, the center of the abolitionist movement, in early 1864, where she began to pursue her career as a sculptor. It was on her first trip to Boston, according to stories she would later tell, that she encountered a statue of Benjamin Franklin, not knowing what it was or what to call it, but concluding she could make a "stone man" herself.

Reverend Keep wrote a letter of introduction on Lewis's behalf to abolitionist William Lloyd Garrison in Boston, as did Henry Highland Garnet. He introduced her to established sculptors in the area, as well as writers who publicized Lewis in the abolitionist press. Finding an instructor, however, was not easy for her. Three male sculptors refused to instruct her before she was introduced to the moderately successful sculptor, Edward Augustus Brackett (1818–1908), who specialized in marble portrait busts. His clients were some of the most important abolitionists of the day, including Henry Wadsworth Longfellow, William Lloyd Garrison, Charles Sumner, and John Brown.

To instruct her, Brackett lent her clay and fragments of sculptures to copy, which he critiqued. Under his tutelage, she crafted her own sculpting tools and sold her first piece, a sculpture of a woman's hand, for $8. Anne Whitney, a fellow sculptor and friend of Lewis', wrote in an 1864 letter to her sister that Lewis's relationship with her instructor did not end amicably, but did not disclose the reason. Lewis opened her studio to the public with her first solo exhibition in 1864.

Her subjects in 1863 and 1864 included some of the most famous abolitionists of her day, including John Brown and Union Colonel Robert Gould Shaw. When she met Shaw, the commander of the first all-Black regiment, the 54th Massachusetts, she was inspired to create a bust of his likeness. It impressed the Shaw family, who purchased it. Lewis then made plaster-cast reproductions of the bust and sold one hundred of these copies at $15 apiece. It was her most famous work at the time; Anna Quincy Waterston, a poet, then wrote a poem about Lewis and Shaw.

Between 1864 to 1871, Lewis was written about or interviewed by Lydia Maria Child, Elizabeth Peabody, Anna Quincy Waterston, and Laura Curtis Bullard, all important women in Boston and New York abolitionist circles. Because of these women, articles about Lewis appeared in many important abolitionist journals, including Broken Fetter, the Christian Register, and the Independent. Lewis was aware of her reception in Boston. She was not opposed to the coverage she received in the abolitionist press, and she was not known to turn down financial assistance, but she could not tolerate false praise. She knew that some did not really appreciate her art, but used her as an opportunity to demonstrate their support for human rights.

Early works that proved highly popular included her medallion portraits of the abolitionists John Brown, described as "her hero", and William Lloyd Garrison. Lewis also drew inspiration from Henry Wadsworth Longfellow and his work, particularly his epic poem The Song of Hiawatha. She made several busts of its leading characters, for whom Longfellow had drawn on Ojibwe legend.

=== Career in Rome ===
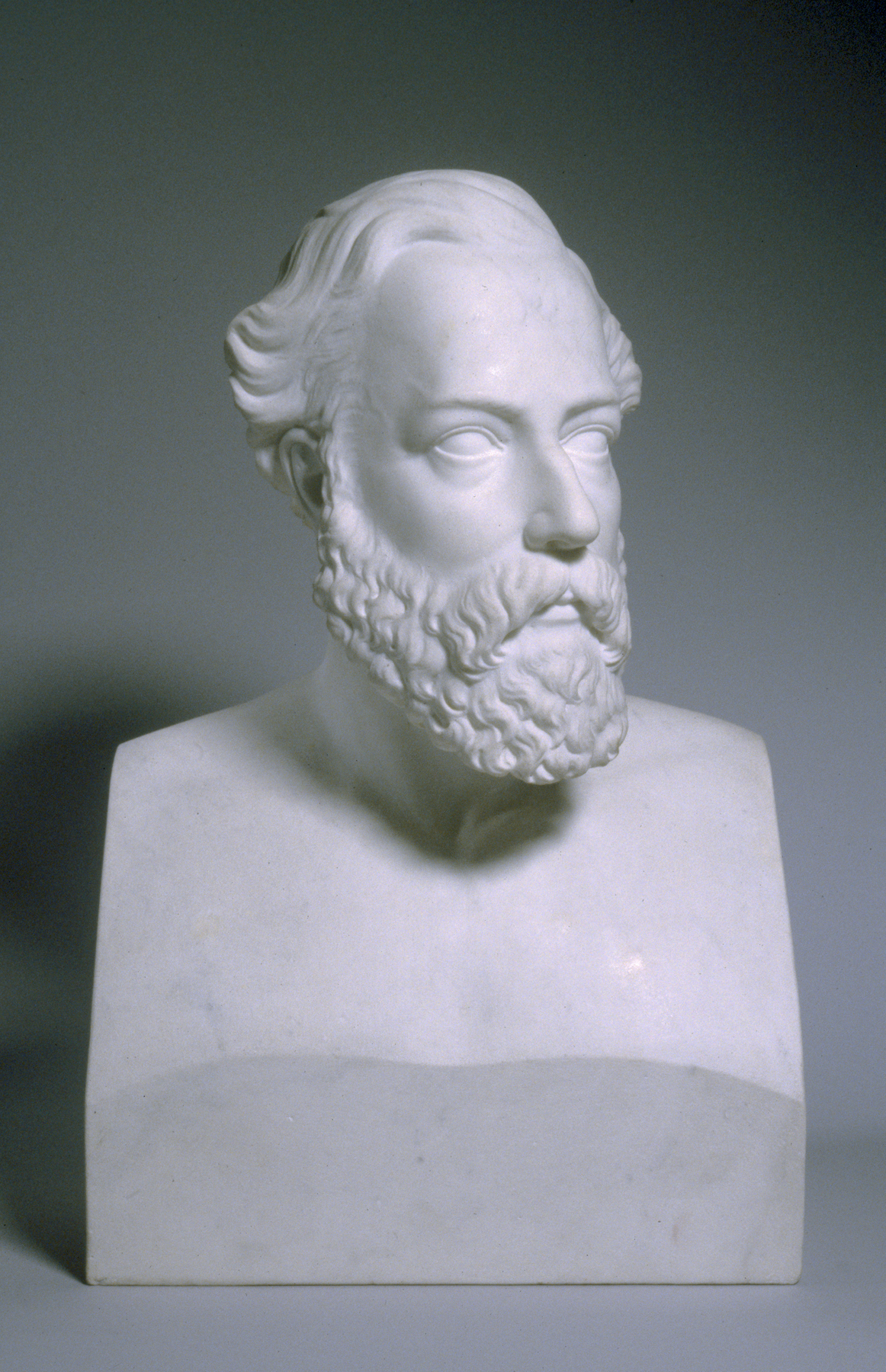
While in Rome, Lewis adopted the neoclassical style of sculpture, as seen in Bust of Dr. Dio Lewis (1868).

I was practically driven to Rome in order to obtain the opportunities for art culture, and to find a social atmosphere where I was not constantly reminded of my color. The land of liberty had no room for a colored sculptor.

The success and popularity of the works she created in Boston, particularly the reproductions of her bust of Shaw, allowed Lewis to finance a trip to Rome in 1866. On her 1865 passport is written, "M. Edmonia Lewis is a Black girl sent by subscription to Italy having displayed great talents as a sculptor". The established sculptor Hiram Powers gave her space to work in his studio. She entered a circle of expatriate artists and established her own space within the former studio of 18th-century Italian sculptor Antonio Canova, just off the Piazza Barberini. She received professional support from both Charlotte Cushman, a Boston actress and a pivotal figure for expatriate sculptors in Rome, and Maria Weston Chapman, a dedicated worker for the anti-slavery cause.

Lewis spent most of her adult career in Rome, where Italy's less pronounced racism allowed a black artist increased opportunity. There Lewis enjoyed more social, spiritual, and artistic freedom than she had had in the United States. She was Catholic and Rome allowed her both spiritual and physical closeness to her faith. In America, Lewis would have had to continue relying on abolitionist patronage; but Italy allowed her to make her own in the international art world. She began sculpting in marble, working within the neoclassical manner, but focusing on naturalism within themes and images relating to black and American Indian people. The surroundings of the classical world greatly inspired her and influenced her work, in which she recreated the classical art style—such as presenting people in her sculptures draped in robes rather than in contemporary clothing.

She wears a red cap in her studio, which is very picturesque and effective; her face is a bright, intelligent, and expressive one. Her manners are child-like, simple and most winning and pleasing.... There is something in human nature...which makes everyone admire a brave and heroic spirit; and if people are not always ready to lend a helping hand to struggling genius, they are all eager to applaud when those struggles are crowned with success. The hour of applause has come to Edmonia Lewis.

Lewis was unique in the way she approached sculpting abroad. She insisted on enlarging her clay and wax models in marble herself, rather than hire native Italian sculptors to do it for her – the common practice at the time. Male sculptors were largely skeptical of the talent of female sculptors, and often accused them of not doing their own work. Harriet Hosmer, a fellow sculptor and expatriate, also did this. Lewis also made sculptures before receiving commissions for them or sent unsolicited works to Boston patrons requesting that they raise funds for materials and shipping.

While in Rome, Lewis continued to express her African-American and Native American heritage. One of her more famous works, Forever Free, depicted a powerful image of an African-American man and woman emerging from the bonds of slavery. Another sculpture Lewis created was called The Arrow Maker, which showed a Native American father teaching his daughter how to make an arrow.

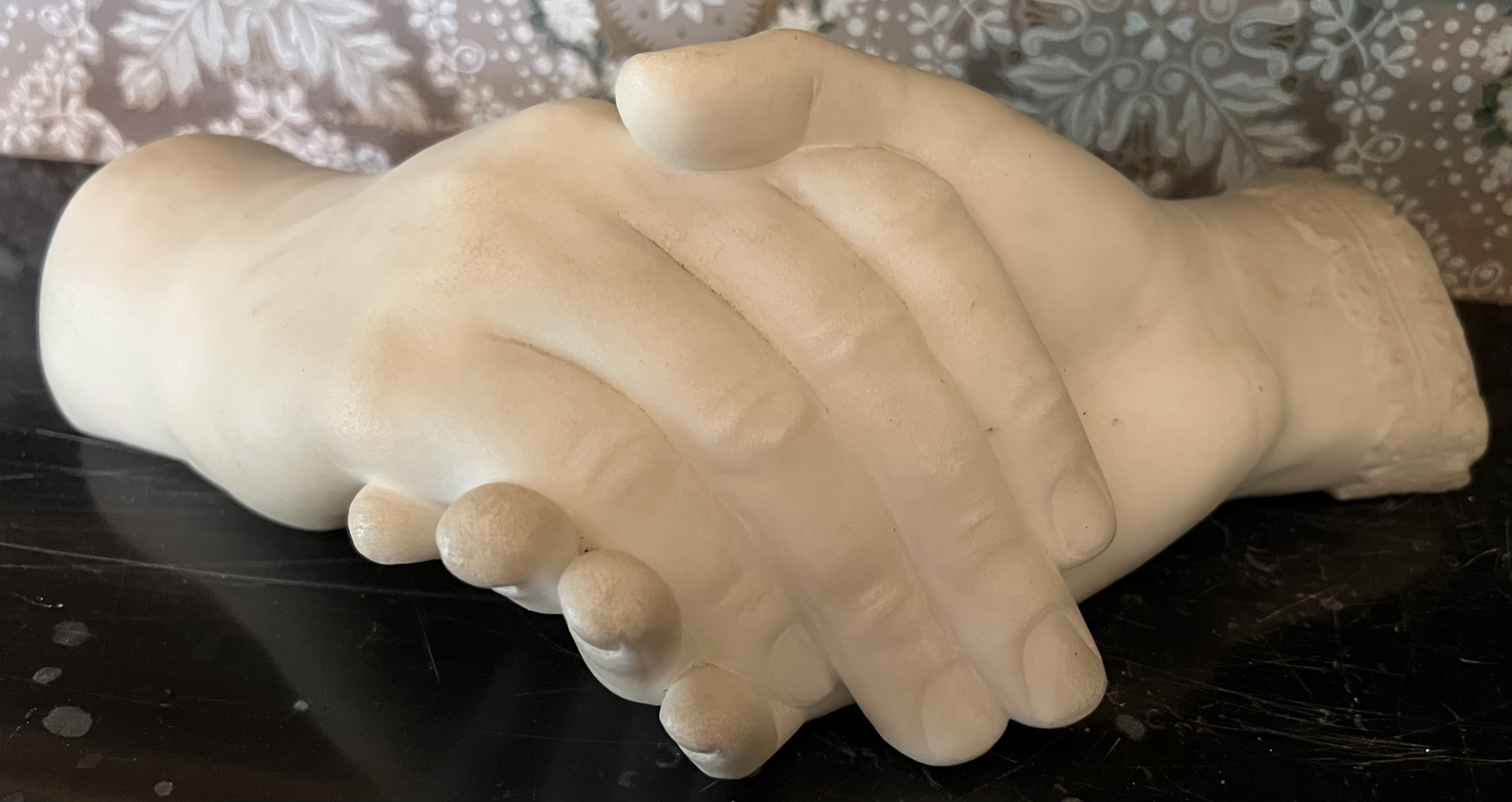
Edmonia Lewis, hands of Gerrit Smith and his wife Ann Carroll Fitzhugh

Her work sold for large sums of money. In 1873 an article in the New Orleans Picayune stated: "Edmonia Lewis had snared two 50,000-dollar commissions". Her new-found popularity made her studio a tourist destination. Lewis had many major exhibitions during her rise to fame, including one in Chicago, Illinois, in 1870, and another in Rome in 1871.

=== Later career ===
In 1872, Edmonia was summoned to Peterboro, New York, to sculpt wealthy abolitionist Gerrit Smith, a project conceived by his friends. Smith was not pleased and what Lewis completed was a sculpture of the clasped hands of Gerrit and his beloved wife Ann. A major coup in her career was participating in the 1876 Centennial Exposition in Philadelphia. For this, she created a monumental 3,015-pound marble sculpture, The Death of Cleopatra, portraying the queen in the throes of death, which was her largest and most significant sculpture.

A testament to Lewis's renown as an artist came in 1877, when former U.S. President Ulysses S. Grant commissioned her to do his portrait. He sat for her as a model and was pleased with the finished piece. She also contributed a bust of Massachusetts abolitionist Senator Charles Sumner to the 1895 Atlanta Exposition.

In the late 1880s, neoclassicism declined in popularity, as did the popularity of Lewis's artwork. She continued sculpting in marble, increasingly creating altarpieces and other works for Catholic patrons. A bust of Christ, created in her Rome studio in 1870, was rediscovered in Scotland in 2015. In the art world, Lewis was eclipsed by new styles and lost recognition. By 1901 she had moved to London. (Note: The 1901 British census lists her as lodging at 37 Store Street, Holborn, supported by "own means". She gives her age as 59, her occupation as "Artist (modeller)", and her birthplace as "India".)

The events of her later years are not known.

== Death ==
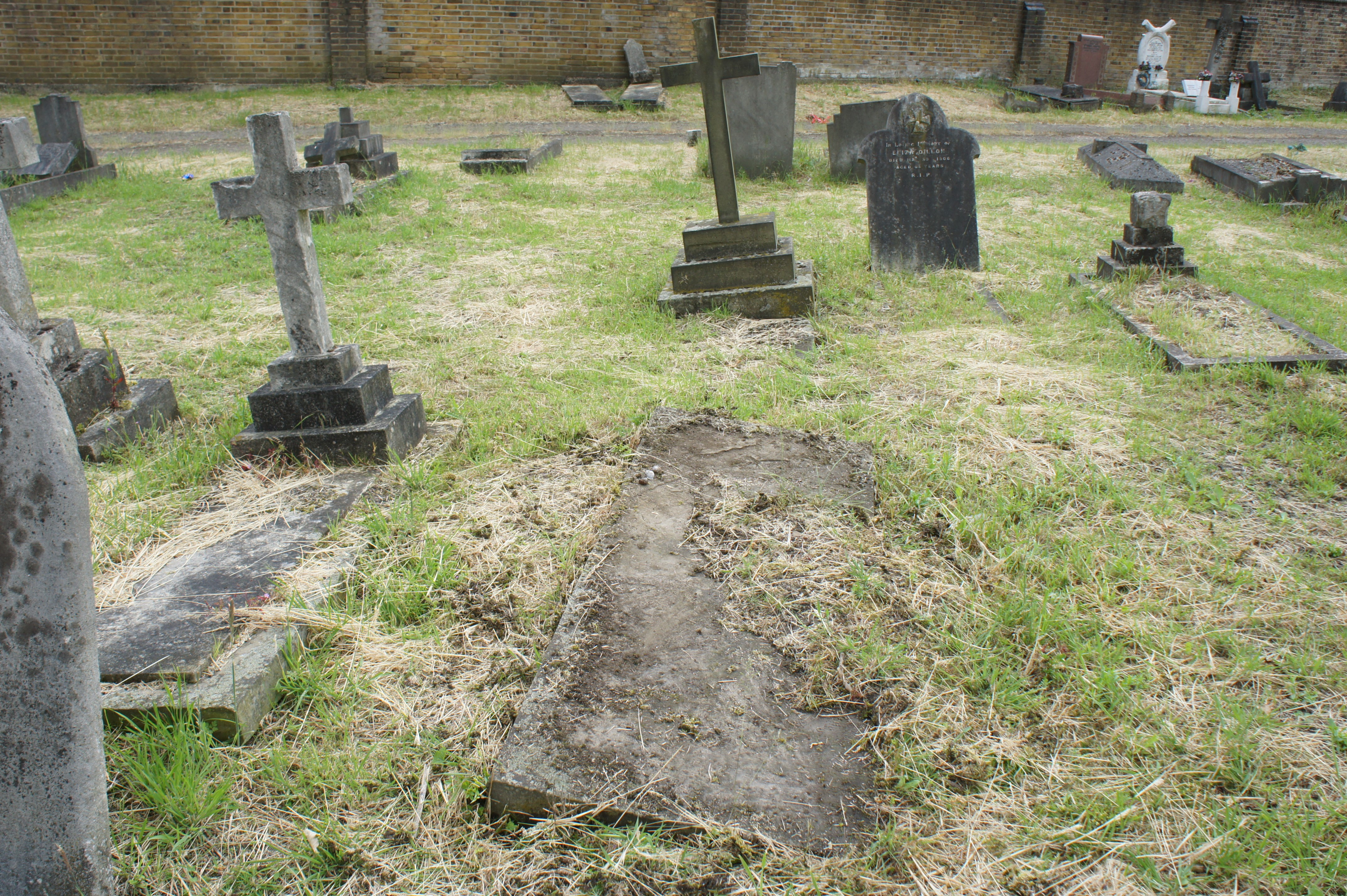
Lewis's grave in St. Mary's Roman Catholic Cemetery, Kensal Green, London

From 1896 to 1901, Lewis lived in Paris. She then relocated to the Hammersmith area of London before her death on September 17, 1907, in the Hammersmith Borough Infirmary, age 63. According to her death certificate, the cause of her death was chronic kidney failure (Bright's disease). She is buried in St. Mary's Catholic Cemetery, in Kensal Green, London.

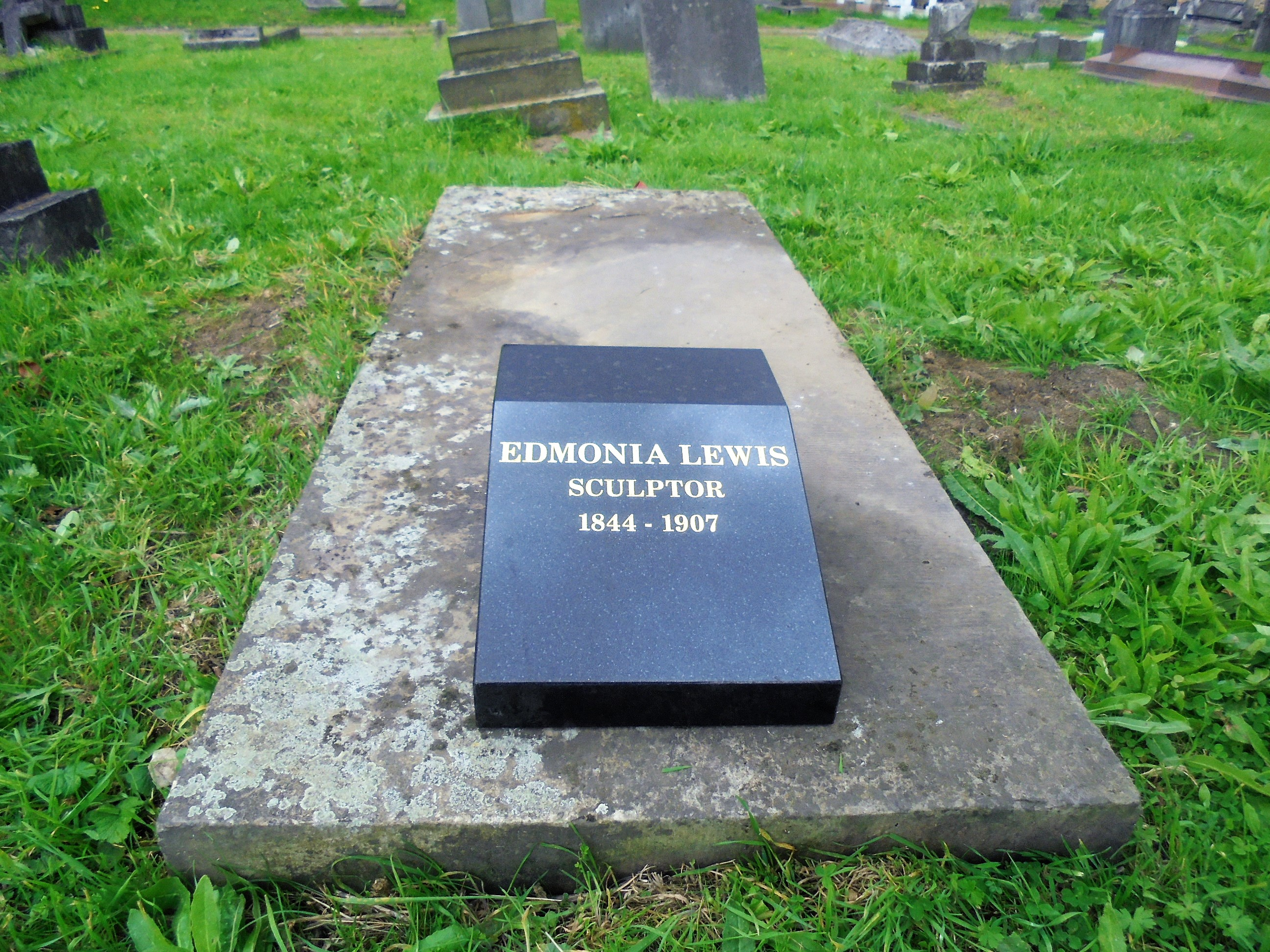
Edmonia Lewis's grave after restoration

For many years after her death, the location of Lewis' grave was unknown. There were once theories that Lewis died in Rome in 1907 or, alternatively, that she had died in Marin County, California, and was buried in an unmarked grave in San Francisco. Her true resting place was discovered after a decades long search by former MIT professor Marilyn Richardson, and in 2017, a GoFundMe by Bobbie Reno, town historian of East Greenbush, New York, was successful, and Edmonia Lewis's grave was restored. The work was done by the E. M. Lander Co. in London.

== Reception ==
As a black artist, Edmonia Lewis had to be conscious of her stylistic choices, as her largely white audience often gravely misread her work as self-portraiture. In order to avoid this, her female figures typically possess European features. Lewis had to balance her own personal identity with her artistic, social, and national identity, a tiring activity that affected her art.

In her 2007 work, Charmaine Nelson wrote of Lewis:

It is hard to overstate the visual incongruity of the black-Native female body, let alone that identity in a sculptor, within the Roman colony. As the first black-Native sculptor of either sex to achieve international recognition within a western sculptural tradition, Lewis was a symbolic and social anomaly within a dominantly white bourgeois and aristocratic community.

== Personal life ==
Lewis never married and had no known children. According to her biographer, Dr. Marilyn Richardson, there is no definite information about her romantic involvement with anyone. However, in 1873 her engagement was announced, and in 1875, her fiancé's skin color was revealed to be the same as hers, although his name is not given. There is no further reference to this engagement.

== Popular works ==
=== Old Arrow-Maker and his Daughter (1866) ===
This sculpture was inspired by Lewis's Native American heritage. An arrow-maker and his daughter sit on a round base, dressed in traditional Native American clothes. The male figure has recognizable Native American facial features, but not the daughter. As white audiences misread her work as self-portraiture, she often removed all facial features associated with "colored" races in female portrayal. This statue later came to be known as The Wooing of Hiawatha, since it appears to depict a scene from Longfellow's epic poem where Minnehaha and her father are approached by Hiawatha. This perspective of the scene (not of a third-person view of everyone, but rather a first-person view from Hiawatha's perspective) is particularly notable because it seems to come from Lewis's first-person insight into the character of a Native American and thus invites viewers to share this perspective. This piece is in the collection of the North Carolina Museum of Art.

=== Forever Free (1867) ===
Forever Free
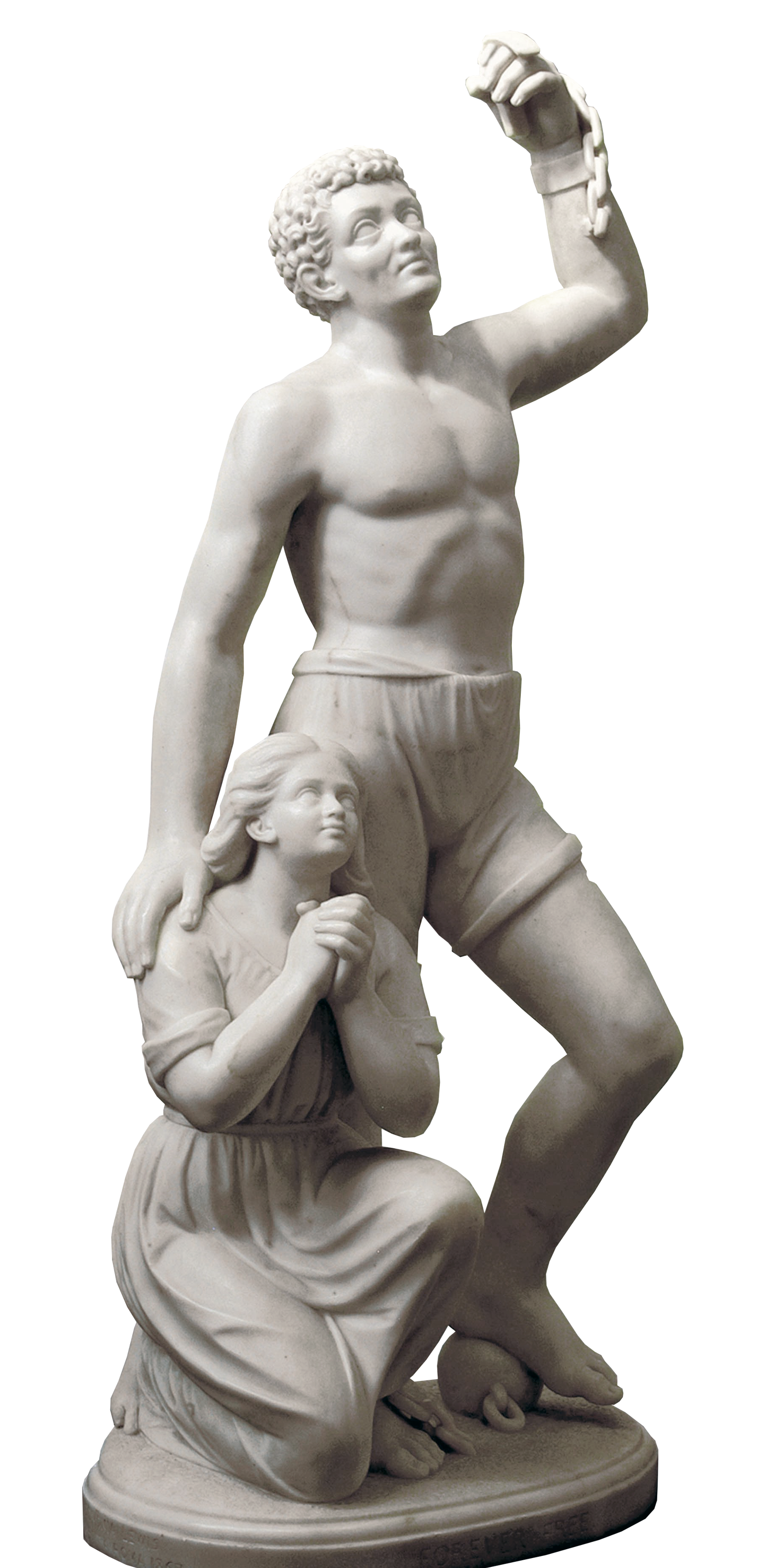
- Artist: Edmonia Lewis
- Year: 1867

Forever Free is a sculpture Lewis created in 1867, commemorating the abolition of slavery in the United States two years earlier and takes its title from President Lincoln's Emancipation Proclamation. The white marble sculpture shows a man standing, staring up, and raising his left arm into the air. Wrapped around his left wrist is a chain; however, this chain is not restraining him. To his right is a woman kneeling with her hands held in a position of prayer, the man's right hand gently placed on her right shoulder. The work differs from many other depictions of abolition from the period by showing the Black man standing and unshackled rather than bound or kneeling.

Scholars have frequently puzzled over Lewis's decision to Europeanize the features of the female figure. At least one scholar has suggested that the choice may have been an acknowledgment of the varied appearance and heritage of African Americans such as Lewis herself, who was of both African and Native American descent.

This piece is held by Howard University Gallery of Art in Washington, D.C.

=== Hagar (1875) ===
Lewis had a tendency to sculpt historically strong women, as demonstrated not just in Hagar but also in Lewis's Cleopatra piece. Lewis also depicted ordinary women in extreme situations, emphasizing their strength. Hagar is inspired by a character from the Old Testament, the handmaid or slave of Abraham's wife Sarah. Being unable to conceive a child, Sarah gave Hagar to Abraham, in order to bear him a son. Hagar gave birth to Abraham's firstborn son Ishmael, and after Sarah gave birth to her own son Isaac, she resented Hagar and made Abraham "cast her into the wilderness". The piece was made of white marble, and Hagar is standing as if about to walk on, with her hands clasped in prayer and staring slightly up but not straight across. Some scholars interpret Hagar as a metaphor for the struggles of African-American women, particularly in the context of slavery and exploitation.

=== The Death of Cleopatra (1876) ===
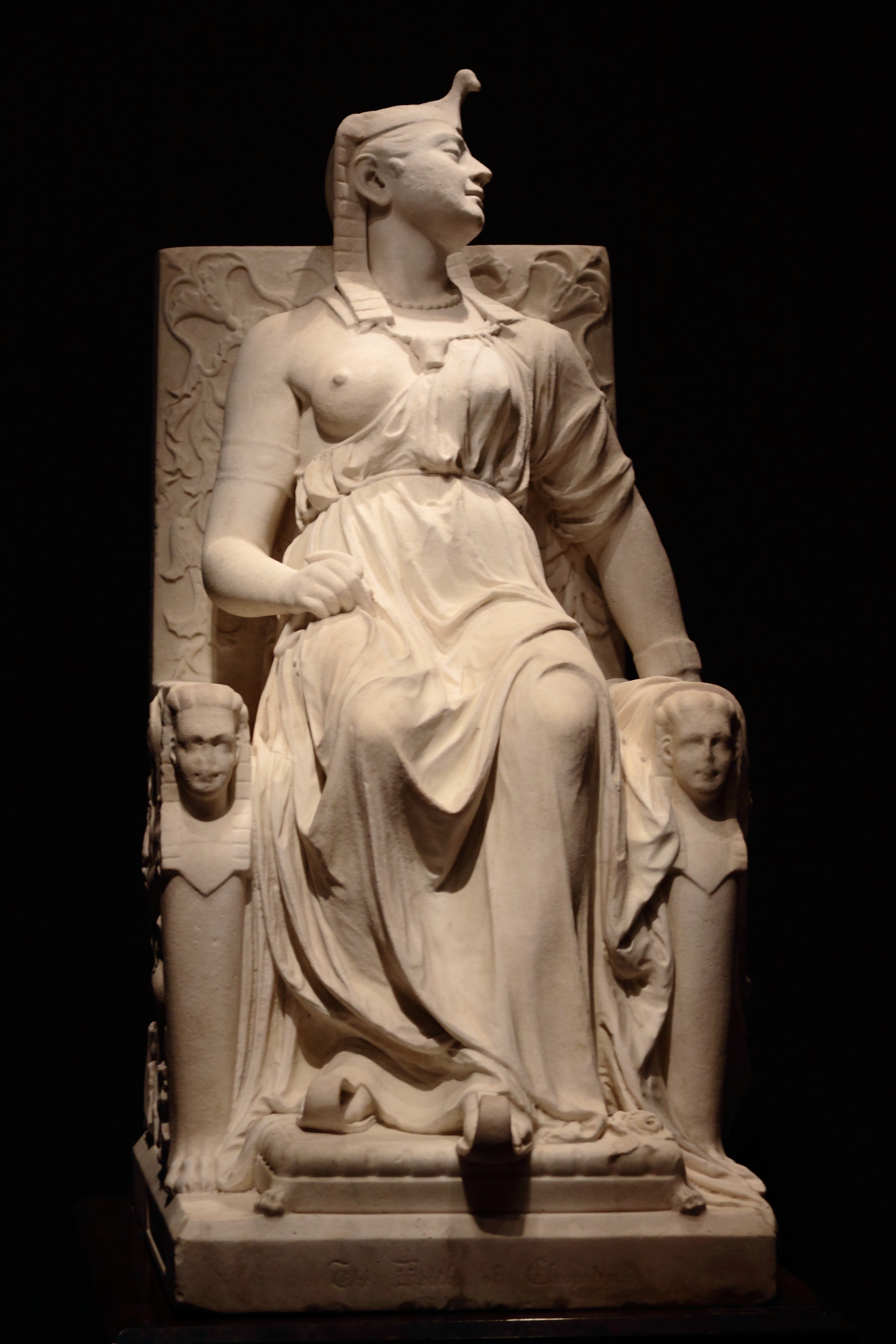
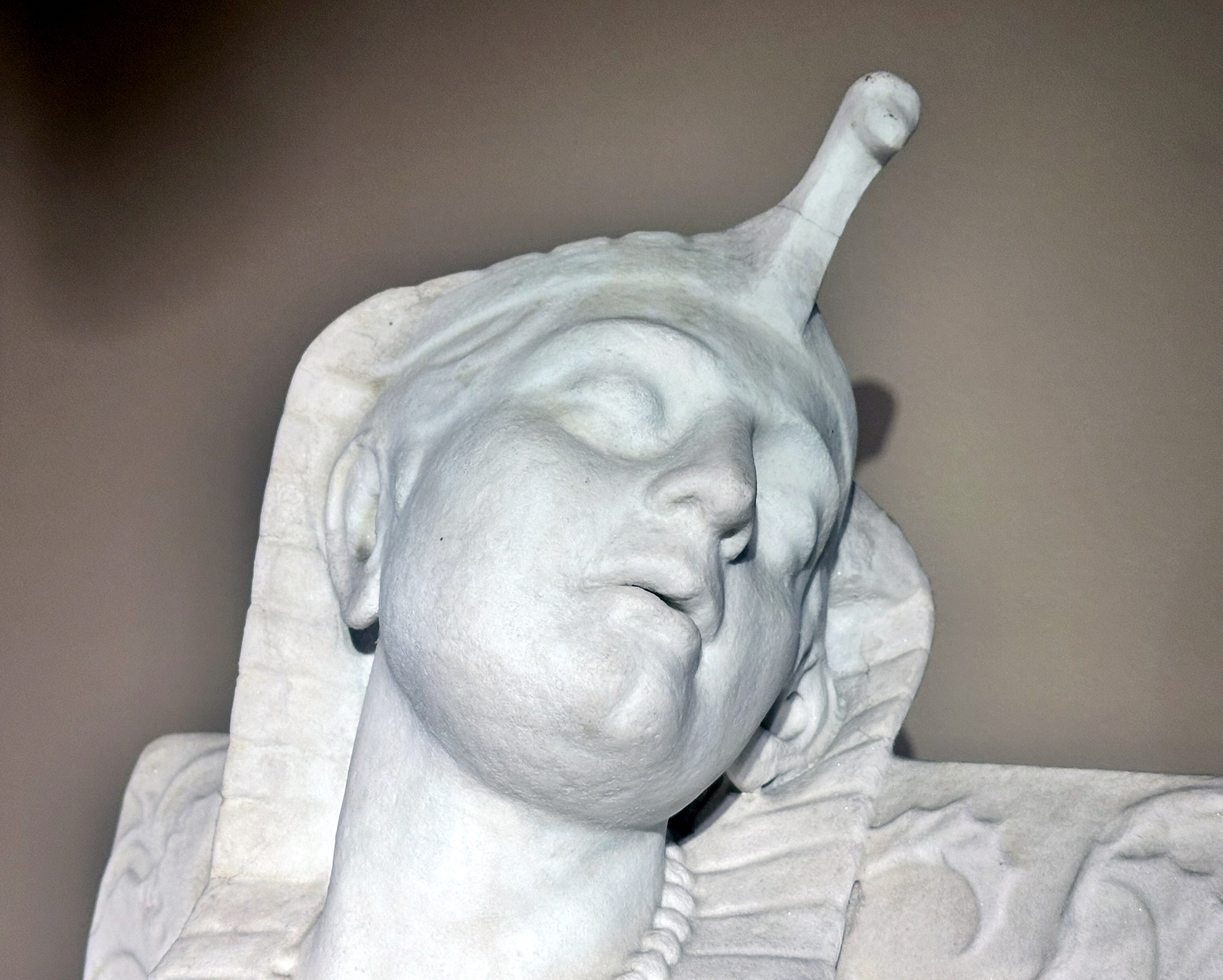
The Death of Cleopatra, marble, 1876, collection of the Smithsonian American Art Museum

The Death of Cleopatra depicts the moment popularized by Shakespeare in Antony and Cleopatra, in which Cleopatra had allowed herself to be bitten by a poisonous asp following the loss of her crown. When it was displayed in the 1876 Centennial Exposition in Philadelphia, J. S. Ingraham wrote that Cleopatra was "the most remarkable piece of sculpture in the American section" of the Exposition. Much of the viewing public was shocked by Lewis's frank portrayal of death, but the statue drew thousands of viewers nonetheless. Cleopatra was considered a woman of both sensuous beauty and demonic power, and her self-annihilation has been repeatedly portrayed in art, literature and cinema. In Death of Cleopatra, Edmonia Lewis added an innovative flair by portraying the Egyptian queen in a disheveled, inelegant manner, a departure from the refined, composed Victorian approach to representing death.

Considering Lewis's interest in emancipation imagery as seen in her work Forever Free, it is not surprising that Lewis eliminated Cleopatra's usual companion figures of loyal slaves from her work. Lewis's The Death of Cleopatra may have been a response to the culture of the Centennial Exposition, which celebrated one hundred years of the United States being built around the principles of liberty and freedom, a celebration of unity despite centuries of slavery, the recent Civil War, and the failing attempts and efforts of Reconstruction. To avoid any acknowledgment of black empowerment by the Centennial, Lewis's sculpture could not have directly addressed the subject of Emancipation. Although her white contemporaries were also sculpting Cleopatra and other comparable subject matter (such as Harriet Hosmer's Zenobia), Lewis was more prone to scrutiny on the premise of race and gender since she, like Cleopatra, was female:

The associations between Cleopatra and a black Africa were so profound that...any depiction of the ancient Egyptian queen had to contend with the issue of her race and the potential expectation of her blackness. Lewis's white queen gained the aura of historical accuracy through primary research without sacrificing its symbolic links to abolitionism, black Africa, or the black diaspora. But what it refused to facilitate was the racial objectification of the artist's body. Lewis could not so readily become the subject of her representation if her subject was corporeally white.

After being placed in storage, the statue was moved to the 1878 Chicago Interstate Exposition. It was later acquired by a gambler by the name of "Blind John" Condon, who purchased it from a saloon on Clark Street to mark the grave of a racehorse named "Cleopatra", which was located in the Chicago suburb of Forest Park. It remained for nearly a century. The sculpture was moved to a construction storage yard in Cicero, Illinois. Academic and Lewis biographer Marilyn Richardson and bibliographer Dorothy Porter Wesley later played an instrumental role in bringing the long-neglected sculpture to the attention of the National Museum of American Art curator George Gurney. Through their advocacy the sculpture was donated by the Forest Park Historical Society to the Smithsonian American Art Museum in 1994.

== In popular media ==
- Namesake of the Edmonia Lewis Center for Women and Transgender People at Oberlin College.
- Written about in Olio, which is a book of poetry written by Tyehimba Jess that was released in 2016. That book won the 2017 Pulitzer Prize for Poetry.
- Honored with a Google Doodle on February 1, 2017.
- Stone Mirrors: The Sculpture and Silence of Edmonia Lewis, by Jeannine Atkins (2017), is a juvenile biographical novel in verse.
- A belated obituary was published in The New York Times in 2018 as part of their Overlooked series.
- Lewis is the subject of a stage play entitled Edmonia by Barry M. Putt Jr., presented by Beacon Theatre Productions in Philadelphia, PA in 2021. "Edmonia" stage play.
- Lewis had a U.S. postal stamp unveiled in her honor on January 26, 2022.

== List of major works ==
- John Brown medallions, 1864–65
- Colonel Robert Gould Shaw (plaster), 1864
- Anne Quincy Waterston, 1866
- A Freed Woman and Her Child, 1866
- The Old Arrow-Maker and His Daughter, 1866
- The Marriage of Hiawatha, 1866–67
- Forever Free, 1867
- Colonel Robert Gould Shaw (marble), 1867–68
- Hagar in the Wilderness, 1868
- Madonna Holding the Christ Child, 1869
- Hiawatha, collection of the Metropolitan Museum of Art, 1868 (Note: The Newark Museum lists the date of the sculpture as 1868; however, Wolfe 1998, p. 120 gives the dates 1869–71.)
- Minnehaha, collection of the Metropolitan Museum of Art, 1868
- Indian Combat, Carrara marble, 30" high, collection of the Cleveland Museum of Art, 1868
- Henry Wadsworth Longfellow, 1869–71
- Bust of Abraham Lincoln, 1870 (Note: The original sculpture is housed in the California Room of San José Public Library. The statues Awake (1872), Asleep (1872), and Bust of Abraham Lincoln (1870) were purchased in 1873 by the San Jose Library Association (forerunner to the San Jose Public Library) and transferred to the San Jose Public Library.)22,
- Asleep, 1872
- Awake, 1872
- Poor Cupid, 1873
- Moses, 1873
- Bust of James Peck Thomas, 1874, collection of the Allen Memorial Art Museum, her only known portrait of a freed slave
- Hygieia, 1874
- Hagar, 1875
- The Death of Cleopatra, marble, 1876, collection of Smithsonian American Art Museum
- John Brown, 1876, Rome, plaster bust
- Henry Wadsworth Longfellow, 1876, Rome, plaster bust
- General Ulysses S. Grant, 1877–78
- Veiled Bride of Spring, 1878
- John Brown, 1878–79
- The Adoration of the Magi, 1883
- Charles Sumner, 1895

== Gallery ==
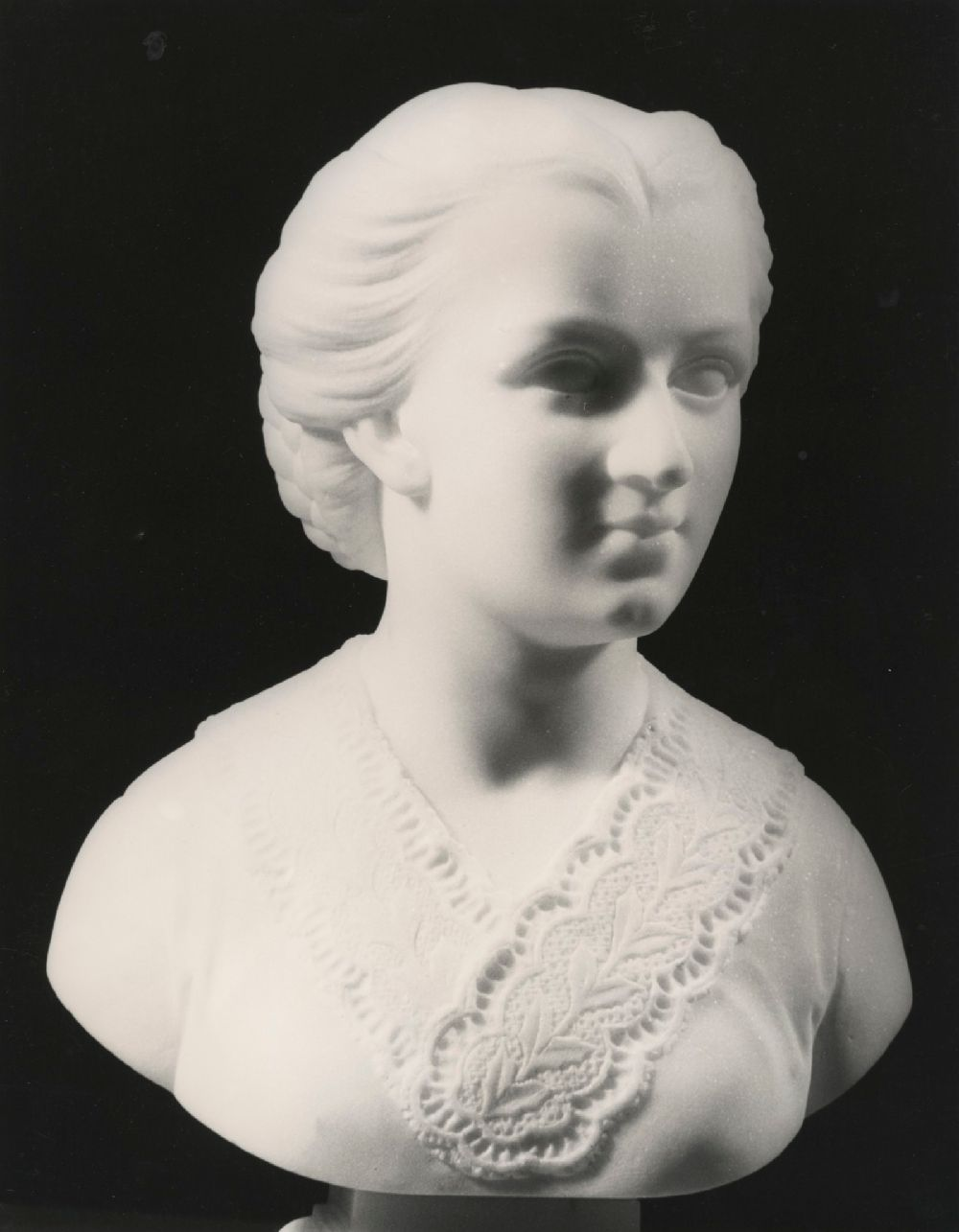
Edmonia Lewis, Anna Quincy Waterston, 1866, photo by David Finn, ©David Finn Archive, Department of Image Collections, National Gallery of Art Library, Washington, DC

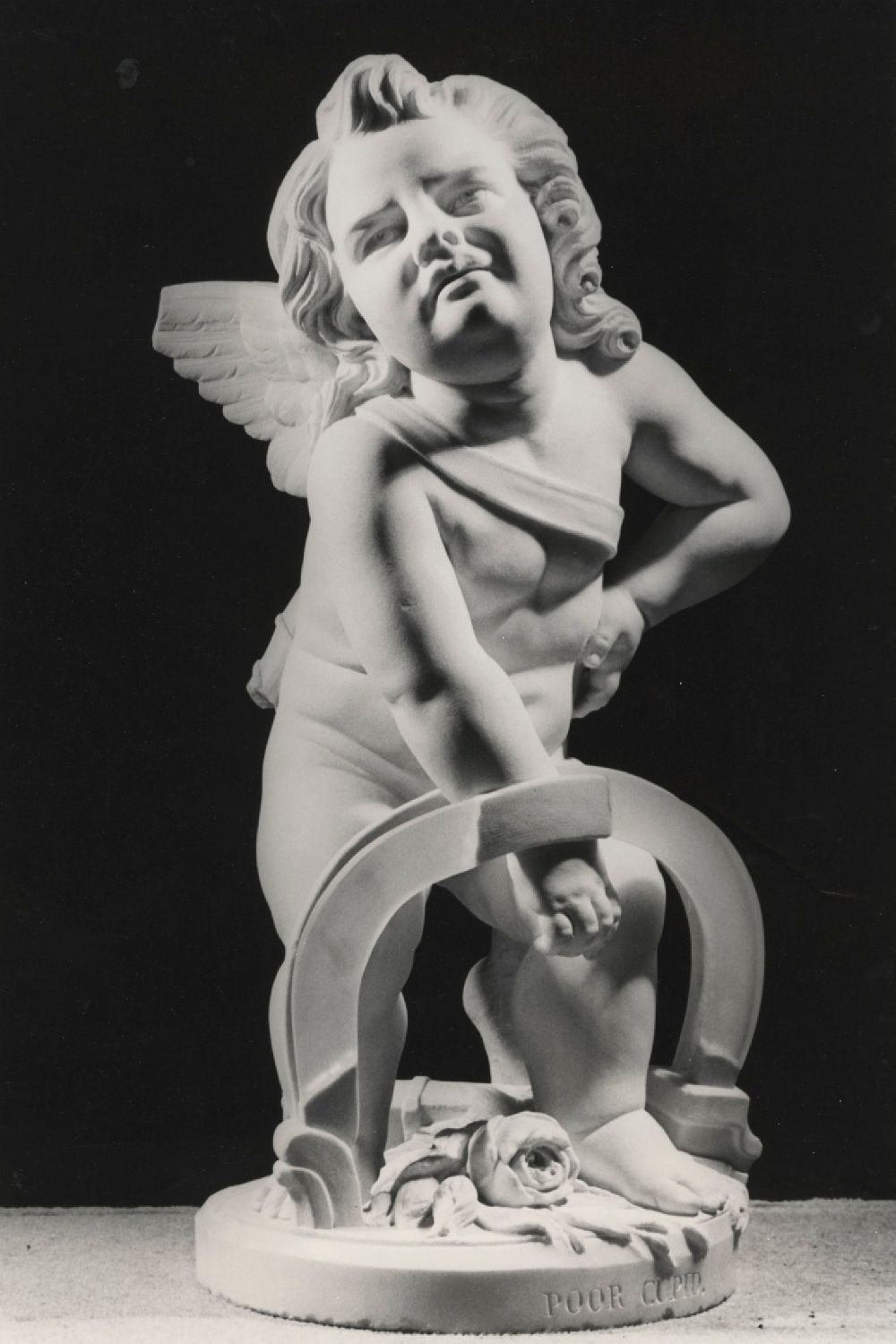
Edmonia Lewis, Poor Cupid, 1872–1876, photo by David Finn, ©David Finn Archive, Department of Image Collections, National Gallery of Art Library, Washington, DC

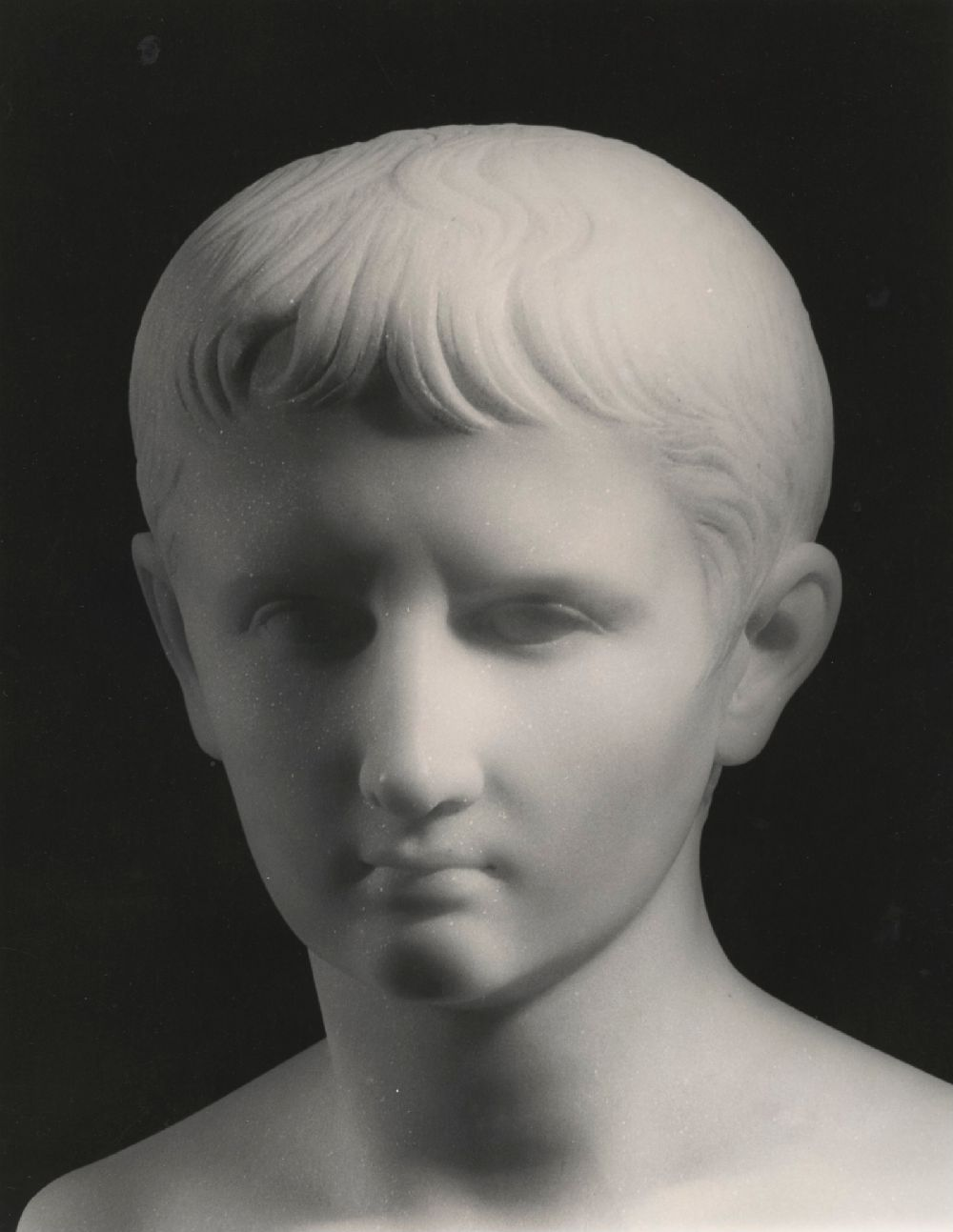
Edmonia Lewis, Young Octavian, 1873, photo by David Finn, ©David Finn Archive, Department of Image Collections, National Gallery of Art Library, Washington, DC

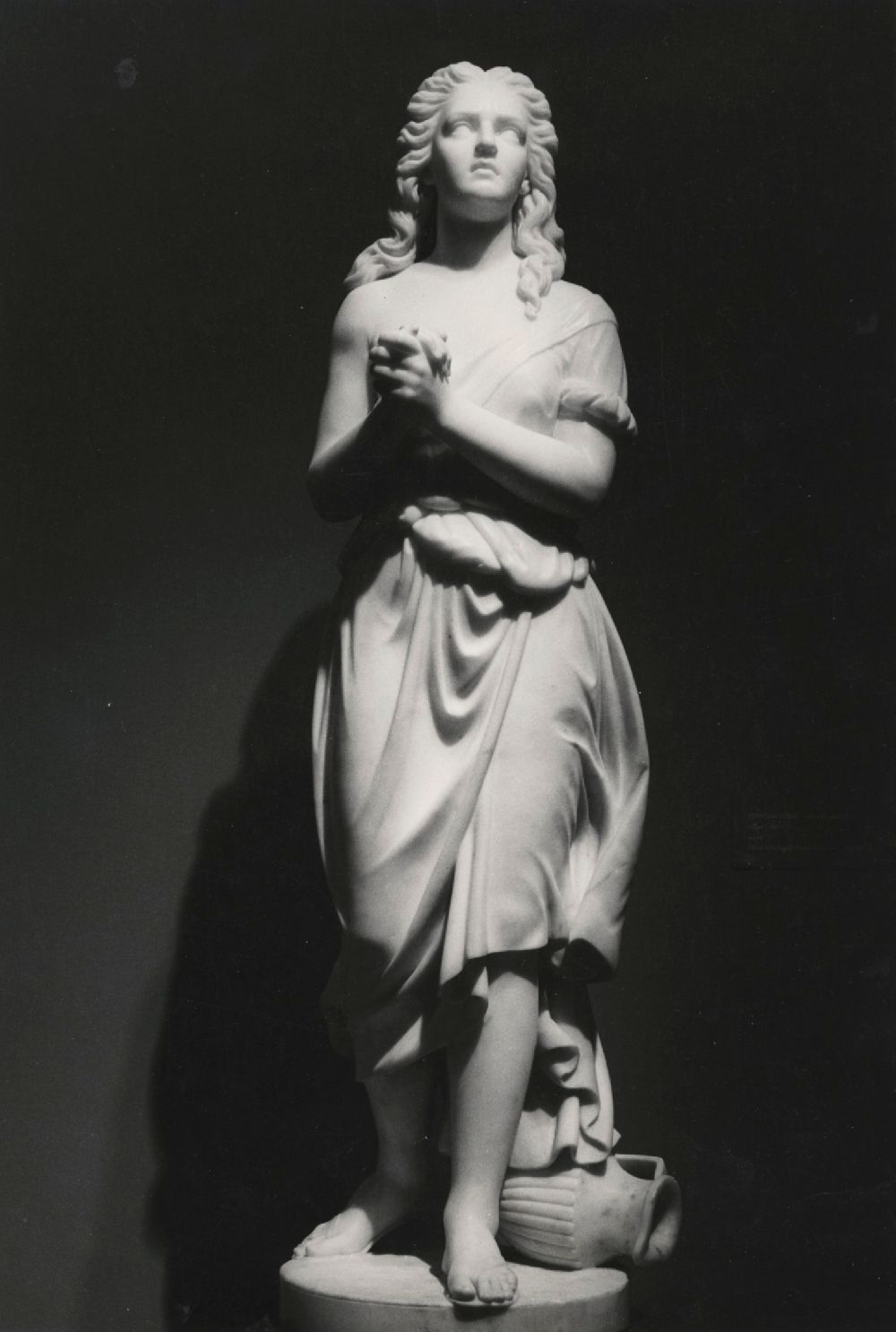
Edmonia Lewis, Hagar, 1875, photo by David Finn, ©David Finn Archive, Department of Image Collections, National Gallery of Art Library, Washington, DC

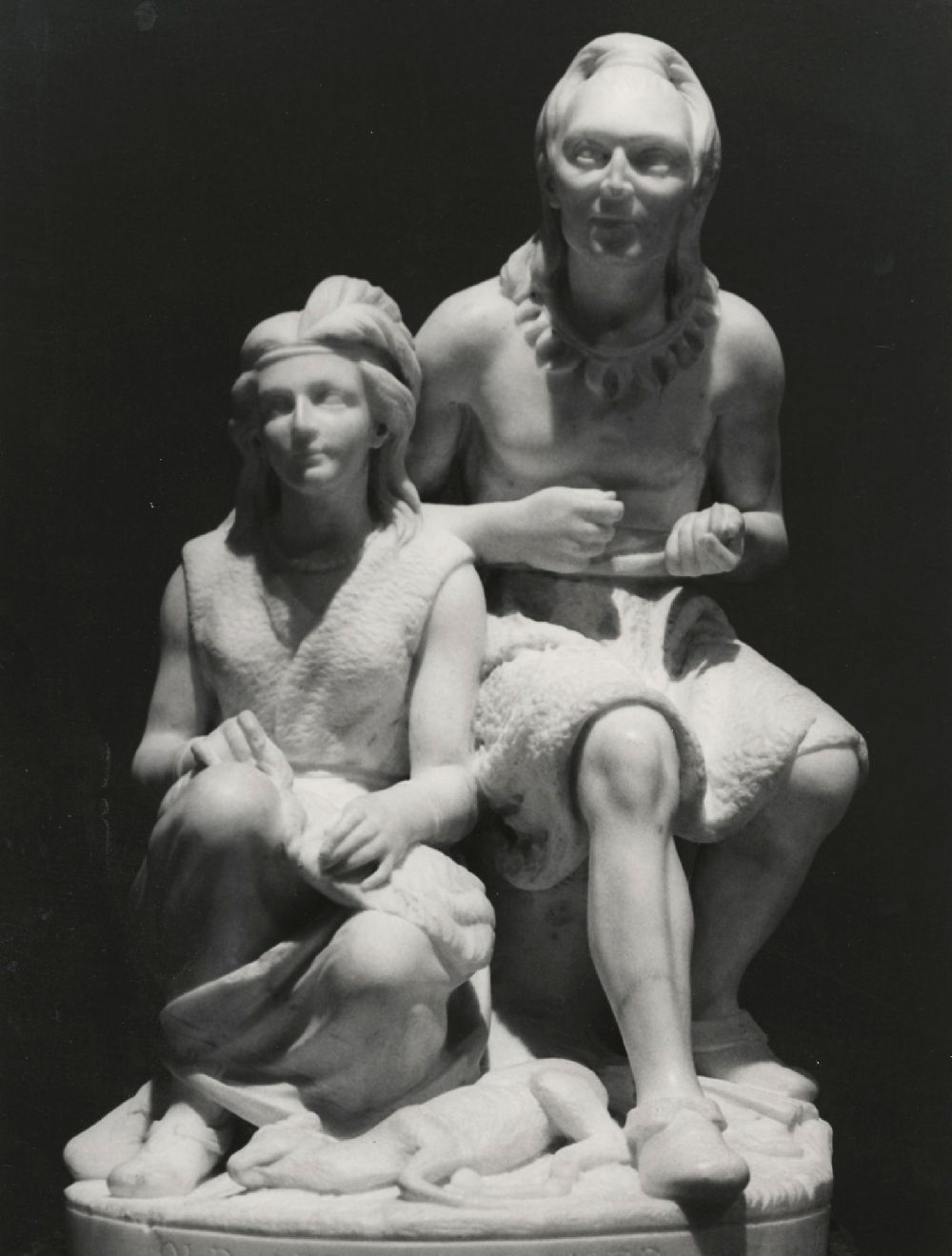
Edmonia Lewis, Old Arrow Maker, 1866–1872, photo by David Finn, ©David Finn Archive, Department of Image Collections, National Gallery of Art Library, Washington, DC

== Posthumous exhibitions ==
- Art of the American Negro Exhibition, American Negro Exposition, Chicago, Illinois, 1940.
- Howard University, Washington, D.C., 1967.
- "The White, Marmorean Flock": Nineteenth-Century Women Neoclassical Sculptors," Vassar College, New York, 1972.
- Michael Rosenfeld Gallery, New York, 2008.
- Edmonia Lewis and Henry Wadsworth Longfellow: Images and Identities at the Fogg Art Museum, Cambridge, Massachusetts, February 18 –May 3, 1995.
- Smithsonian American Art Museum, Washington, D.C., June 7, 1996 – April 14, 1997.
- Wildfire Test Pit, Allen Memorial Art Museum, Oberlin College, Oberlin, Ohio, August 30, 2016 – June 12, 2017.
- Hearts of Our People: Native Women Artists, (2019), Minneapolis Institute of Art, Minneapolis, Minnesota, United States.
- Edmonia Lewis's Bust of Christ, Mount Stuart, UK
- Edmonia Lewis: Indelible Impressions, Cantor Arts Center at Stanford University, Stanford, California, September 17, 2025 – January 4, 2026.
- Edmonia Lewis: Said in Stone, Peabody Essex Museum, Salem, Massachusetts, February 14 – June 7, 2026, Georgia Museum of Art, Athens, Georgia, August 8, 2026 – January 3, 2027, and North Carolina Museum of Art, Raleigh, North Carolina, April 3 – July 11, 2027.
- Chisel & Razor: The Artistic Legacies of Edmonia & Samuel Lewis, Tinworks, Bozeman, Montana, Act 1: June 19 – October 31, 2026, Act 2: October 1, 2026 – April 4, 2027.

== See also ==
- List of female sculptors
- Samuel Lewis House (Bozeman, Montana): Brother's house in Montana
- Moses Jacob Ezekiel, another American sculptor in Rome around the same time period, and also included in 1876 Philadelphia exposition.
- Women in the art history field

== Bibliography ==
- Buick, Kirsten Pai (2010). Child of the Fire: Mary Edmonia Lewis and the Problem of Art History's Black and Indian Subject. Durham, NC: Duke University Press. ISBN 978-0-8223-4266-3.
- Chadwick, Whitney (2012). Women, Art, and Society (5th ed.). New York, NY: Thames and Hudson. ISBN 978-0-500-20405-4.
- "The Death of Cleopatra". Smithsonian American Art Museum (museum catalog record).
- Gold, Susanna W. (Spring 2012). "The death of Cleopatra / the birth of freedom: Edmonia Lewis at the new world's fair". Biography. 35 (2): 318–324. doi:10.1353/bio.2012.0014. S2CID 162076591 – via EBSCO.
- Hartigan, Lynda Roscoe (1985). Sharing Traditions: Five Black Artists in Nineteenth-Century America: From the Collections of the National Museum of American Art. Washington, DC: Smithsonian Institution Press. OCLC 11398839.
- Henderson, Harry; Henderson, Albert (2012). The Indomitable Spirit of Edmonia Lewis: a narrative biography. Esquiline Hill Press. ISBN 978-1-58863-451-1.
- Katz, William L.; Franklin, Paula A. (1993). "Edmonia Lewis: Sculptor". Proudly Red and Black: Stories of African and Native Americans. New York: Maxwell Macmillan. ISBN 978-0-689-31801-6.
- May, Stephen (September 1996). "The Object at Hand". Smithsonian. p. 20.
- Nelson, Charmaine A. (2007). The Color of Stone: Sculpting the Black Female Subject in Nineteenth-Century America. Minneapolis: University of Minnesota Press. ISBN 978-0-8166-4651-7.
- Perry, Regenia A. (1992). Free within Ourselves: African-American Artists in the Collection of the National Museum of American Art. Washington, D.C.: National Museum of American Art. ISBN 978-1-56640-073-2.
- Pickett, Mary (March 1, 2002). "Samuel W. Lewis: Orphan leaves mark on Bozeman". Billings Gazette.
- Plowden, Martha W. (1994). "Edmonia Lewis-Sculptor". Famous Firsts of Black Women (2nd ed.). Gretna: Pelican Company. ISBN 978-1-56554-197-9.
- Richardson, Marilyn (2009). "Edmonia Lewis and Her Italian Circle," in Serpa Salenius, ed., Sculptors, Painters, and Italy: ItalianInfluence on Nineteenth-Century American Art, Padua, Italy: Il Prato Casa Editrice, pp. 99–110. Retrieved February 1, 2019.
- Richardson, Marilyn (2011). "Sculptor's Death Unearthed: Edmonia Lewis Died in 1907", ARTFIXdaily, January 9, 2011. Retrieved February 1, 2019.
- Richardson, Marilyn (2011). "Three Indians in Battle by Edmonia Lewis", Maine Antique Digest, January 2011, p. 10-A. Retrieved February 1, 2019.
- Richardson, Marilyn (1986). "Vita: Edmonia Lewis," Harvard Magazine, March 1986. Retrieved February 1, 2019.
- Richardson, Marilyn (Summer 2008). "Edmonia Lewis at McGrawville: The early education of a nineteenth-century black women artist". Nineteenth-Century Contexts. 22 (2): 239–256. doi:10.1080/08905490008583510. S2CID 192202984.
- Rindfleisch, Jan (2017). Roots and Offshoots: Silicon Valley's Arts Community. pp. 61–62. Santa Clara, CA: Ginger Press. ISBN 978-0-9983084-0-1
- "Sculptor Edmonia Lewis' 'Cleopatra' revived and on view in Washington: Heritage Corner". New York Amsterdam News. Vol. 87, no. 22. June 1, 1996. p. 37. ISSN 1059-1818. ProQuest 390284855.
- Wolfe, Rinna Evelyn (1998). Edmonia Lewis: Wildfire in Marble. Parsippany, NJ: Dillon Press. ISBN 978-0-382-39714-1.
- Woods, Naurice Frank (1994). Insuperable Obstacles: The Impact of Racism on the Creative and Personal Development of Four Nineteenth Century African American Artists (reprint ed.). Cincinnati: Union Institute.
