= Hiawatha and Minnehaha by Edmonia Lewis =

Pair of sculptures by Edmonia Lewis

Hiawatha and Minnehaha
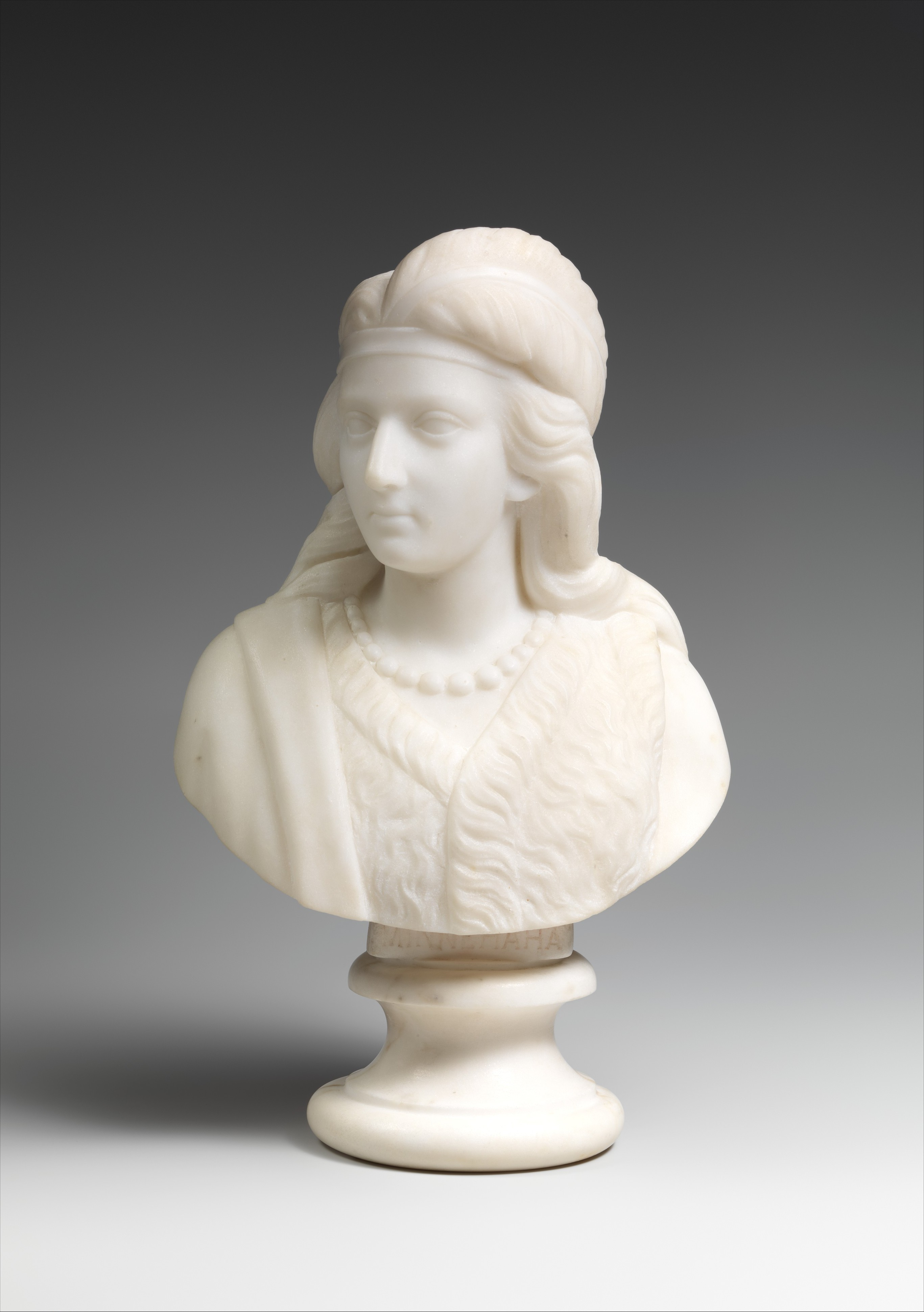
- Minnehaha
- Artist: Edmonia Lewis
- Year: 1868

Hiawatha and Minnehaha are 1868 sculptures by Edmonia Lewis. They are in the collection of the Metropolitan Museum of Art on view in gallery 731.

== Early history and creation ==
Lewis, an African-American, Haitian, and Chippewa (Ojibwa) artist, developed her neoclassical style of marble sculpture while working in Rome. While Lewis often told reporters and friends about her childhood growing up in the Chippewa community in upstate New York, historians now say her stories were largely fictionalized and note that she spent most of her childhood in the North Ward of Newark, New Jersey.

Lewis was an admirer of Henry Wadsworth Longfellow's poetry, and in 1869 Longfellow visited her studio where he posed for one of her portraits which was shortly afterward acquired by Harvard University. During Lewis' years in Rome, she became something of a celebrity, with several wealthy Americans visiting her studio while they took the Grand Tour.

== Description and interpretation ==
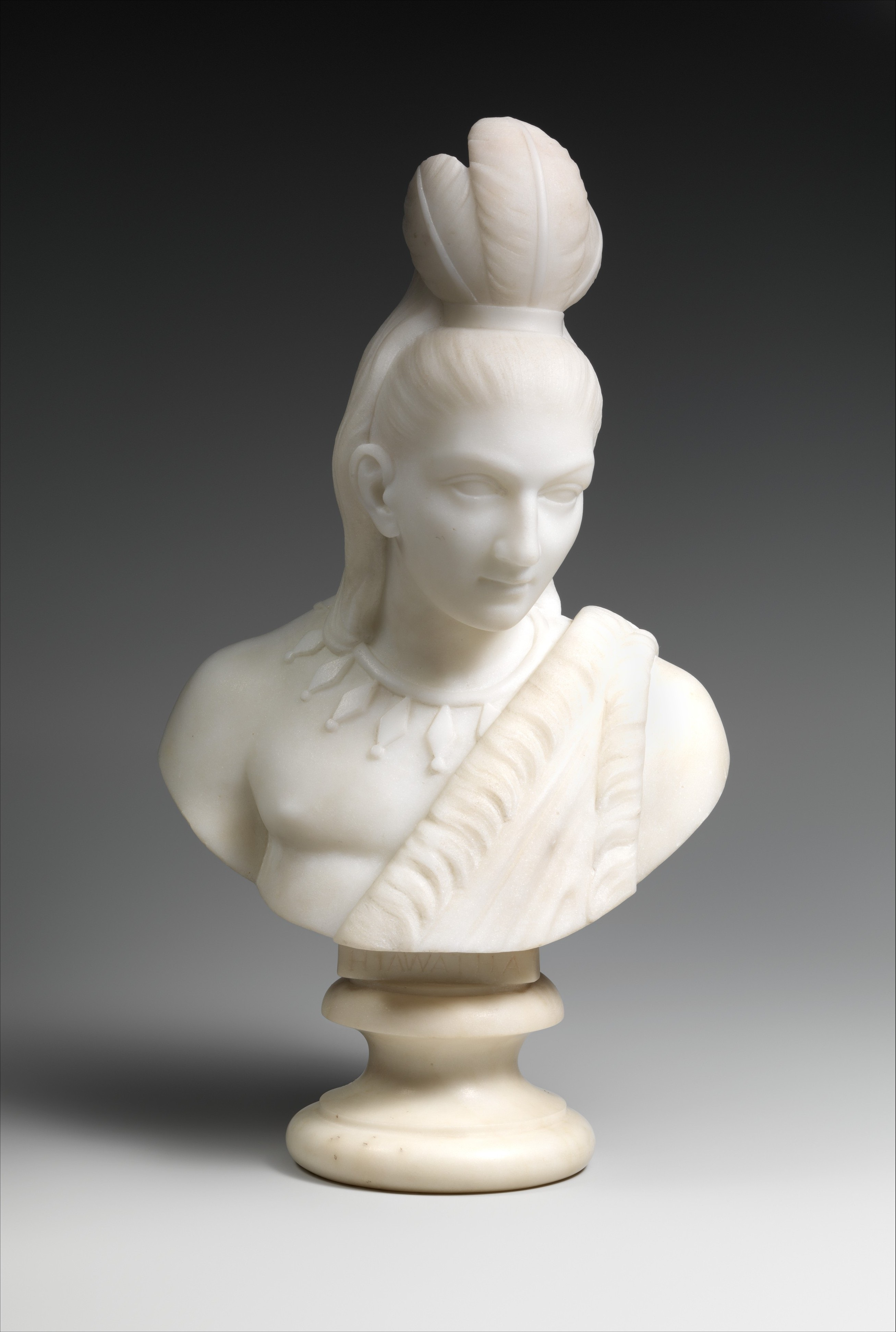
Hiawatha

Often working in themes that intersected her identity, Lewis focused a series of marble sculptures based on Longfellow’s much-referenced and internationally best-selling poem “The Song of Hiawatha” (1855) about the Ojibwa warrior, Hiawatha's tragic story with his lover from a rival tribe, Minnehaha (Dakota). Her time in Rome began a period in which she created several cabinet-sized busts that depicted Hiawatha and Minnehaha. But while Hiawatha was a real-life leader, the Longfellow poem Lewis based the work on drew inspiration from several Indigenous American traditions and figures. Other works featuring the couple include her 1874 sculpture Hiawatha's Marriage, while her 1872 work "The Old Arrow Maker," depicts Minnehaha and her father looking up to greet Hiawatha as he brings his future bride a token of marriage.

In addition to paying tribute to her heritage, Lewis also took agency by utilizing concepts of the Noble Savage in these works, idealizing and fantasizing the form and dress of the two fictional characters. Unlike other images of this theme and time, Lewis subversively focused not on their naked flesh, which historically attracted male collectors, but on decorating their bodies in clothing, which was intended to appeal to the women viewers. The works became popular for collectors not only because of her high skill level, but also with the help of Lewis' tales, exaggerating her connection to her First Nations ancestry, having actually grown up in Newark, NJ, thus capitalizing on the popular culture's fascination with the "romantic primitive."

Lewis's portrayals of Hiawatha and Minnehaha — two lovers from opposing nations — have also been interpreted as symbolic of post-Civil War America and the need to reunite by some art historians. But while critics in the 1860s and 70s praised Lewis' depictions of Native Americans as "authentic," there is no evidence that Native Americans felt the same way. As historian Harry Henderson noted in his book "The Indomitable Spirit of Edmonia Lewis," while Lewis' used her Native roots as a selling point to market her art, "she took no occasion to remind anyone of important issues: broken treaties, the oppression of increasing European settlement, and the distress of Native sovereignties."

Historian Juanita Marie Holland agreed with that sentiment, noting that "when compared with contemporary images of Ojibwa men and women, Lewis's Native Americans are clearly more evocative of the sentimental visions of Indian life safely set in the distant past that were cherished by Anglo-Americans.

== Later history and influence ==
The pair of sculptures was acquired by the Metropolitan Museum of Art in 2015.

In 2000 the Newark Museum acquired a separate pair through Christie's Auction House for above their estimated bid prices of $60000 each.

Aside from this pair of small busts, Lewis' series includes Wooing of Hiawatha (or The Old Arrowmaker and His Daughter),1866-1872, which one of six is in The Walter O. Evans Collection at the SCAD Museum of Art, and The Marriage of Hiawatha and Minnehaha (or Hiawatha's Marriage), 1866–1868, rediscovered in 1991, which one of two is in the collection of Montgomery Museum of Fine Arts.

Hiawatha was included in a group exhibition in 2017 called On Such a Night as This at American Contemporary Art Galleries in New York surveying rare works by historic African American artists.
