= The Death of Cleopatra (Edmonia Lewis) =

1875 sculpture by Edmonia Lewis

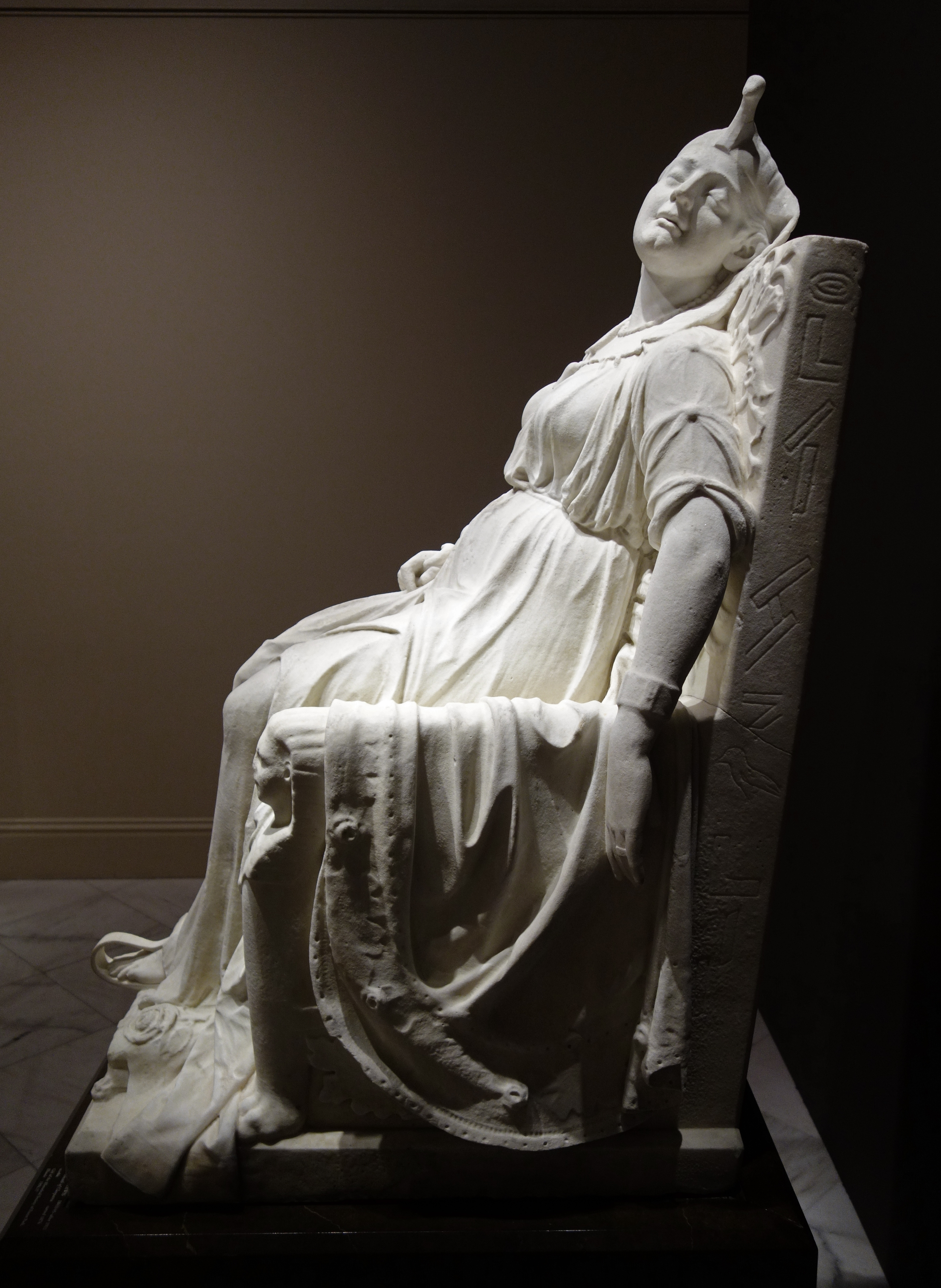
The Death of Cleopatra by Edmonia Lewis.

The Death of Cleopatra is a neoclassical sculpture by African-American and Native American artist Edmonia Lewis (1844–1907). It was created in 1875 for display at the 1876 Centennial Exposition in Philadelphia, Pennsylvania. Weighing nearly three tons, it depicts Cleopatra moments after her death by suicide from the bite of an asp. The snake can be seen in Cleopatra's right hand. It is currently held in the collection of the Smithsonian American Art Museum.

== History ==
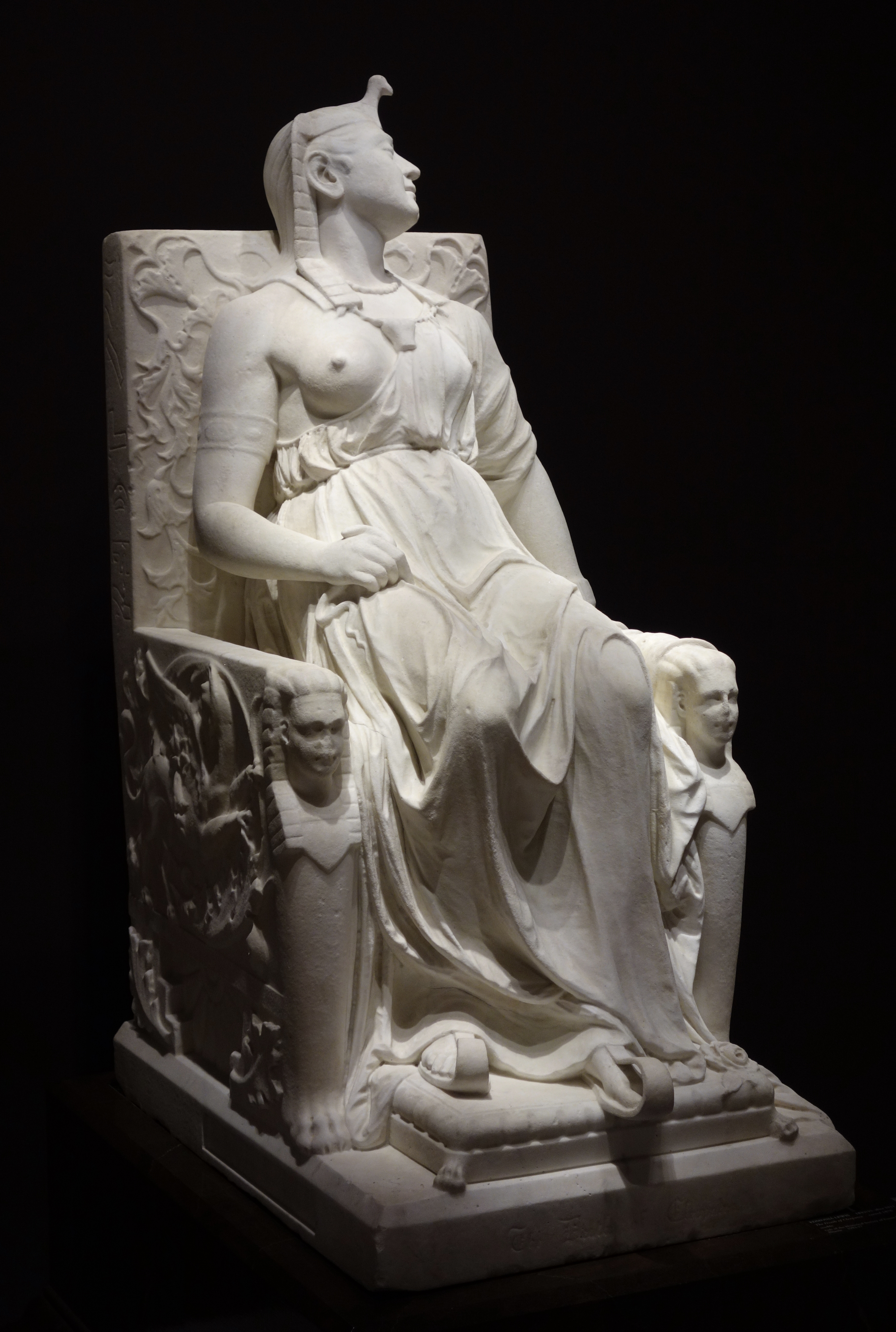
The Death of Cleopatra

The Death of Cleopatra is Edmonia Lewis's largest known work of art. It was created in Rome, Italy in 1875. It was shipped to the United States for its first display in the Women's Pavilion at the Centennial Exposition in Philadelphia, Pennsylvania in 1876. alongside six of her smaller works. The work was unusual for the period as prior depictions of the tale of Cleopatra's suicide had typically depicted the figure as still living and in contemplation over her choice to die; holding the snake in a state about to bite her exposed breast. Lewis's depiction chose instead to present Cleopatra as already dead with the cloak of Isis draped about her. Rather than show an ordered queenly figure as was typical of classicism, her Cleopatra is in disarray bringing in an element of realism then new to Cleopatra depictions in the art canon.

Cleopatra was immensely popular with both the public and art critics upon its display in Philadelphia; in part due to the public fascination with death and dying. It was viewed by the artist Margaret Foley who took inspiration from the sculpture in future work of her own, and the work inspired a move towards realism among other artists. After being placed in storage, the statue was moved to the 1878 Chicago Interstate Exposition where it had a similar enthusiastic response from the public. Unable to have the sculpture shipped back to her in Rome, the plan was for Lewis to sell the work in America which she did do. The known location of the sculpture became obscured after this point, and it was long thought "lost" for more than 100 years.

In 1989 the location of Lewis's Cleopatra and its history in the intervening years was uncovered. Marilyn Richardson, an assistant professor at the Massachusetts Institute of Technology (MIT), and later curator and scholar of African-American art, went searching for The Death of Cleopatra for her biography of Lewis. Richardson was directed to the Forest Park Historical Society and Dr. Orland by the Metropolitan Museum of Art, who had earlier been contacted by the historical society regarding the sculpture. It was learned that the sculpture was acquired by a gambler by the name of "Blind John" Condon, who purchased it from a saloon on Clark Street to mark the grave of a racehorse named "Cleopatra". The grave was in front of the grandstand of his Harlem race track in the Chicago suburb of Forest Park, where the sculpture remained for nearly a century until the land was bought by the U.S. Postal Service and the sculpture was moved to a construction storage yard in Cicero, Illinois. While at the storage yard, The Death of Cleopatra sustained extensive damage at the hands of well-meaning Boy Scouts who painted and caused other damage to the sculpture. Dr. James Orland, a dentist in Forest Park and a member of the Forest Park Historical Society, acquired the sculpture and held it in private storage at the Forest Park Mall.

Richardson, after confirming the sculpture's location, contacted African-American bibliographer Dorothy Porter Wesley, and the two gained the attention of NMAA's George Gurney. According to Gurney, Curator Emeritus at the Smithsonian American Art Museum, the sculpture was in a race track in Forest Park, Illinois, during World War II. Finally, the sculpture came under the purview of the Forest Park Historical Society, which donated it to Smithsonian American Art Museum in 1994. Chicago-based Andrezej Dajnowski, in conjunction with the Smithsonian, spent $30,000 to restore it to its near-original state. The repairs were extensive, including the nose, sandals, hands, chin, and extensive "sugaring" (disintegration).

== Assessment ==
Like Harriet Hosmer's earlier Zenobia in Chains (1859), Lewis's Cleopatra depicts a contradiction of a woman simultaneously embodying both female power and female vulnerability. The exposed breast indicates sexual availability while her death indicates punishment for that sensuality.

== Other images ==
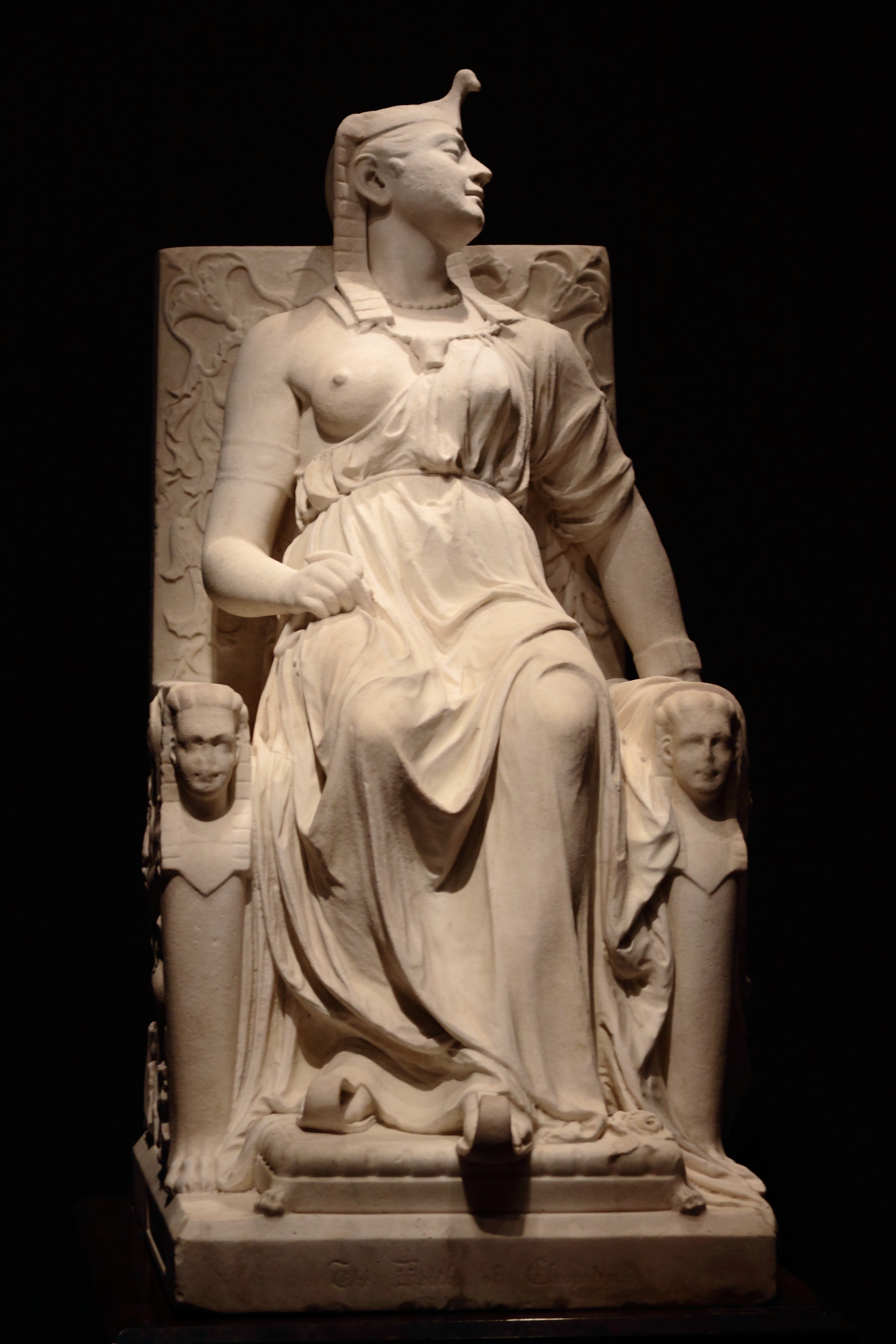

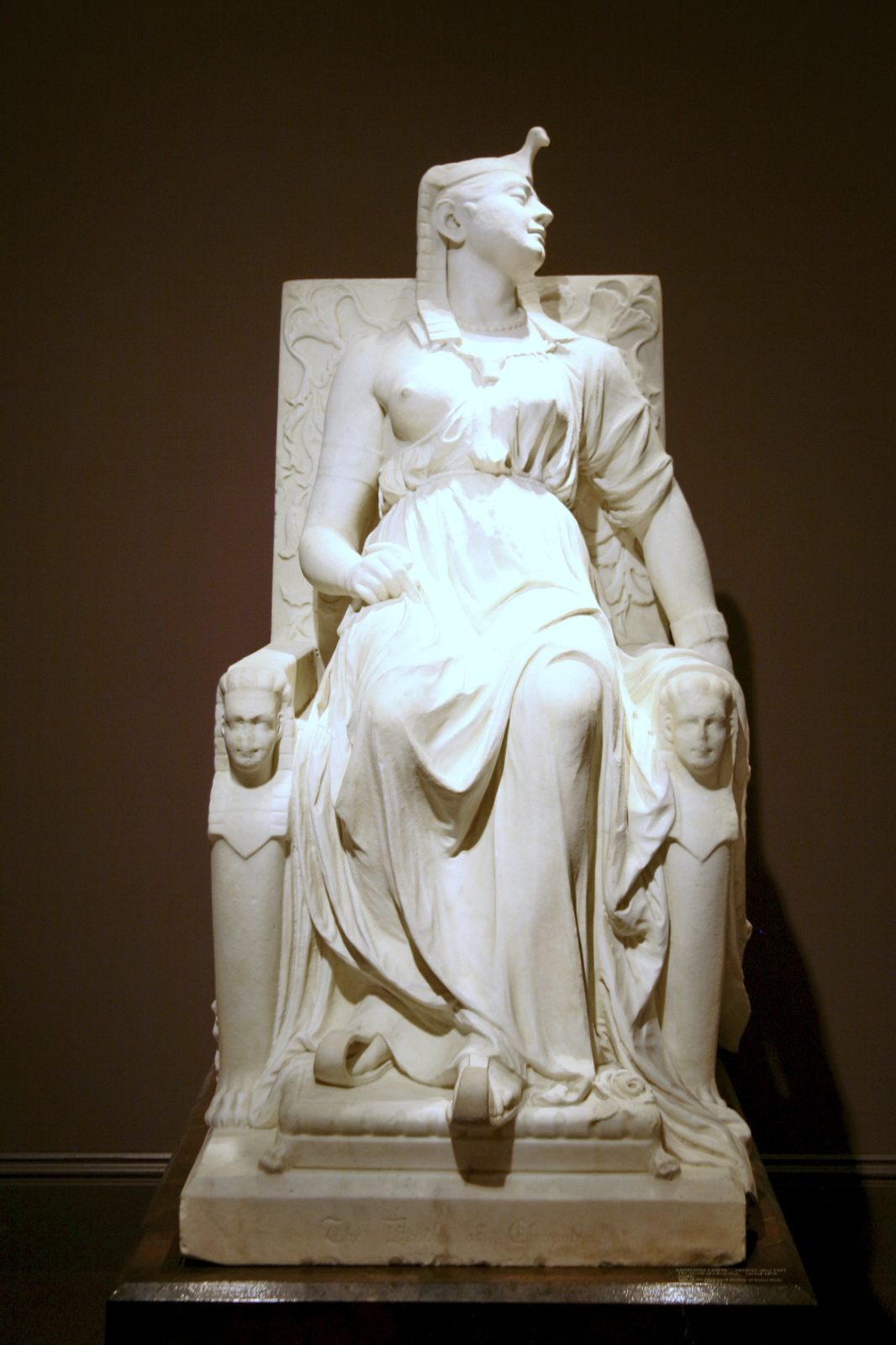

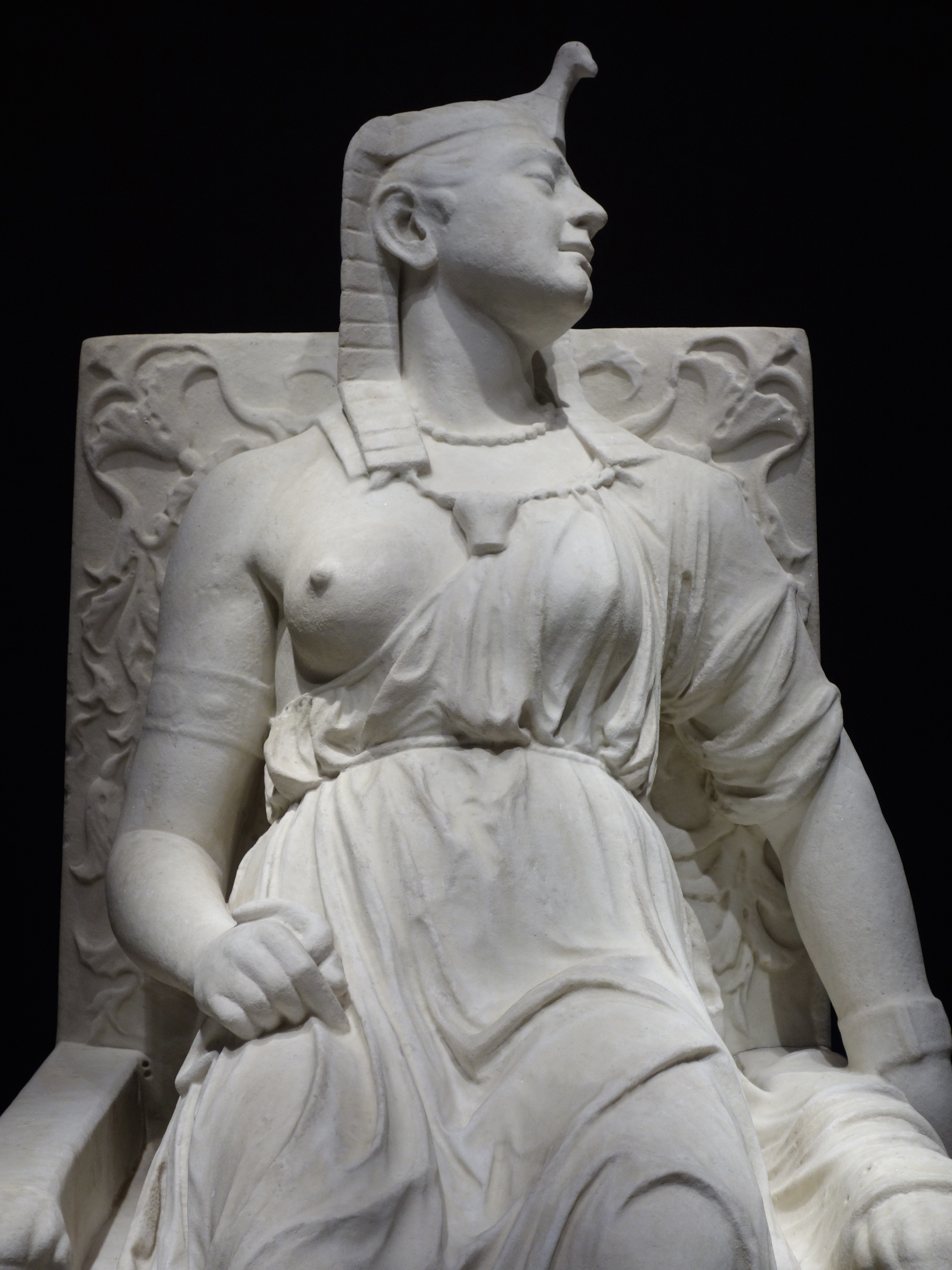

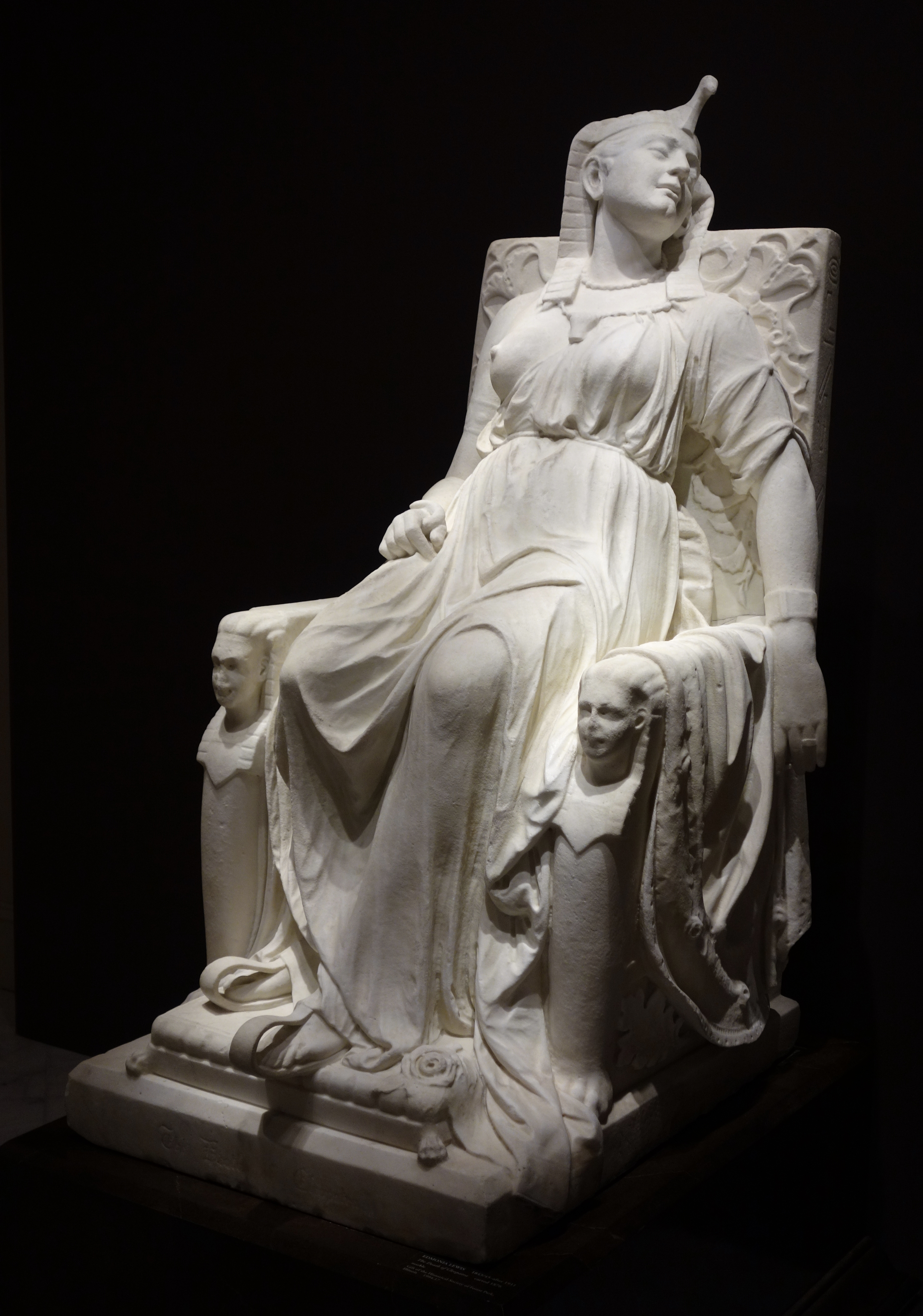

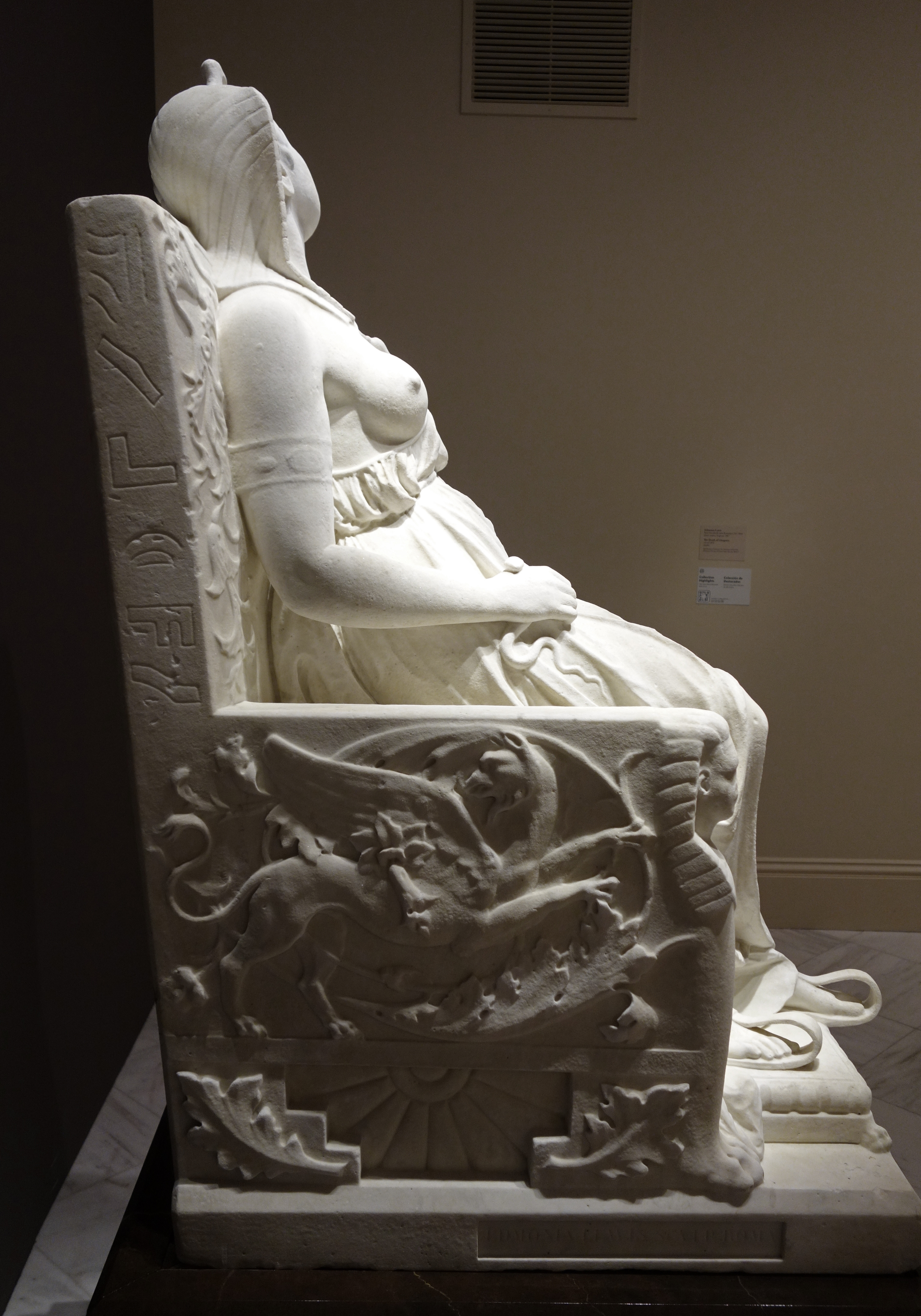

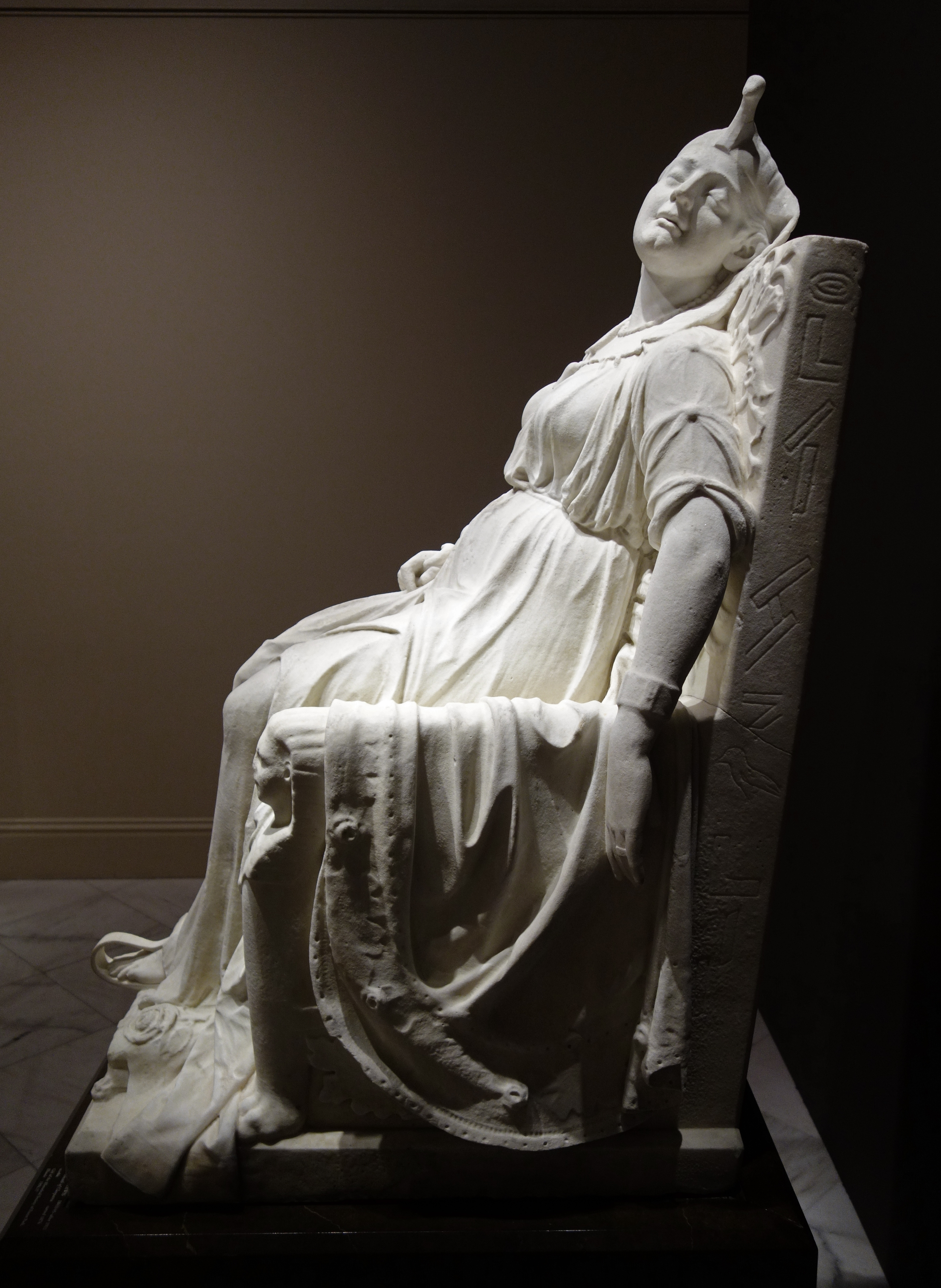

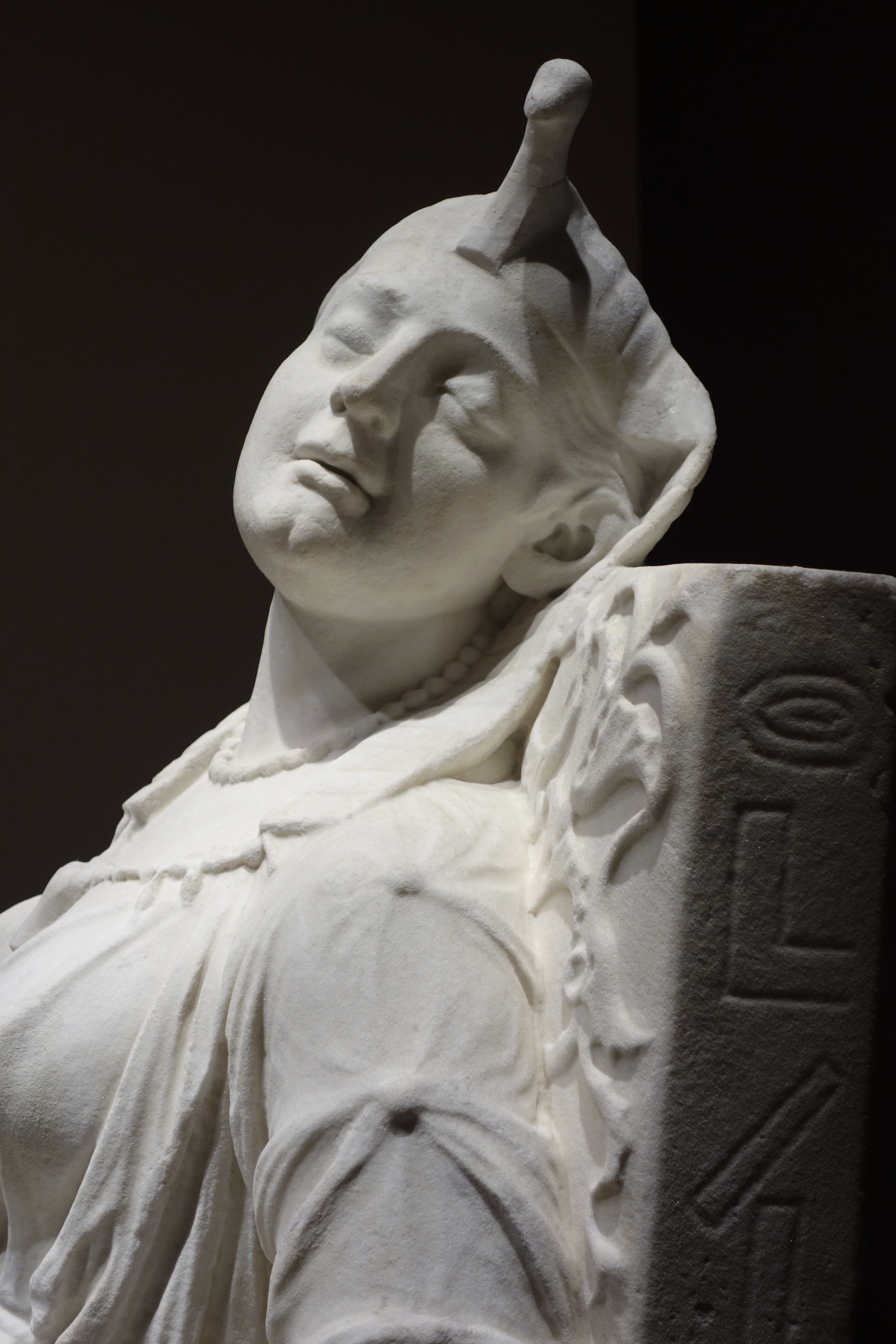
