= Samuel Lewis House (Bozeman, Montana) =

Historic house in Montana, United States

- U.S. National Register of Historic Places
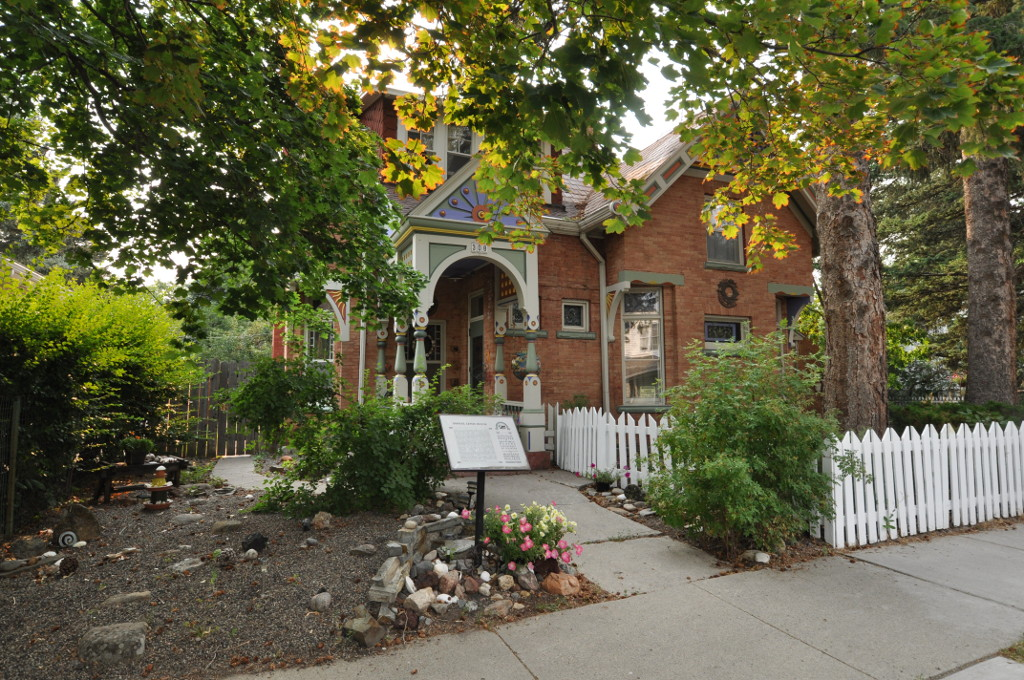

- Location within Montana Location within the United States
- Location: 308 S. Bozeman Ave., Bozeman, Montana
- Coordinates: 45°40′33″N 111°1′59″W
- Built: 1881
- Architectural style: Queen Anne, Stick/Eastlake
- NRHP reference No.: 99000342
- Added to NRHP: March 18, 1999

Samuel Lewis House in Bozeman, Montana, United States, was built in 1881. It was listed on the National Register of Historic Places in 1999.

Samuel Lewis was the older brother of artist Edmonia Lewis. He was born in Haiti in 1835, grew up in upstate New York and became a barber in San Francisco, eventually moving to mining camps in Idaho and Montana. In 1868, he settled in the city of Bozeman, where he set up a barber shop on Main Street. He prospered, eventually investing in commercial real estate, and subsequently built his own home which still stands at 308 South Bozeman Avenue. In 1884, he married Mrs. Melissa Railey Bruce, a widow with six children; they had one son, Samuel E. Lewis (1886-1914), who married but died childless. The elder Lewis died after "a short illness" in 1896 and is buried in Sunset Hills Cemetery in Bozeman.
