= Edward A. Brackett House =

Historic house in Massachusetts, United States

- U.S. National Register of Historic Places
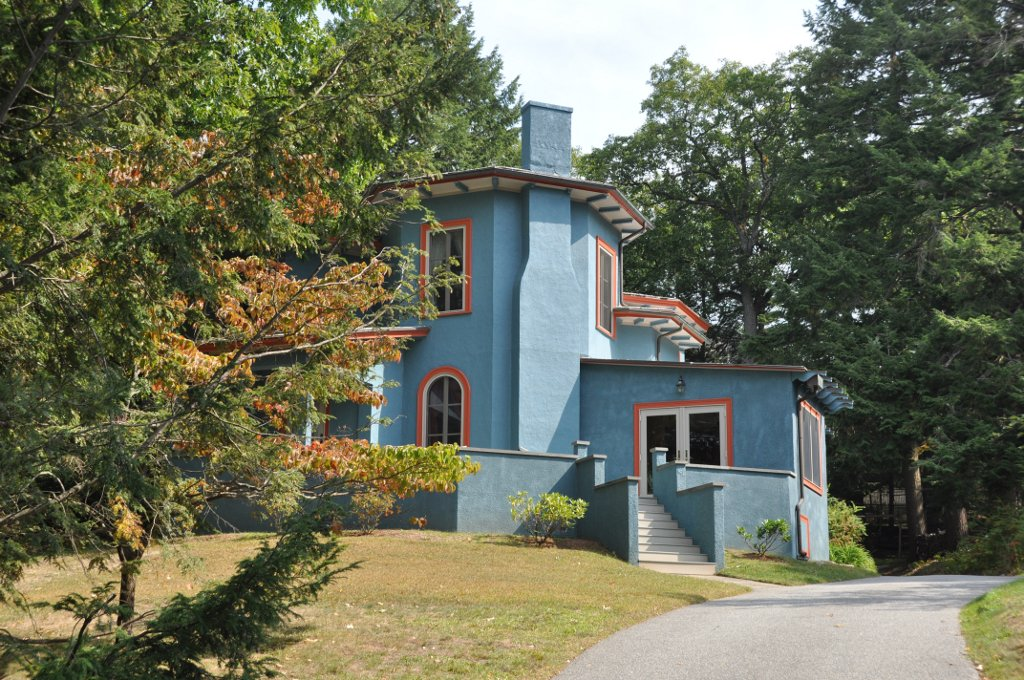

- Location within Massachusetts Location within the United States
- Location: 290 Highland Ave., Winchester, Massachusetts
- Coordinates: 42°27′0″N 71°7′45″W
- Built: 1850
- Architect: Brackett, Edward A.
- Architectural style: Octagon Mode
- MPS: Winchester MRA
- NRHP reference No.: 89000626
- Added to NRHP: July 5, 1989

The Edward A. Brackett House is a historic octagon house at 290 Highland Avenue in Winchester, Massachusetts. Built in the early 1850s by sculptor Edward Augustus Brackett, and based on popular plans described by Orson Squire Fowler, it is Winchester's only octagonal house. The house was listed on the National Register of Historic Places in 1989.

== Description and history ==
The Brackett House is set back from the east side of Highland Avenue, a north–south route through the east side of Winchester. The house, as built in the early 1850s, is a distinctive design made by Brackett, an eccentric artist and naturalist, that adhered fairly closely to recommendations of Orson Squire Fowler in the first edition of The Octagon House: A Home for All, the work which set off a brief period of interest in those houses. It consisted of a series of four interlocking octagons, with varying heights and roof lines to create interesting visual effects. A fifth octagonal unit was added by Brackett in c. 1900 which added a shed space on the first floor and a bedroom on the second, along with a veranda. The building was originally finished in vertical board-and-batten siding and trimmed with then-fashionable Italianate brackets under its eaves, but these features were removed during the 1900 renovations, and the building exterior was redone in stucco.

== Edward A. Brackett ==
Edward Brackett was a distinctive local personality, trained as a sculptor but also a poet and conservationist. He established a fish hatchery nearby, and ran a commercial nursery. He lived in the house until his death in 1908.

== See also ==
- List of octagon houses
- National Register of Historic Places listings in Winchester, Massachusetts
