= Edward Augustus Brackett =

American sculptor (1818–1908)

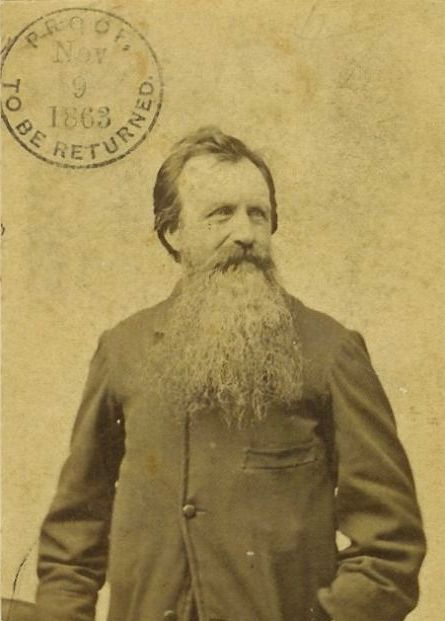
Edward Augustus Brackett, November 1863

Edward Augustus Brackett (October 1, 1818 – March 15, 1908) was a self-taught American sculptor, author, and conservationist.

== Biography ==
Brackett was born in Vassalboro, Maine to Reuben and Elizabeth (Starkey) Brackett, and moved with his parents in the spring of 1837 to Cincinnati, where he started work as a sculptor. In 1839 he showed a pair of portrait busts at the Cincinnati Academy of Fine Arts, and subsequently moved to New York City. In 1841, after roughly two years in New York, he moved to Boston with an introduction from his friend William Cullen Bryant, where from 1843 he lived in Winchester, Massachusetts (at that time Woburn), from the early 1850s onward in the octagonal Edward A. Brackett House.

In October 1859, after the raid on Harper's Ferry, Brackett traveled to the jail there, where he made sketches and measurements of John Brown's head, which he subsequently cast as a bust. It is today (2022) at Tufts University.

After serving one year in the Civil War, he turned to horticulture and the scientific breeding of fish.

In 1869, he was appointed to a state commission supervising inland fisheries, and became its head in 1873. From 1894 until his death he served as head of the Massachusetts Fish and Game Commission.

He died in Winchester on March 15, 1908.

== Family ==
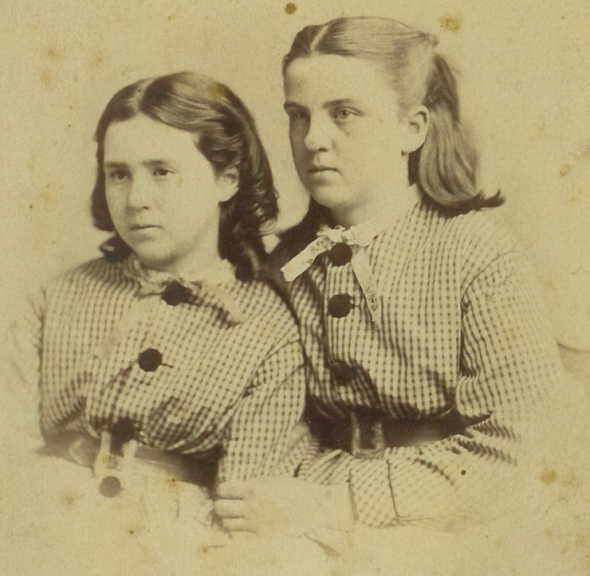
Bess and Lena Brackett

Edward Brackett married Amanda Folger on November 27, 1842 in Charlestown, Massachusetts. They had four children; Frank, Walter, Lena, and Bessie. Amanda (Folger) Brackett died in 1871, at the age of 50.

In 1872, Brackett married Elizabeth F. Belville, his wife's niece. They had one daughter, Bertha, born in 1876.

== Selected sculptures ==
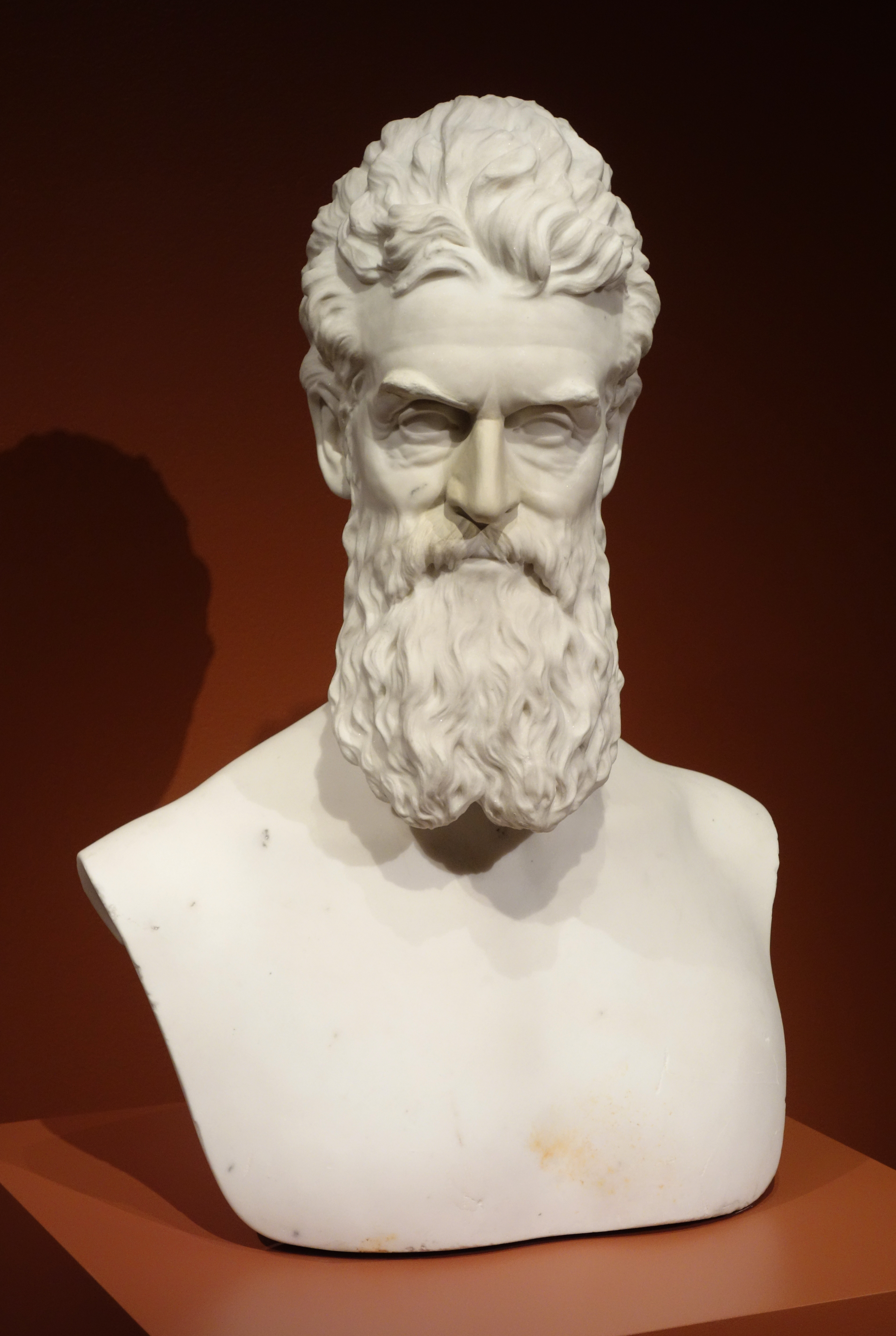
Bust of John Brown, 1860

- Washington Allston bust, 1844, Metropolitan Museum
- Shipwrecked Mother and Child, 1848–51, Worcester Art Museum
- Reverend Hosea Ballou, 1859, Mount Auburn Cemetery
- Bust of John Brown, 1860, Tufts University.

== Selected books ==
- Twilight Hours or Leisure Moments of an Artist, 1845
- The World We Live In, 1903
- My House, Chips the Builder Threw Away, Gorham Press, 1904
- Materialized Apparitions: If Not Beings From Another Life, What Are They, Gorham Press, 1908
