= The Death of Cleopatra =

The Death of Cleopatra refers to the demise of Cleopatra VII, the last ruler of the Ptolemaic Kingdom of Egypt who died on either 10 or 12 August, 30 BC, in Alexandria, when she was 39 years old. The Death of Cleopatra is the name of multiple works depicting that event. These include:

- The Death of Cleopatra (Edmonia Lewis), 1875 sculpture by Edmonia Lewis at the Smithsonian American Art Museum.
- The Death of Cleopatra (Juan Luna), 1881 oil painting by Juan Luna at the Museo del Prado in Madrid, Spain
- The Death of Cleopatra (Collier), 1890 oil painting by John Collier
- The Death of Cleopatra (Jean-André Rixens), 1874 oil painting by Jean-André Rixens at the Musée des Augustins, in Toulouse.
- The Death of Cleopatra (play), 1929 play by Egyptian writer Ahmed Shawqi

== See also ==
- List of cultural depictions of Cleopatra
