= The Death of Cleopatra (Jean-André Rixens) =

1874 painting by Jean-André Rixens

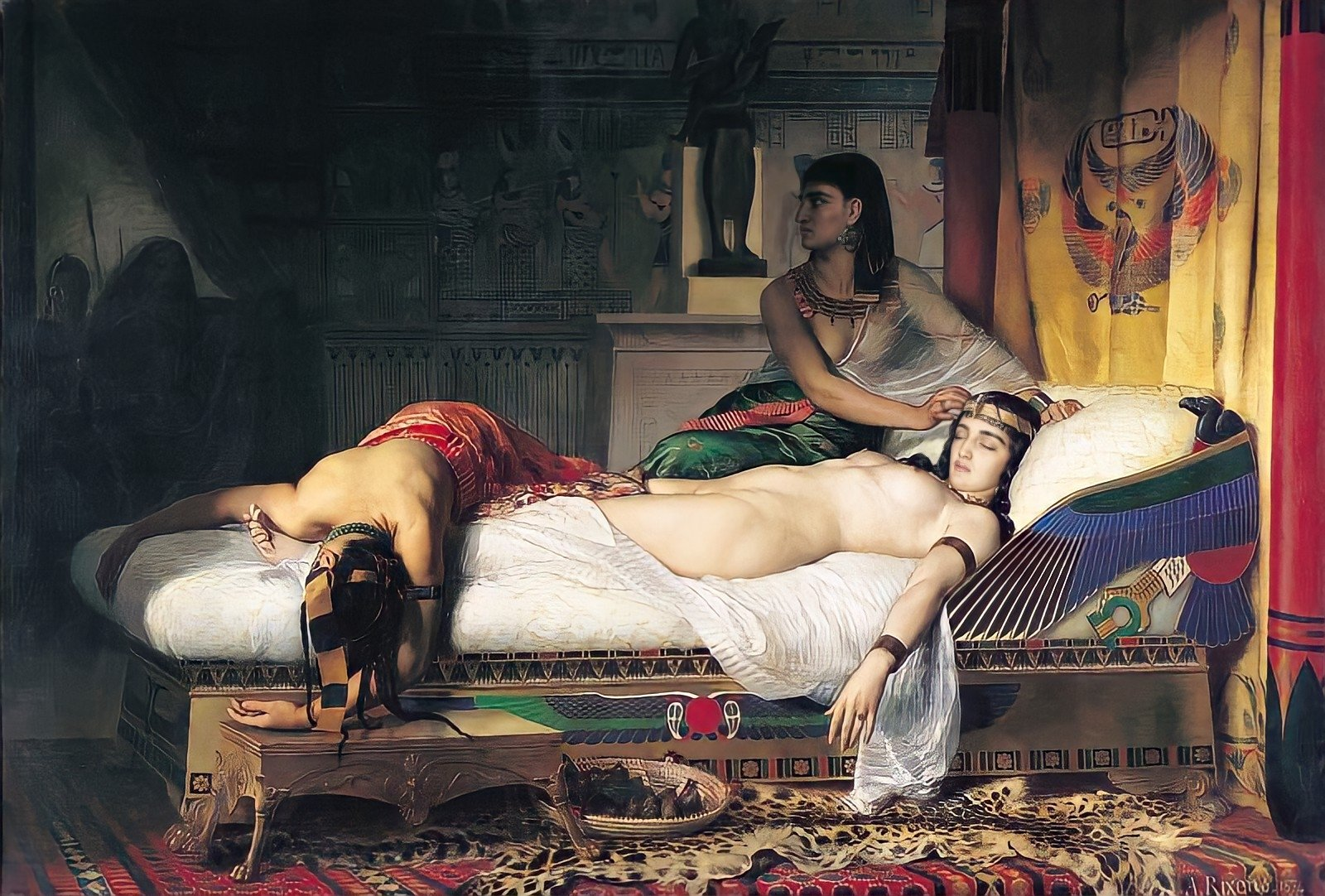
- Artist: Jean-André Rixens
- Year: 1874
- Medium: Oil on canvas
- Dimensions: 199 cm × 290 cm (78.5 in × 114 in)
- Location: Musée des Augustins, Toulouse

The Death of Cleopatra is a painting by the French artist Jean-André Rixens. The painting debuted in the 1874 Salon and was most likely was purchased then as well. The painting is in the Musée des Augustins, in Toulouse.

== Composition ==
This large oil on canvas painting has a complex and academic nature to it. It is painted in a classical style depicting Cleopatra's death. Two women are shown in the scene with Cleopatra.
