= House of the Orchard =

Archaeological site in Pompeii, Italy

Coordinates: 40.7510°N 14.4906°E

House of the Orchard Pompeii I.9.5, House of the Floral Cubicula, House of the Orchard, Domus of Euplia
- House
- Casa dei Cubicoli Floreali
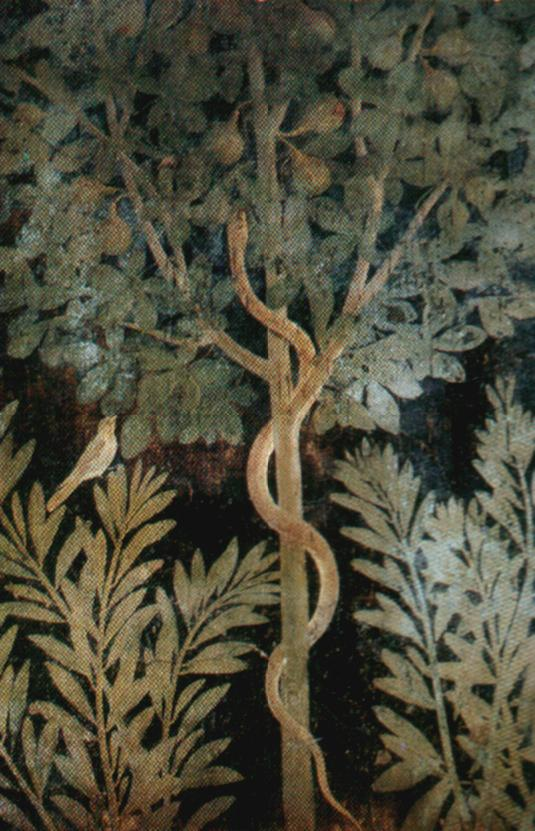
- ancient roman fresco of Pompeii at the house
- Interactive map of House of the Orchard

House of the Orchard (Italian: Casa dei Cubicoli Floreali; also referred to as the Casa del Frutteto or the House of the Garden) is an ancient Roman residential structure located in the archaeological site of Pompeii. Situated on the south side of Via dell'Abbondanza, this house is notable for rich and decorative features. It is also known by various other names, including the House of Euplia and the House of the Flower Cubicles, due to the floral motifs found in its rooms. Like many other structures in Pompeii, it was preserved under volcanic ash following the eruption of Mount Vesuvius in 79 CE.

== Architecture ==
The house was constructed in the late 3rd century BCE but was restructured at least four times. It was being renovated at the time of the Mount Vesuvius eruption in 79 CE. The house follows the standard Roman floor-plan, where the guest garden or atrium is an integral part of the house.

The building is embellished with detailed frescoes depicting a city garden. The paints were typically painted with fresco techniques. The house placed significant emphasis on pictorial decoration, the walls or interior spaces are a canvas for elaborate artwork.

== Modern times ==
The residential complex was brought to light in 1913 and in 1951–52, owes its name to the refined paintings of gardens dating to the time of first roman emperor, Augustus.

It was extensively restored and reopened to the public in February 2020.
