= Epaphroditus (freedman of Augustus) =

Epaphroditus was a freedman of Octavian, the later Emperor Augustus.

After Octavian had succeeded in capturing the Egyptian Queen Cleopatra VII in her Mausoleum in Alexandria she was strictly guarded by Epaphroditus and some other guardians under his command, first in her Mausoleum, then in the palace (early August 30 BC).

Because Octavian allegedly wanted to present Cleopatra in his triumphal procession in Rome, he instructed Epaphroditus to prevent Cleopatra from killing herself. But the Queen was able to feign her will to live so that Epaphroditus observed her less strictly. Then she gave him an urgent sealed letter that he should deliver personally to Octavian and while he was absent she succeeded in committing suicide.

Some modern historians do not believe this ancient tradition, but assume that Octavian had no longer interest in displaying her alive in Rome. Because the Emperor knew that she rather wanted to die than to be presented in a triumph he ordered Epaphroditus – according to this theory – to leave Cleopatra to her own devices, so that she could easily commit suicide. Later he only pretended to be angry that Cleopatra had been able to kill herself.
