= Jean-André Rixens =

French painter

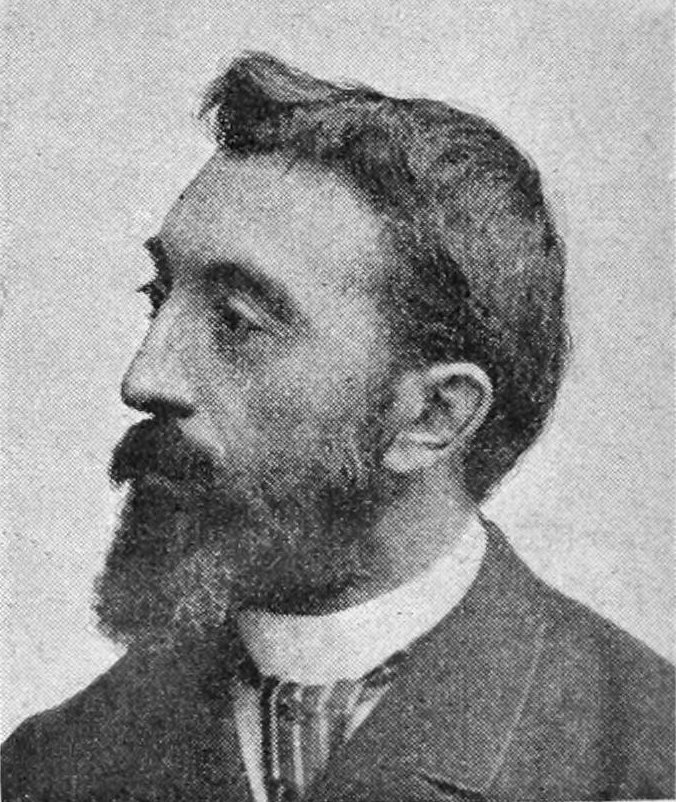
Jean-André Rixens; photograph by Eugène Pirou

Jean-André Rixens (30 November 1846 – 21 February 1925) was a French painter, known for his classical scenes and portraits.

== Biography ==
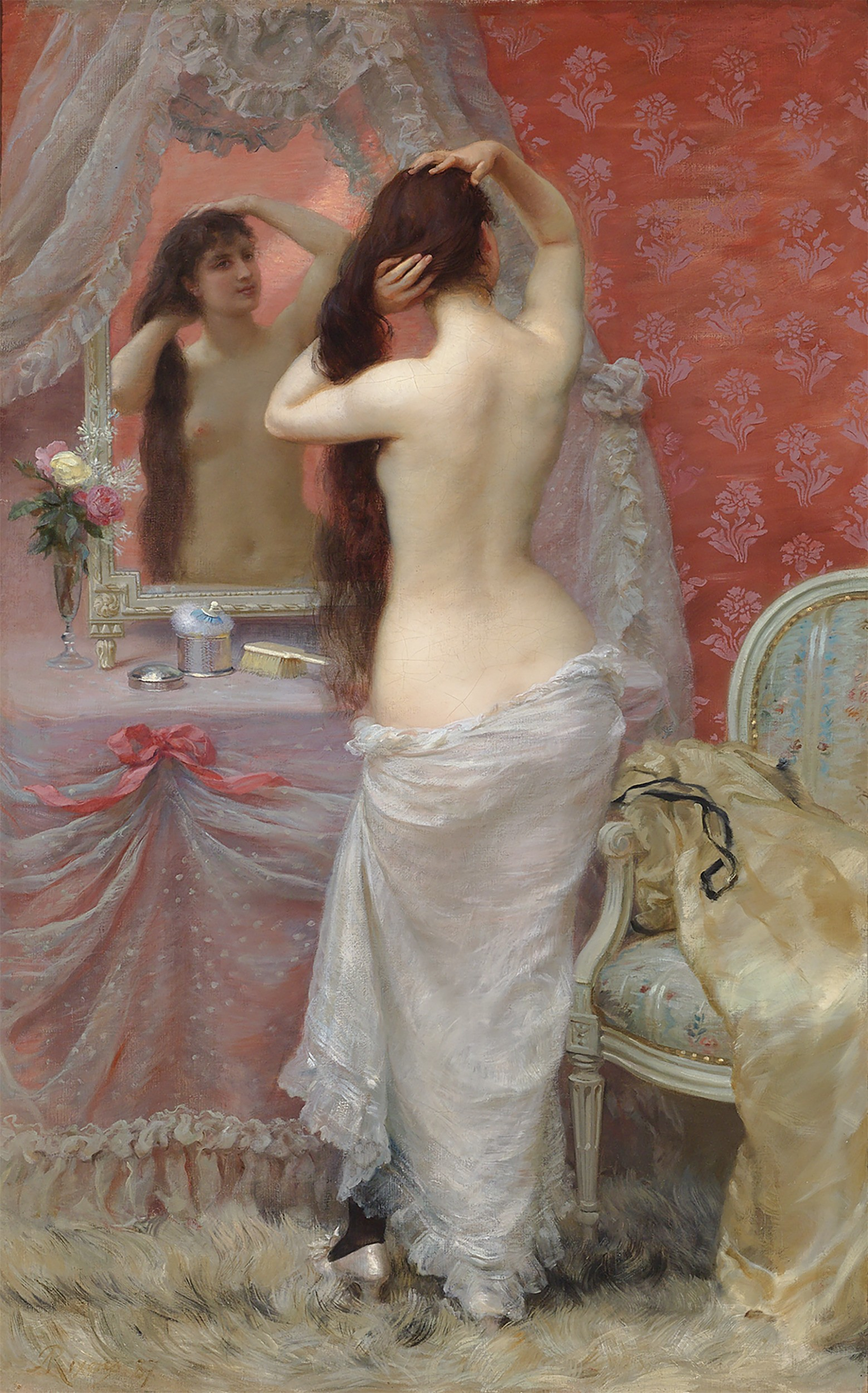
Jeune Femme Nue se Coiffant, 1887

He was born in Saint-Gaudens. His father was a master shoemaker. After completing his basic education, he was enrolled in 1860 at the École supérieure des beaux-arts de Toulouse. He paid for his tuition there and supported himself by painting commercial signs and making copies of artworks. In 1866, his painting The Death of Alcibiades earned him a scholarship from the City of Toulouse. This enabled him to enroll at the École des beaux-arts de Paris, where he studied with the military history painter Adolphe Yvon. While there, he also worked for Goupil & Cie, where he specialized in reproductions of famous works. He also made woodcuts and portraits for the publishing firm Hachette.

In 1867, he found a position in the studio of Jean-Léon Gérôme and completed his artistic studies. At that time, his stated goal was to obtain the prestigious Prix de Rome. His first attempt in 1870 did not succeed. In 1873, he was awarded Second Prize for "Super Flumina Babylonis" (By the Rivers of Babylon, depicting the Babylonian Captivity), which was purchased by the government. Shortly after, he visited Florence and Rome.

During the 1880s, he gained more widespread recognition and his financial situation improved. Many of his works were popularized by major periodicals such as L'Illustration. He also produced fewer historical paintings and concentrated on portraits in a Naturalistic style. Eventually, he was able to purchase property in Normandy. In 1888, he married Eugénie Poumian. They had three daughters. His reputation was assured when he was awarded a medal at the Exposition Universelle (1889). That same year, he was named a Chevalier in the Légion d'honneur.

Together with Ernest Meissonier, Pierre Puvis de Chavannes and Auguste Rodin, he helped revitalize the Société nationale des beaux-arts and organize an annual exhibition that would compete with the world famous Salon. As a confirmed Republican, he participated in the creation and decoration of monuments established by the Third Republic. Between 1896 and 1904, he painted three military scenes in the Salle des Illustres at the Capitole de Toulouse.

During World War I, he took refuge at Saint-Bertrand-de-Comminges, where he helped restore the old episcopal palace. At that time, he painted mostly landscapes in an Impressionist style. All of those works are still in the possession of his descendants. After the war, he worked on creating a monument honoring those from that area who had died in the war.

Later, he returned to Paris and died there in 1925.

== Selected works ==
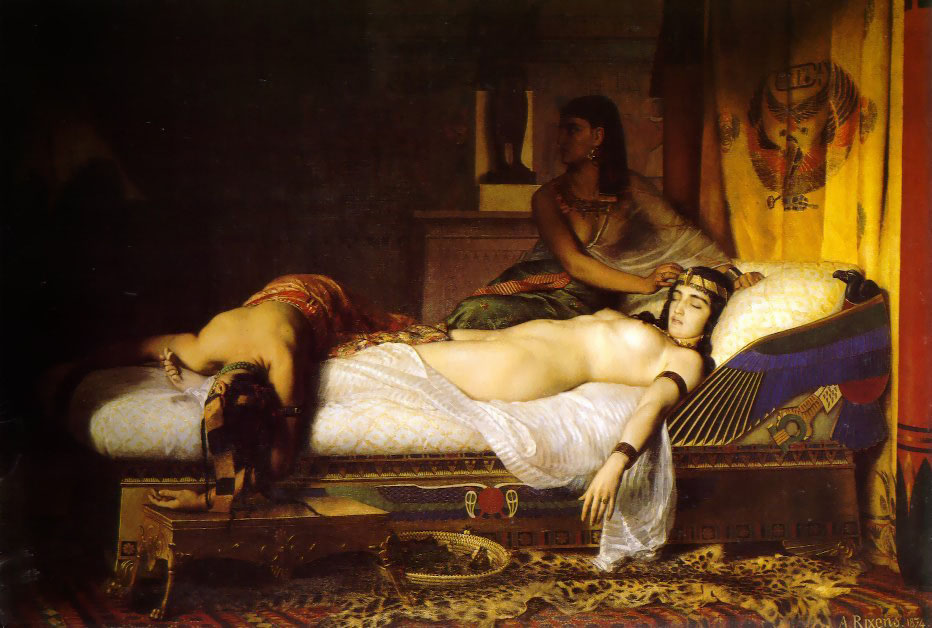
The Death of Cleopatra, 1874, Musée des Augustins (Toulouse)

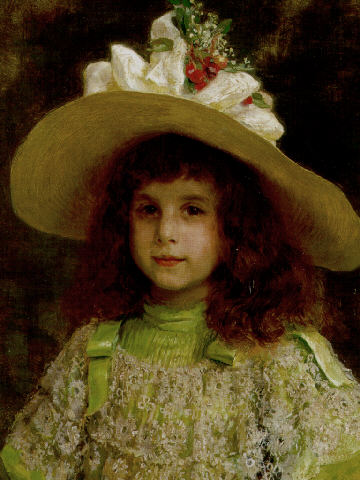
Portrait of a young girl, 1892

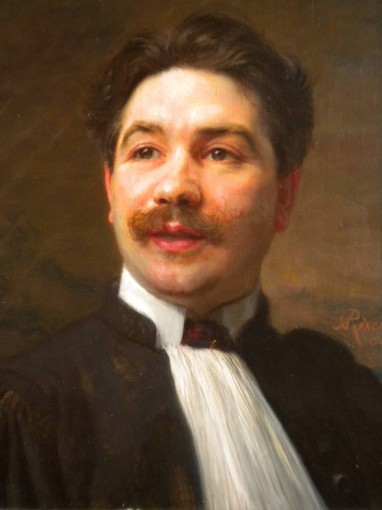
Portrait of the painter Georges-Paul Manceau

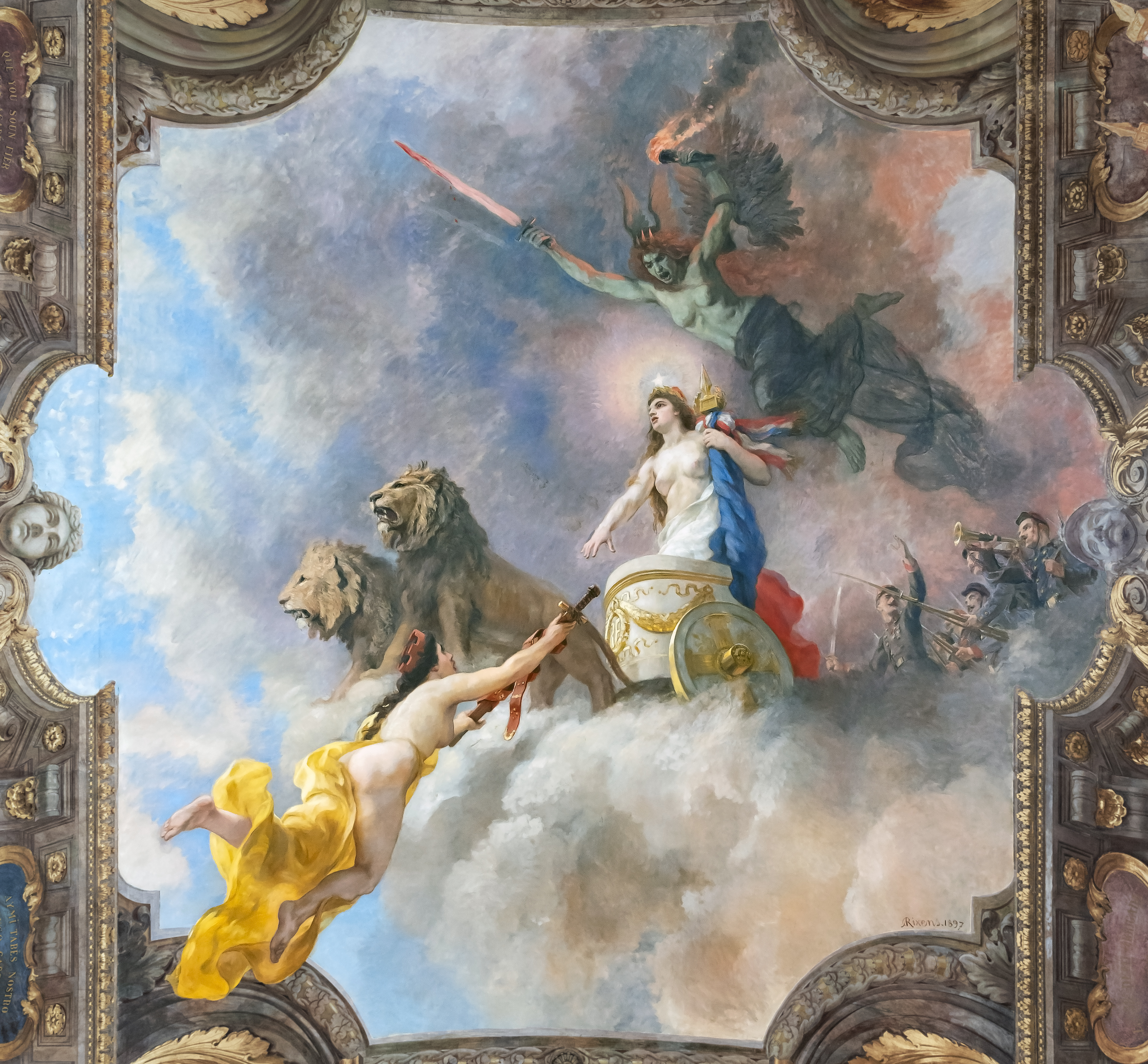
Ceiling of Capitole de Toulouse

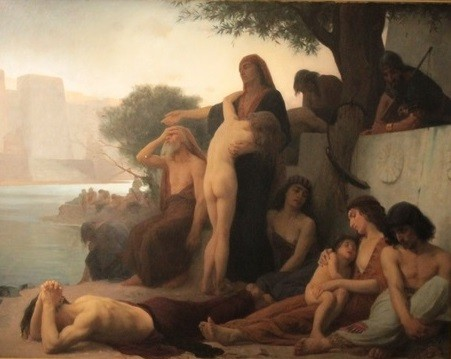
La captivité des juifs à Babylone, 1873

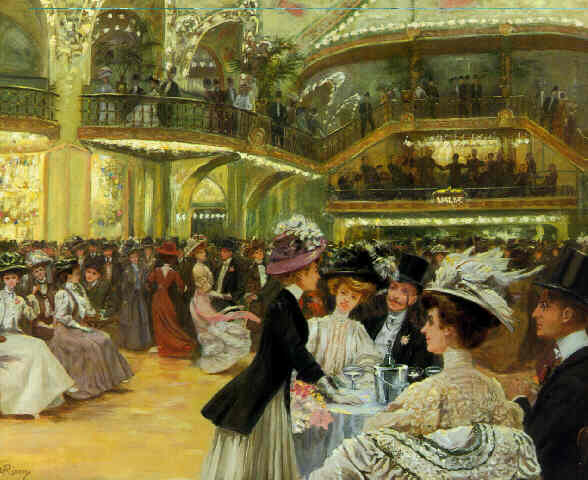
Le Bal du Moulin Rouge, c. 1900
