= List of cultural depictions of Cleopatra =

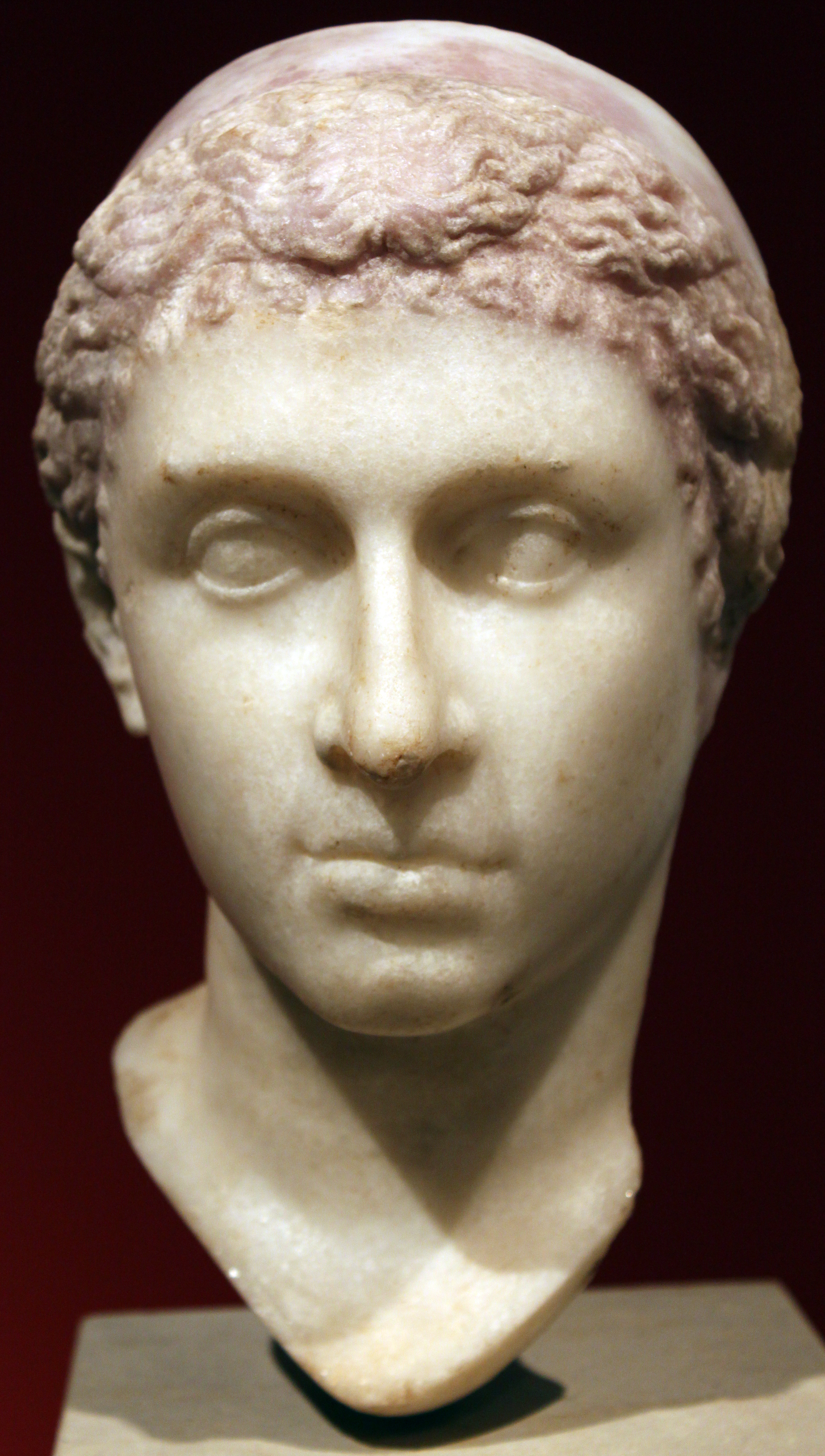
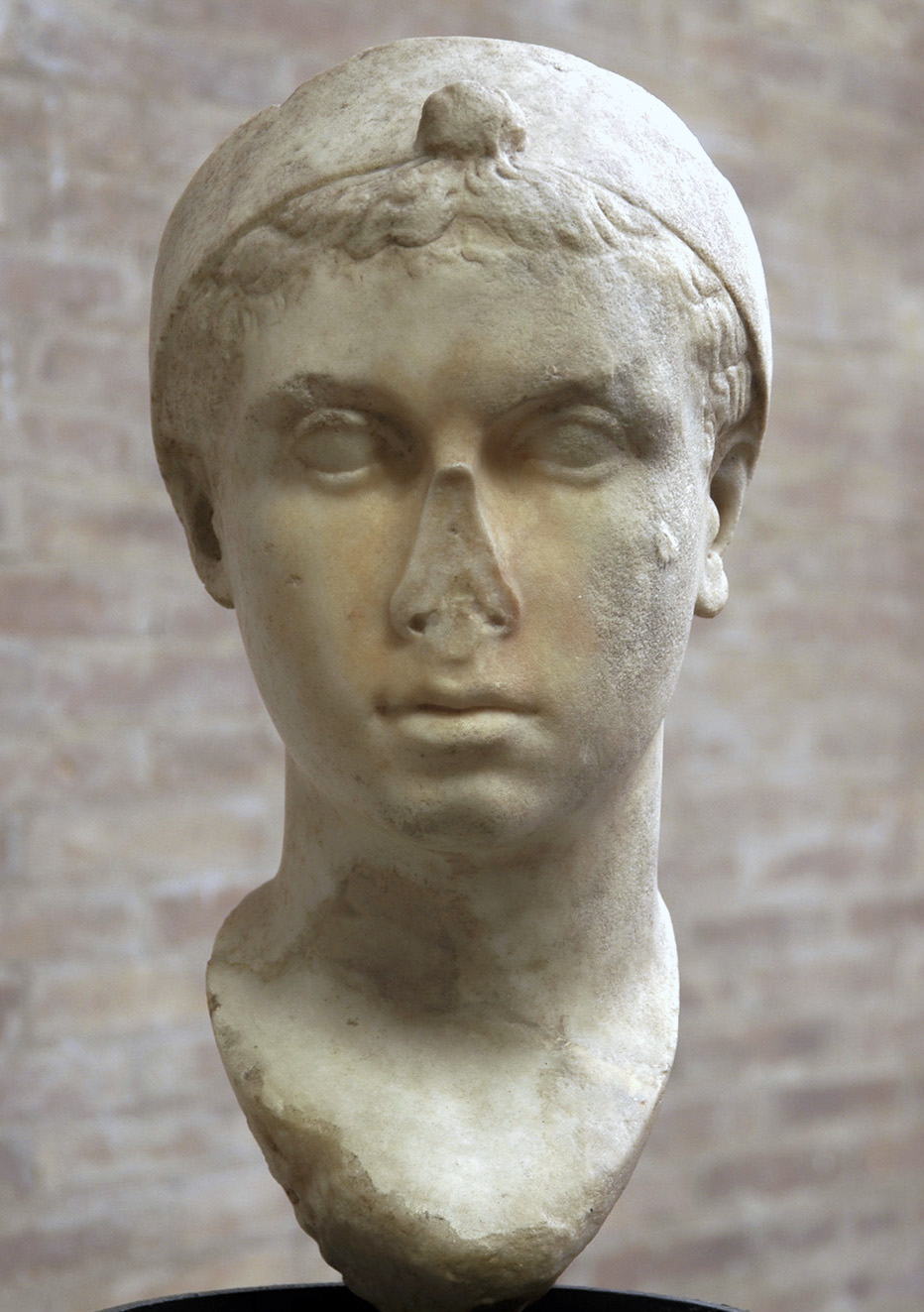
Left image: Cleopatra VII bust in the Altes Museum, Antikensammlung Berlin, Roman artwork, 1st century BC
Right: bust of Cleopatra VII, dated 40–30 BC, Vatican Museums, showing her with a 'melon' hairstyle and Hellenistic royal diadem worn over her head

Cleopatra has frequently been the subject of literature, films, plays, television programs, and art. Only those with Wikipedia articles are cited.

== Advertising ==
- Kimberly-Clark: 2010 TV campaign for Poise adult underwear with Whoopi Goldberg as Cleopatra
- Doctor's Associates: Subway 2010 "Five Dollar Foot Long" TV campaign with Ewa Da Cruz as Cleopatra
- Fleet Laboratories: 2011 Summer's Eve TV campaign
- ooVoo: "Arcana Academy" campaign

== Art ==
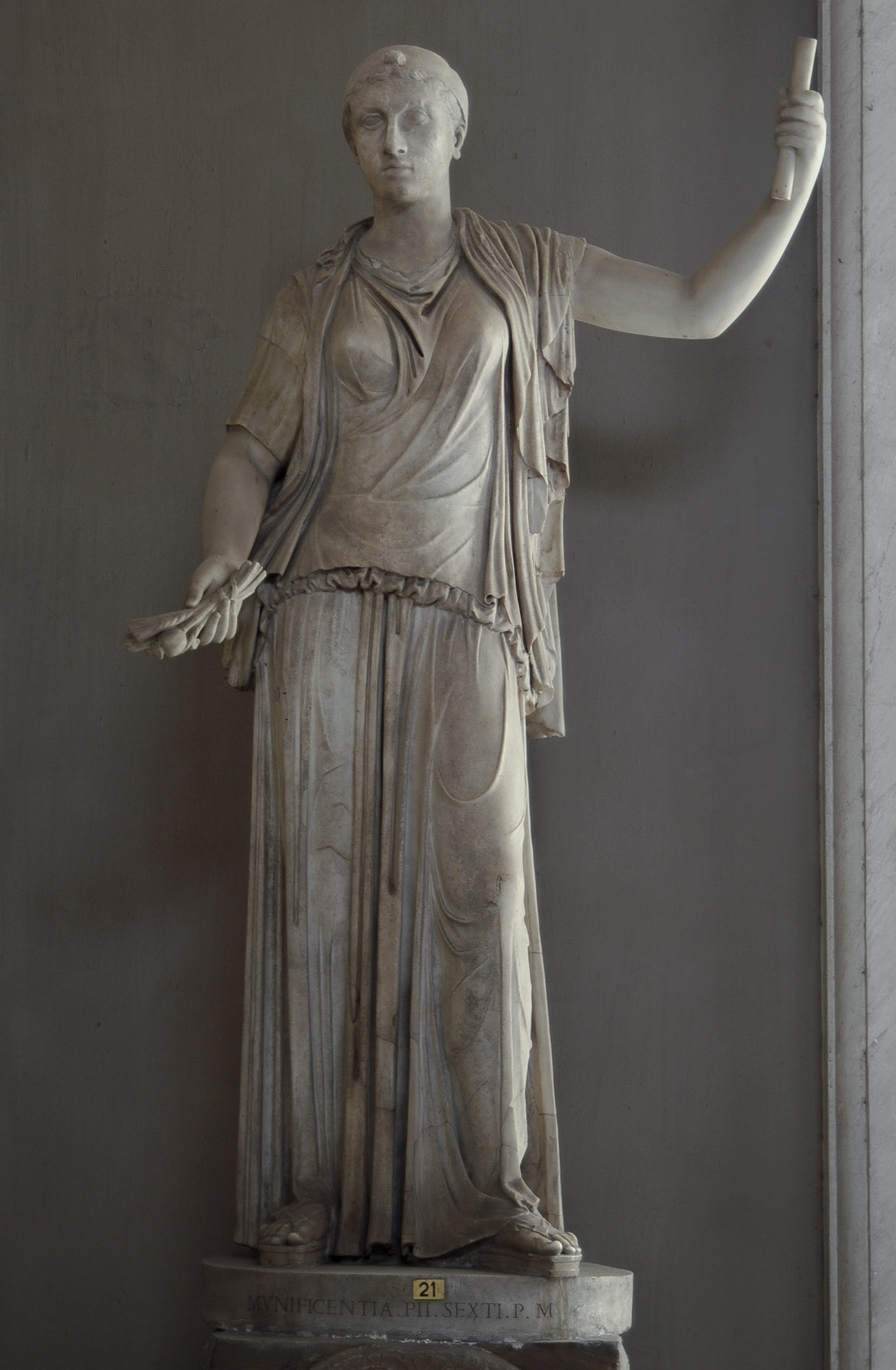
Cleopatra VII wearing a diadem and 'melon' hairstyle similar to coinage portraits, marble, found near the Tomba di Nerone, Rome along the Via Cassia, Museo Pio-Clementino, Vatican Museums

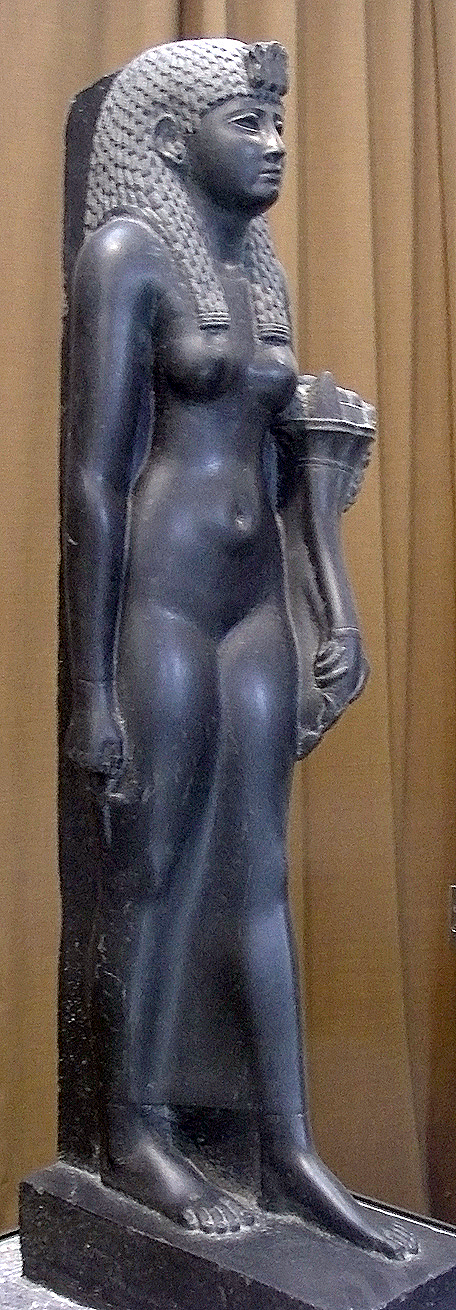
Cleopatra as a Goddess; 1st century BC

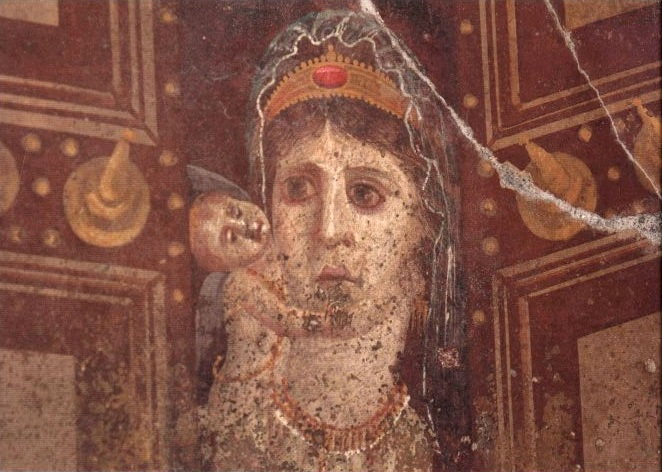
An ancient Roman wall painting in Room 71 of the House of Marcus Fabius Rufus at Pompeii, Italy, showing Venus with a cupid's arms wrapped around her. It is most likely a depiction of Cleopatra VII of Ptolemaic Egypt as Venus Genetrix, with her son Caesarion as a cupid. It was most likely painted in conjunction with the September 46 BC foundation of the Temple of Venus Genetrix in the Forum of Caesar by Julius Caesar, where he erected a gilded statue depicting Queen Cleopatra (as described by Appian and Dio Cassius).

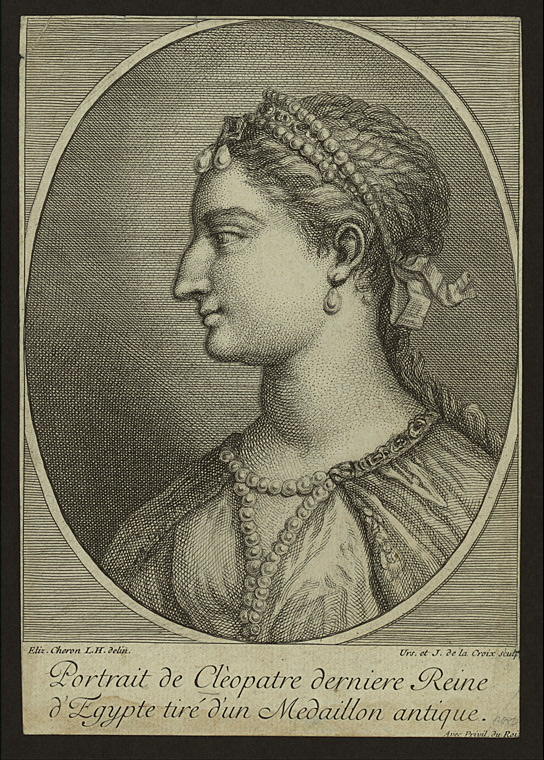
An engraving depicting Cleopatra VII by French artist Élisabeth Sophie Chéron (1648–1711), based on a medallion of Cleopatra dated to the Hellenistic period of antiquity

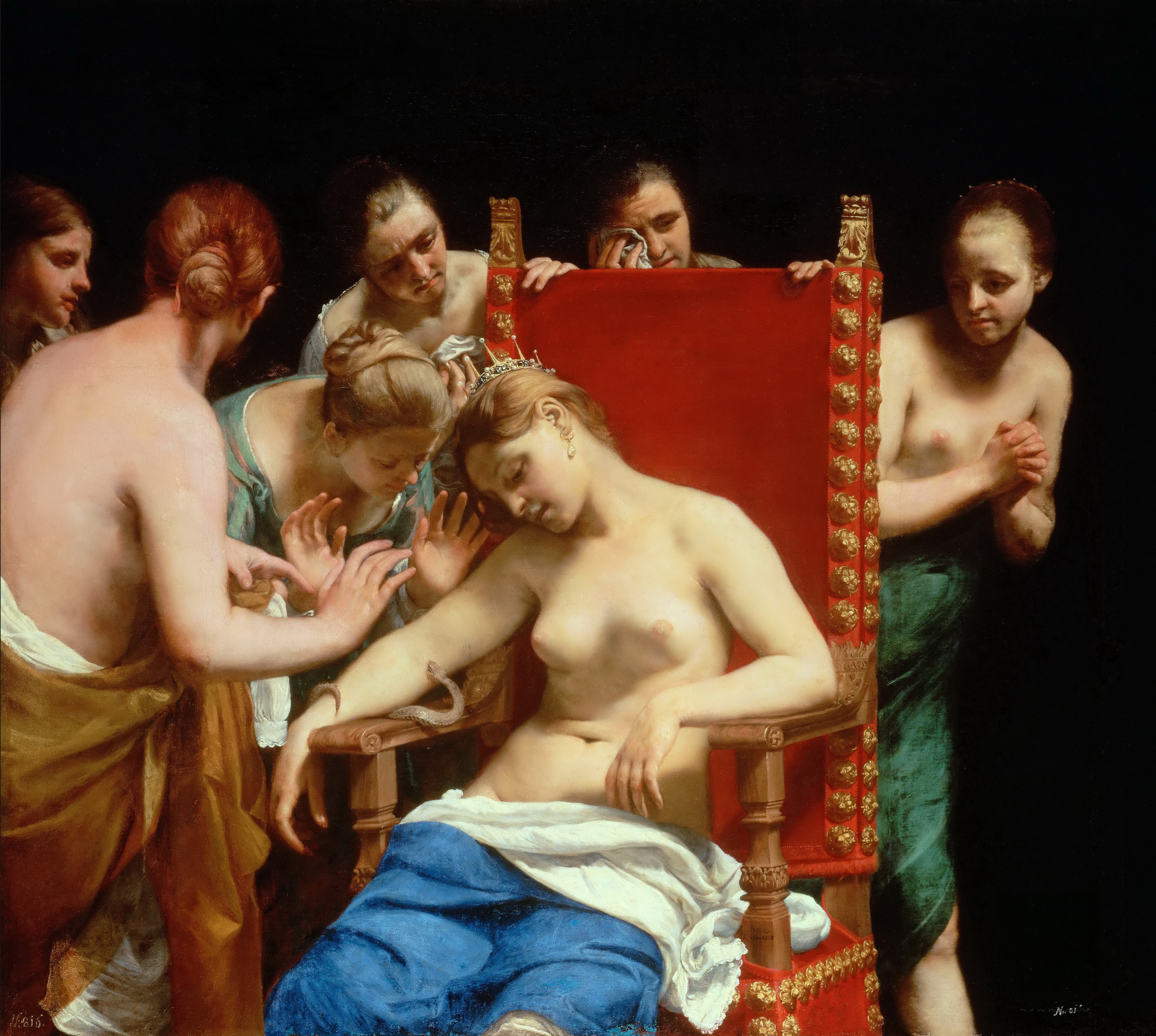
La morte di Cleopatra by Cagnacci

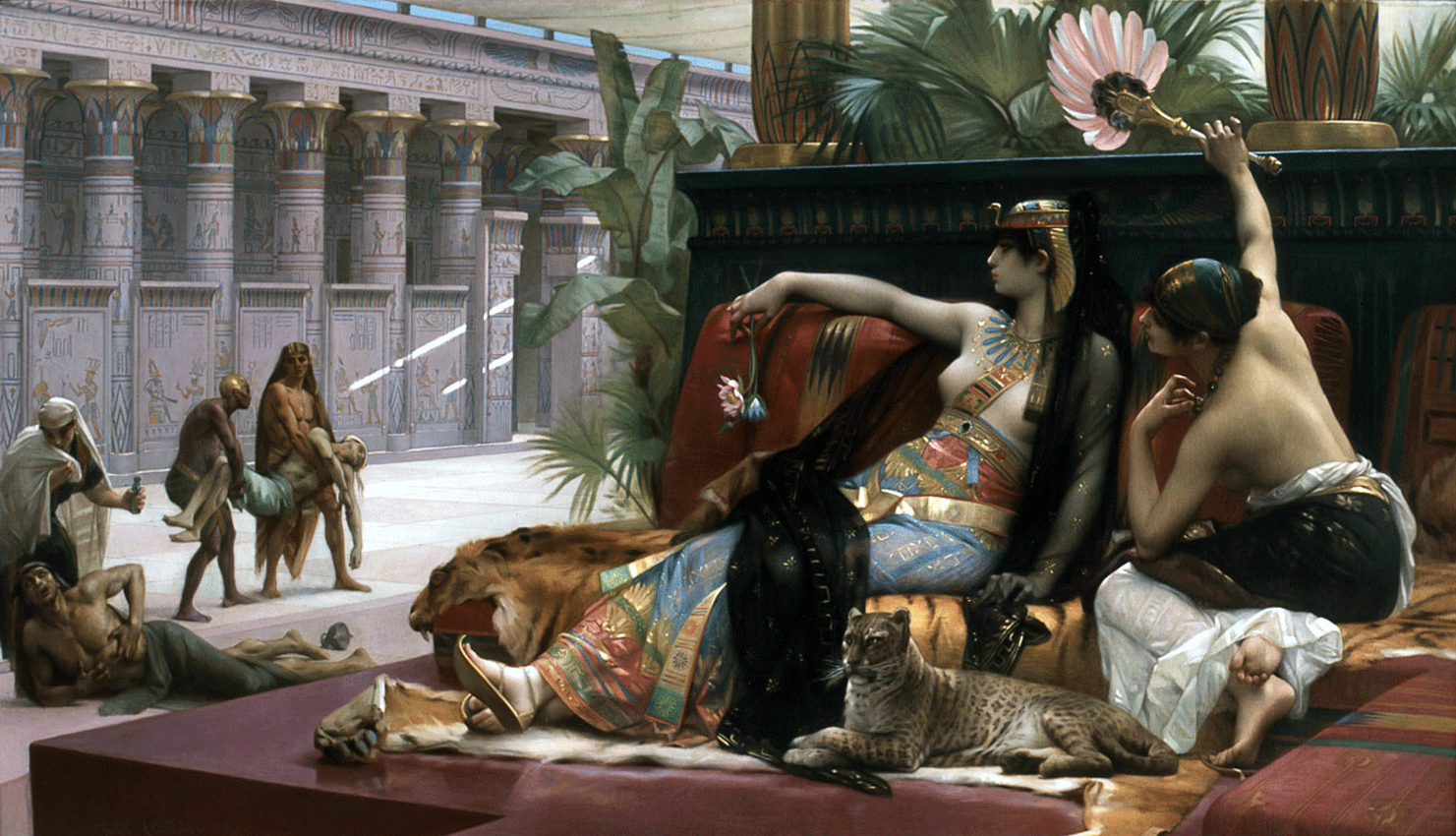
Cleopatra Testing Poisons on Condemned Prisoners by Alexandre Cabanel (1887).

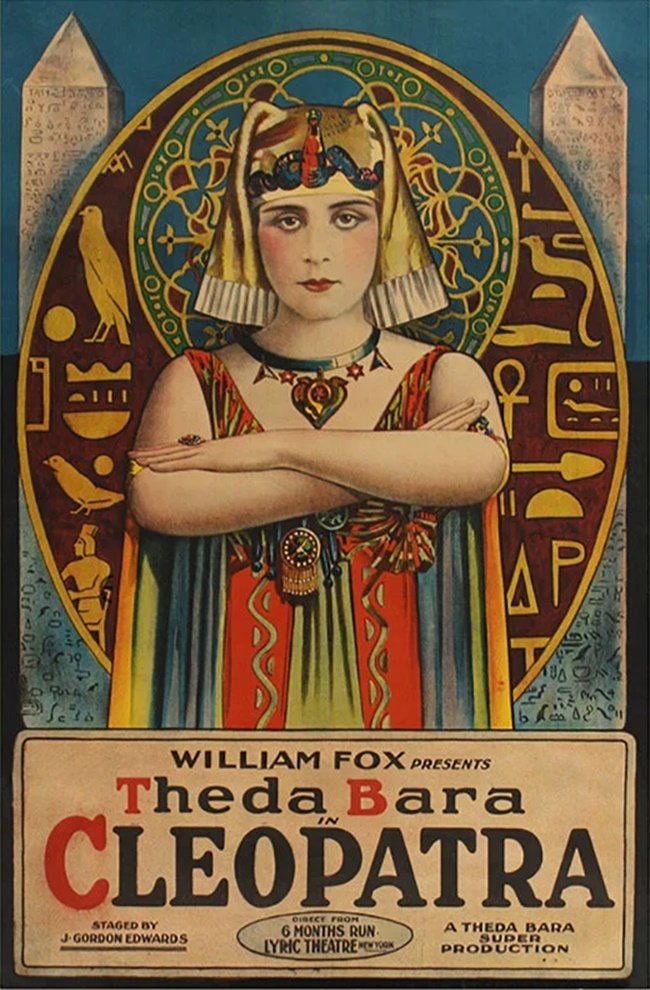
Poster for the film Cleopatra (1917), starring Theda Bara

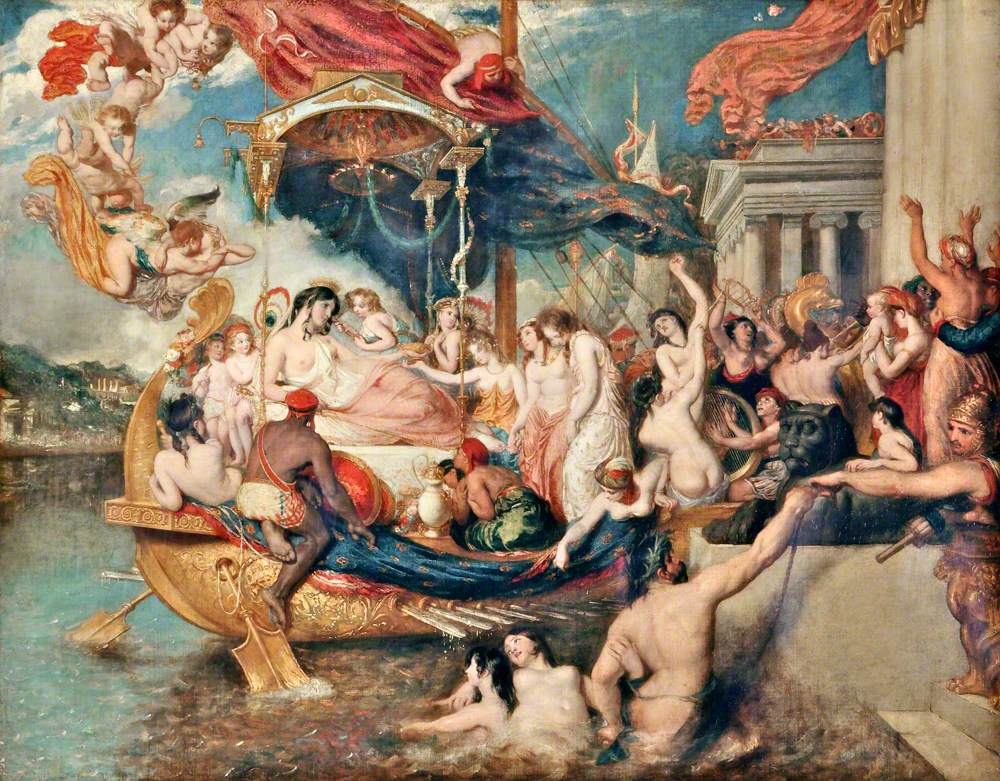
The Triumph of Cleopatra, by William Etty, 1821, now in the Lady Lever Art Gallery, Port Sunlight

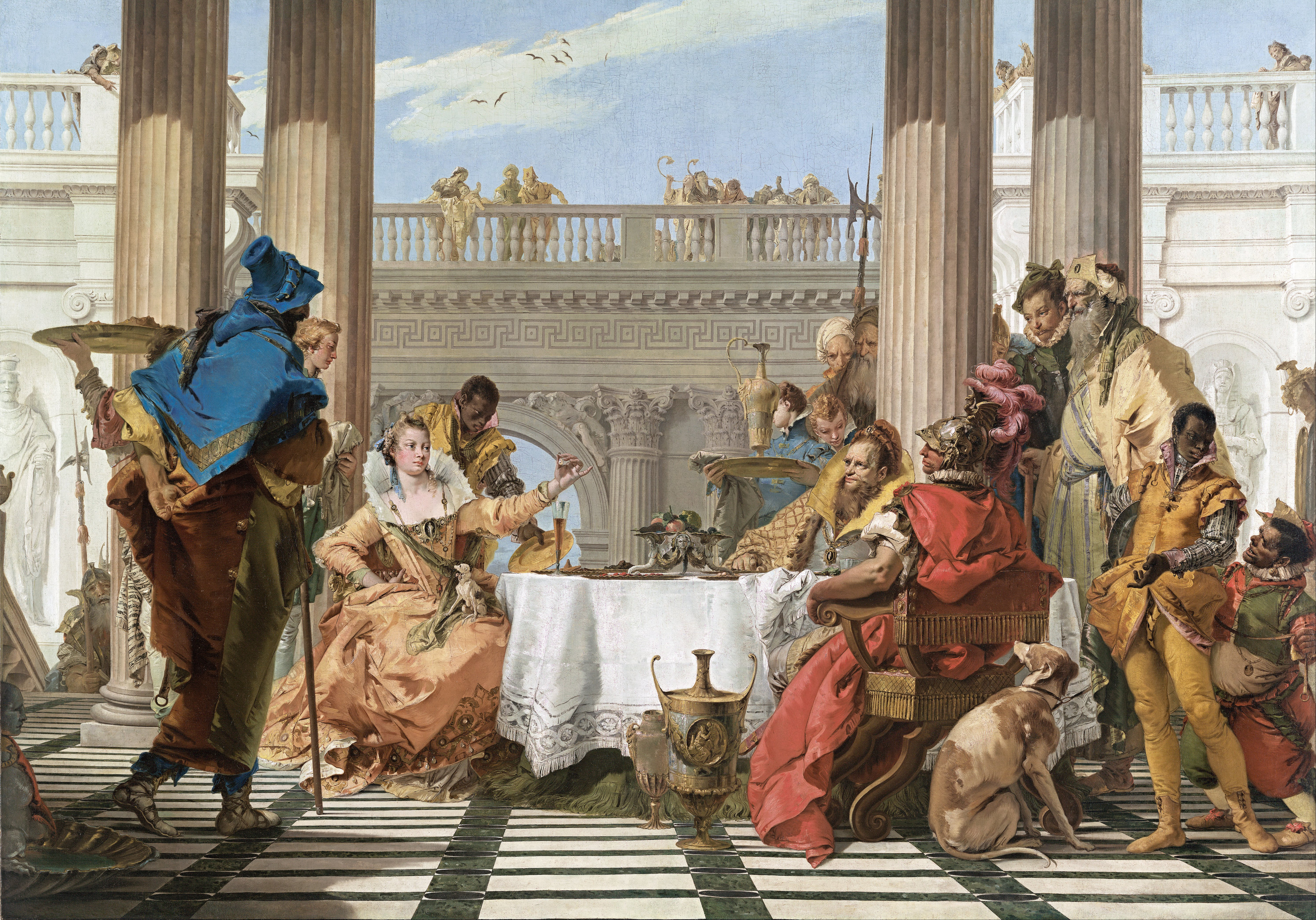
The Banquet of Cleopatra, by Giovanni Battista Tiepolo, 1744, National Gallery of Victoria, MelbourneThe Banquet of Cleopatra was a frequently used subject in art, mainly of the Baroque period.

- Arnaud Courlet de Vregille: Le Grand Voyage (2011)
- Robert K. Abbett: cover of Cleopatra (1962)
- Lawrence Alma-Tadema: Cleopatra (1875)
  - The Meeting of Antony and Cleopatra (1883)
- Ivan Argunov: Умирающая Клеопатра (1749)
- Francesco Xanto Avelli: Marco Antonio e Cleopatra (1542)
- Gillian Ayres: Antony and Cleopatra (1982)
- Bartolommeo Bandinelli: Cleopatra
- Francesco Baratta: Cleopatra
- François Barois: Cléopâtre mourant (1700)
- Pompeo Batoni: Cleopatra e Marco Antonio morente (1763)
- Hans Sebald Beham: Der tod der Kleopatra (1529)
- Gyula Benczúr: Kleopátra (1911)
- Claude Bertin: Cléopâtre se suicide (c. 1697)
- Jacques Blanchard: La mort de Cléopâtra (c. 1620)
- Arnold Böcklin Kleopatra (1872)
- Pier Jacopo Alari Bonacolsi Cleopatra (1519–1522)
- Boucicaut Master: Cléopâtre est présentée avec la tête et membres de son propre enfant (c. 1415)
  - Le tombeau de Marc Antony et de Cléopâtre (c. 1415)
- Frederick Arthur Bridgman: Cleopatra on the Terraces of Philae (1896)
  - Cleopatra's Barge
- Frank Brunner: Cleopatra (1976)
- Winifred Brunton: Queen Cleopatra VII
- Alexandre Cabanel: Cléopatre essayant des poisons sur des condangés à mort (1887)
- Guido Cagnacci: La morte di Cleopatra (1658)
  - La morte di Cleopatra (1660)
- Denis Calvaert: De dood van Cleopatra (1590)
- Andrea Casali: Antonio e Cleopatra
- André Castaigne: Antoine et Cléopâtre (1911)
- Chelsea Porcelain: The Death of Cleopatra (1760)
- Demetre Chiparus: Cleopatra (c. 1925)
- Giovanni Battista Cipriani: Cleopatra after Benvenuto Cellini
- Auguste Clésinger: Cléopâtre
- Henry Clive, Cleopatra (1929) (1946)
- John Collier: The Death of Cleopatra (1890)
- Michel Corneille Cléopâtre et l'aspic (1650–1660)
- Donato Creti: Cleopatra (1710)
- Pietro da Cortona: Caesar Placing Cleopatra Back on the Throne of Egypt ("Cesare rimette Cleopatra sul trono d'Egitto") (1637)
- Salvador Dalí: Cesare y Cleopatra (1972)
  - La muerte de Cleopatra (1975)
  - Les Amoureux Antoine et Cléopâtre (1979)
- Leonardo da Pistoia: Cleopatra
- George and Edward Dalziel: Cleopatra (1864) after Frederick Sandys
- Jacopo de' Barbari: Cleopatra (c. 1508)
- Jan de Bray: Het banket van Marcus Antonius en Cleopatra (1669)
- Eugène Delacroix: Cléopâtre et le paysan (1838)
- Gerard de Lairesse: La banquet de Cléopâtre (1680)
- Jean François de Troy: La mort de Cléopâtre
- Archie Dickens: Cleopatra (1990)
- Erté: cover for the February 1927 Harper's Bazaar
- Thomas Francis Dicksee: Cleopatra (1876)
- Piero di Cosimo: Cleopatra (1485–1490)
- Domenichino: La morte di Cleopatra
- Jean-Bernard Duvivier: Cléopâtre (1789)
- Edward Mason Eggleston: Cleopatra (1934)

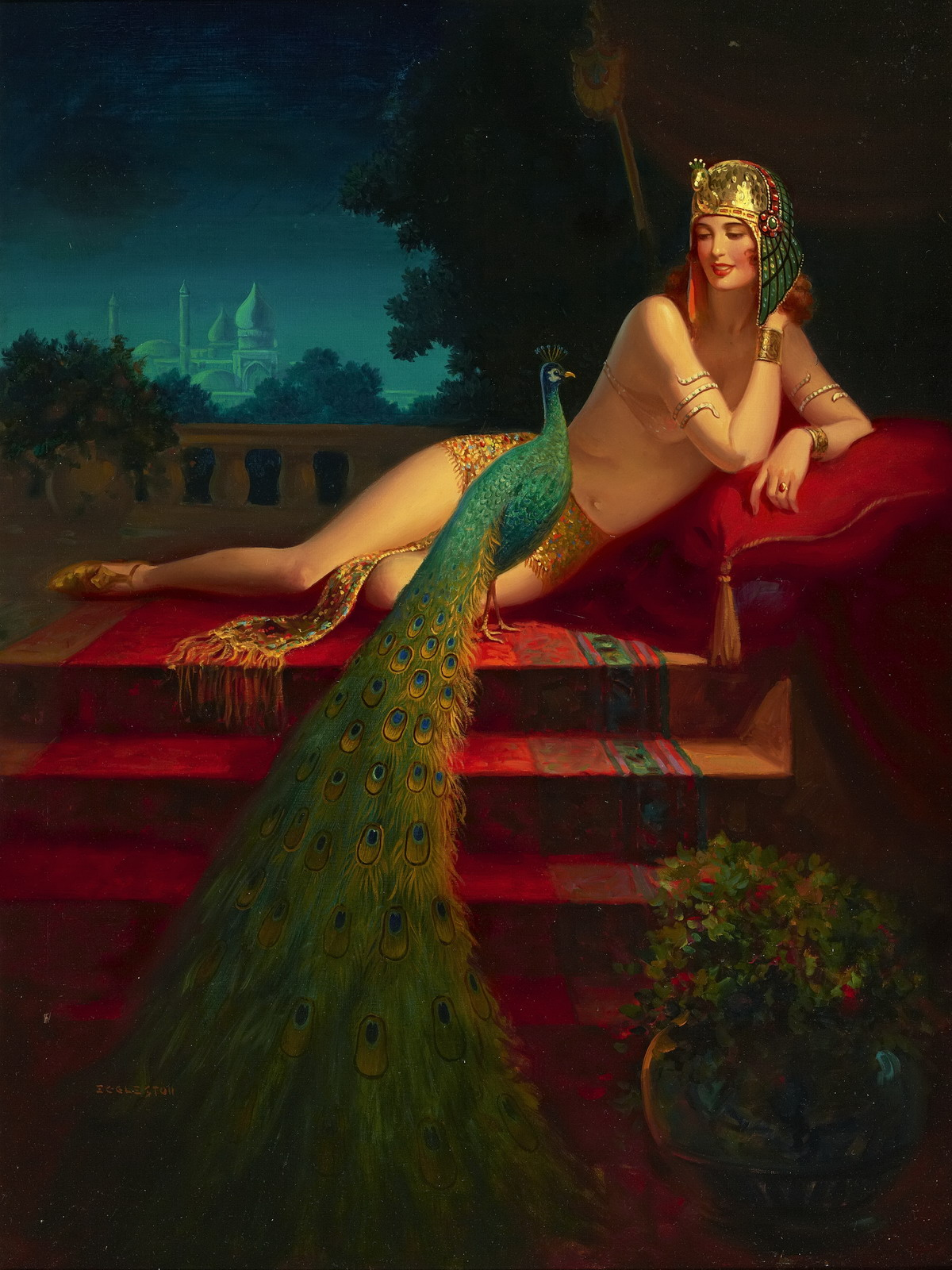
Cleopatra, 1934 calendar art by Edward M. Eggleston.

- Adrian Feint: Anthony and Cleopatra
- Harrison Fisher: Cleopatra (1907)
- Lavinia Fontana: Cleopatra (1585)
- Elisabeth Frink: Anthony and Cleopatra (1982), modeled by Helen Mirren and Michael Gambon
- Felice Ficherelli: La morte di Cleopatra (1650)
  - Scene dalla vita di Cleopatra silver basin (1620–1625) after Bernardo Strozzi
- Margaret Foley: Cleopatra
- Giacomo Francia: Cleopatra
- Francesco Furini: La morte di Cleopatra
- Louis Gauffier: Cléopâtre et Octavian (1788)
- Cesare Gennari: Cleopatra (1663)
- Artemisia Gentileschi: Cleopatra (1621–1622)
  - Cleopatra (1630)
- Orazio Gentileschi: Cleopatra
- Jean-Léon Gérôme: Cléopâtre et César (1866)
- Giampietrino: Cleopatra (c. 1525)
  - La morte di Cleopatra (c. 1530)
- Achille Glisenti: La morte di Cleopatra (1878)
- Luca Giordano: Cleopatra (c. 1700)
- Pierre Gobert: La Duchesse du Maine en Cléopâtre
- Thomas Ridgeway Gould: Cleopatra (1873)
- Guercino: Il suicidio di Cleopatra (1621)
  - La Cleopatra morente (c. 1648)
- Gavin Hamilton: The Death of Cleopatra (1767)
- Augustin Hirschvogel: Der tod der Kleopatra
- Gerard Hoet: Het Feest van Cleopatra
- Howard David Johnson: Cleopatra, Queen of Egypt
- Jacob Jordaens: Het Feest van Cleopatra (1653)
- Louis-Jean-François Lagrenée: La mort de Cléopâtre
- Giovanni Lanfranco: Il suicidio di Cleopatra (1632–1633)
- Gregorio Lazzarini: Cleopatra o allegoria della Prudenza
- Edmonia Lewis: The Death of Cleopatra (1876)
- Johann Liss: Der tod der Kleopatra (1622–1624)
- Claude Lorrain: Le débarquement de Cléopâtre à Tarse (1642–1643)
- Juan Luna: La muerte de Cleopatra (1881)
- Angelica Kauffman: Cleopatra
- Hans Makart: Der tod der Kleopatra (1875)
  - Die Niljagd der Kleopatra (1883–1884)
- Carlo Maratta: Cleopatra e la perla (1650)
- Jan Matsys: Cleopatra (c. 1565)
- Luigi Mayer Baths of Cleopatra at Alexandria (1802), commissioned by Sir Robert Ainslie, 1st Baronet
- Giuseppe Mazzuoli: La morte di Cleopatra (c. 1713)
- Sebastiano Mazzoni: La morte di Cleopatra
  - Il Banchetto di Cleopatra (1660)
- Angus McBride: Antony and Cleopatra (1973)
- Anton Raphael Mengs: Augustus und Kleopatra (1761)
- Michelangelo: Cleopatra (1533–1534)
- Pierre Mignard: La mort de Cléopâtre (1670)
- Gustave Moreau: Cléopâtre (c. 1887)
- Caspar Netscher: De dood van Cleopatra (1673)
- Terese Nielsen: Cleopatra
- Theodor Pallady: Cleopatra
- Michael Parkes: Cleopatra (1990)
- Maxfield Parrish: Cleopatra (1917)
- Gianfrancesco Penni: La morte di Cleopatra
- Johann Georg Platzer: Antonius und Kleopatra in der Schlacht bei Actium (c. 1750)
  - Das Gastmal der Kleopatra (1750)
- Valentine Cameron Prinsep: The Death of Cleopatra
- Domenico Puligo: La morte di Cleopatra (c. 1525)
- Marcantonio Raimondi: La morte di Cleopatra (1520–1525)
- Jean-Baptiste Regnault: La mort de Cléopâtre (1796–1799)
- Rembrandt: Studie van een naakt vrouw als Cleopatra (c. 1637)
- Guido Reni: Cleopatra con l'aspide (1630)
  - Cleopatra (1635–1640)
- Pietro Ricchi: La morte di Cleopatra (c. 1670)
- Sebastiano Ricci: La morte di Cleopatra
- Domenico Riccio: Il suicidio di Cleopatra (1552)
- Antoine Rivalz: La mort de Cléopâtre
- Jean-André Rixens: La mort de Cléopâtre (1874)
- Girolamo Romani: La morte di Cleopatra lunette (1531–1532)
- Mimmo Rotella: Cleopatra
- Peter Paul Rubens: Cleopatra (1615)
- School of Fontainebleau: Cléopâtre
  - Cléopâtre (1754)
- Eliza Sharpe: Cleopatra
- Elisabetta Sirani: Cleopatra
- Andrea Solari: Cleopatra
- Leonello Spada: La morte di Cleopatra
- Pierre Gustave Eugene Staal: Cleopatra (1858), from Mary Cowden Clarke's World Noted Women
- Massimo Stanzione: Cleopatra (1630)
- William Wetmore Story: Cleopatra (1869)
- Jean-Joseph Taillasson: Cléopâtre découvert par Rodogune d'avoir empoisonné la coupe nuptial (1791)
- Giovanni Battista Tiepolo painted several works and cycles on Anthony and Cleopatra. The Banquet of Cleopatra (1744) is in Melbourne, Australia. Tiepolo returned to the subject a few years later in a scene in his fresco cycle on Anthony and Cleopatra in the Palazzo Labia in Venice. A further large oil Tiepolo version is paired with a Meeting of Cleopatra and Mark Anthony. This is in Arkhangelskoye Palace near Moscow (1747, 338 x 600 cm). There are several oil sketch modelli and drawings.
- Timotheus: Queen Cleopatra
- Michele Tosini: Cleopatra
- Francesco Trevisani: Il banchetto di Marco Antonio (1702)
- Henry Tresham: In the Palace in Alexandria (1795), published by the Boydell Shakespeare Gallery dramatizing Antony and Cleopatra
- Alessandro Turchi: La morte di Antonio e Cleopatra (1630–1635)
  - La morte di Cleopatra (1640)
- Anthony van Dyck: Death of Cleopatra VII
- Justus van Egmont: Het verhaal van Marcus Antonius en Cleopatra (1677)
  - Het verhaal van Caesar en Cleopatra (1680) tapestry
- Willem van Mieris: De dood van Cleopatra (1694)
- Jan van Scorel: De stervende Cleopatra (c. 1523)
- Alessandro Varotari: Cleopatra
- Vecchietta: Antonio e Cleopatra
- Claude Vignon: Cléopâtre se donnant la mort (c. 1640)
- Vincent of Beauvais: "Les suicides d'Antoine et Cléopâtre" from Le Miroir Historial
- John William Waterhouse: Cleopatra (1888)
- Richard Caton Woodville: Cleopatra
  - The Death of Cleopatra (1889) for The Illustrated London News

== Astronomy ==
- Johann Palisa named 216 Kleopatra after Cleopatra

== Ballet ==
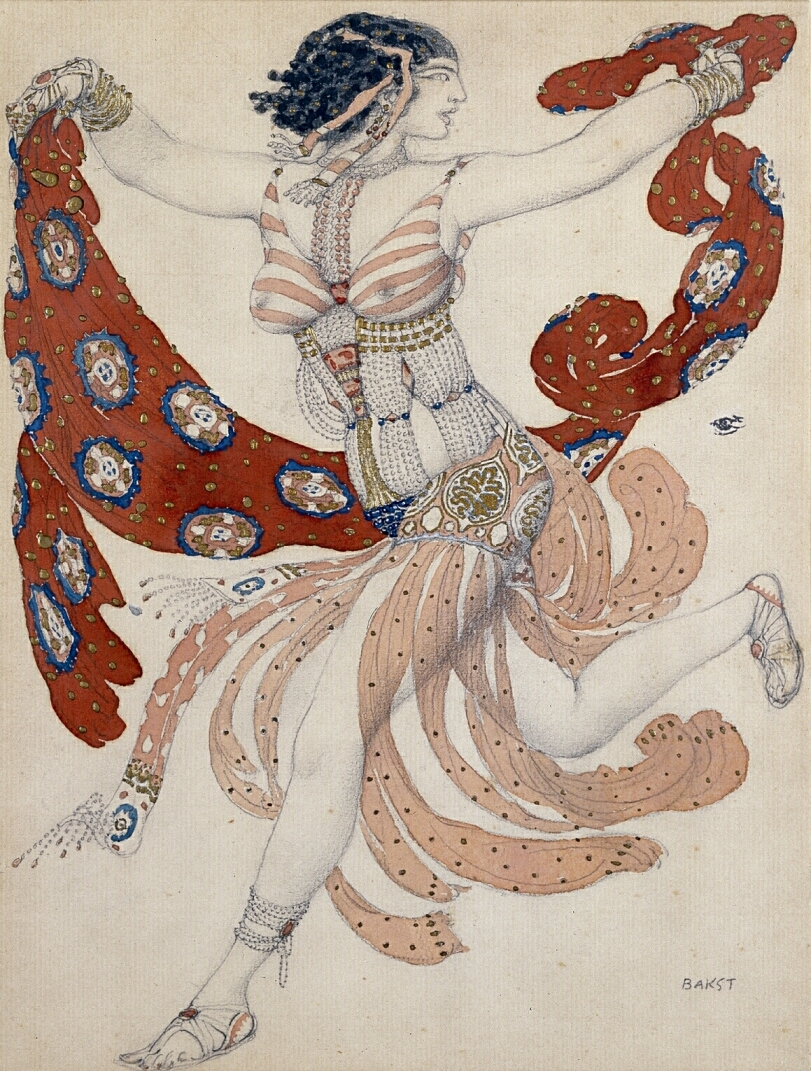
The 1909 Cléopâtre costume designed by Léon Bakst for Ida Rubinstein.

- Jean-Pierre Aumer and Rodolphe Kreutzer: Antony et Cléopâtre (1808)
- Michel Fokine and Anton Arensky: Nuit d'Egypte (1908)
  - restaged as Cléopâtre (1909) by Sergei Diaghilev, starring Ida Rubinstein, costumed by Léon Bakst
- Martha Graham and Halim El-Dabh: One More Gaudy Night (1961)
- David Nixon and Claude-Michel Schönberg: Cleopatra (2011) for the Northern Ballet
- Jean-Georges Noverre: Antony et Cléopâtre (1765)
- Ben Stevenson: Cleopatra (2000) for the Houston Ballet

== Beauty and fashion ==
- Colgate-Palmolive: Cleopatra line of beauty cream, soap and lotions

== Celebrities ==
- Marilyn Monroe posed as Cleopatra based on Theda Bara's portrayal for the December 22, 1958 Life, shot by Richard Avedon
- Sandra Bernhard posed as Cleopatra for the August 1989 cover of Spy
- Kim Kardashian posed as Cleopatra based on Elizabeth Taylor's portrayal for the March 2011 Harper's Bazaar

== Comics ==
- Robert Bernstein: Tales of Suspense #44, Tony Stark follows The Mad Pharaoh to ancient Egypt, and aids Cleopatra
- Bret Blevins and Rick Remender: Legion of the Supernatural, #3
- Walter Crane: Sheba
- René Goscinny and Albert Uderzo: Cleopatra is a recurring character in the Asterix comic series, first appearing in Asterix and Cleopatra
- Don Marquis: Archy and Mehitabel
- Vicente Segrelles: Cleopatra
- Mike Maihack: Cleopatra in Space (2014)

== Documentaries ==
- Cleopatra's Palace (1998) (FilmRoos)
- The Great Egyptians: The Real Cleopatra (1998) (Tamsin Greig)
- Cleopatra: The First Woman of Power (1999) (Cinenova, narrated by Anjelica Huston)
- The Mysterious Death of Cleopatra (2004) (Atlantic Productions)
- Ancients Behaving Badly: Cleopatra (2009)
- Cleopatra, Portrait of a Killer (2009) (Camelia Ben Sakour)
- Rome's Greatest Battles: Actium (2010) (Laëtitia Eïdo)
- Kleopatra: mit Macht und Eros (2013) (ZDF)
- Egypt According To Cleopatra (2014) (De Agostini)
- A Timewatch Guide: Cleopatra (2015) (BBC)
- Cleopatra's Lost Tomb (2016) (Mentorn Barraclough Carey)
- Cleopatra: Mother, Mistress, Murderer, Queen (2016) (Channel 5)
- Truthseekers: Cleopatra (2022) (Big Media TV)
- Queen Cleopatra (2023) (Netflix)
- Ancient Empires: Cleopatra (2023) (History Channel)
- Ancient Autopsy: Cleopatra (2025) (Channel 4, presented by Suzannah Lipscomb)

== Educational cultural depictions ==
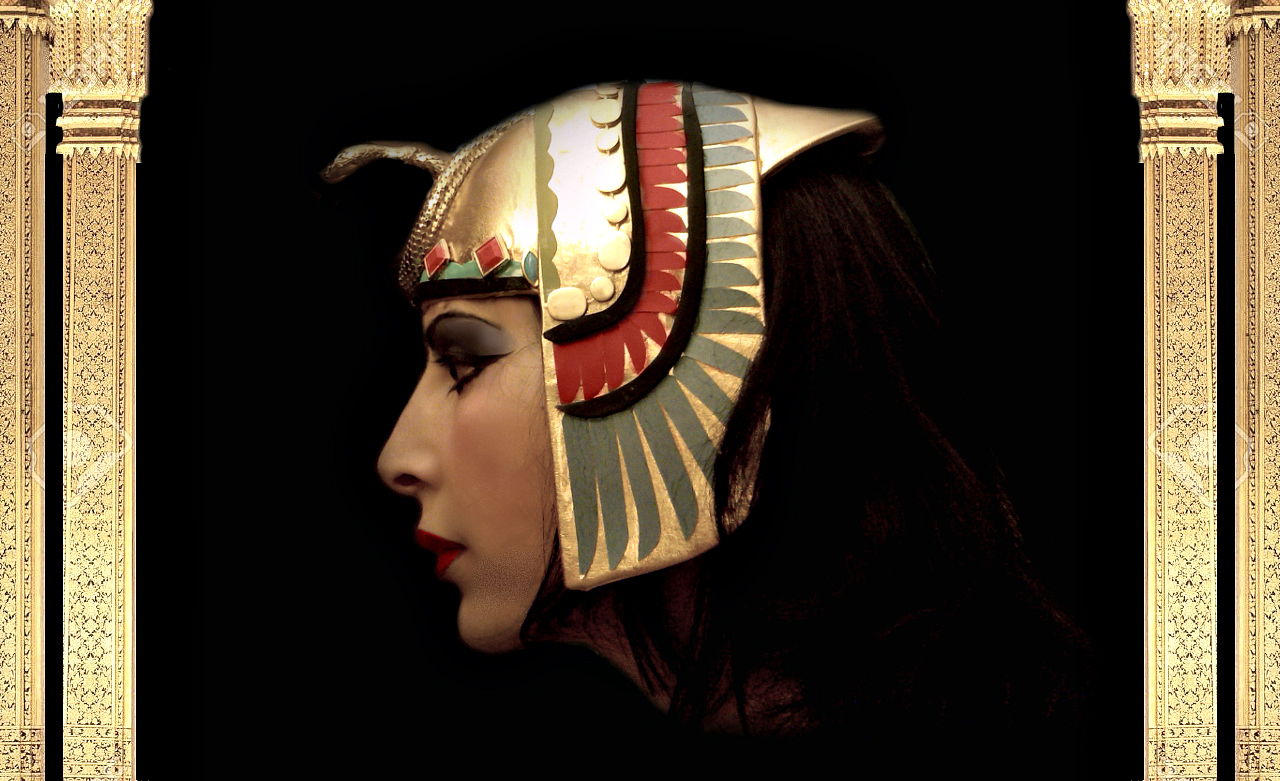
Layla Taj in Wings of Isis, part of Journey Down the Nile, performed under the auspices of The Egyptian Cultural Performing Arts Society

- Journey Down The Nile: a film, lecture, and cultural dance program, by Layla Taj

== Film ==
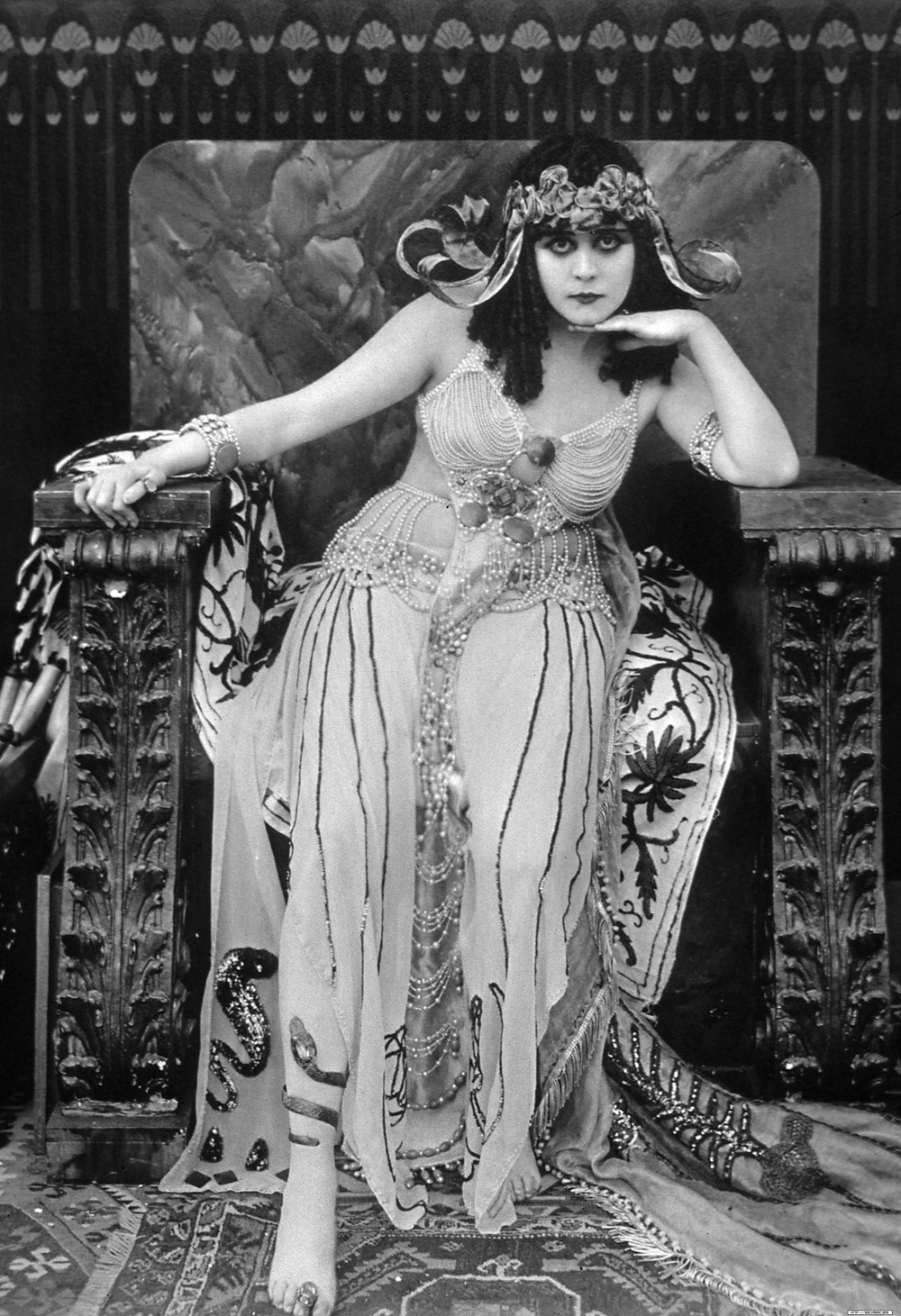
Theda Bara in Cleopatra (1917)

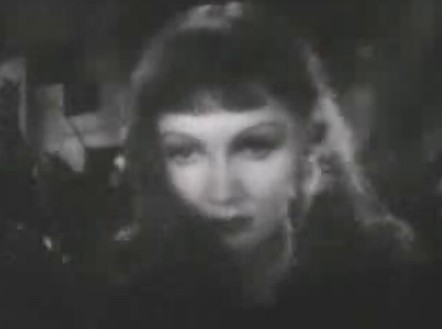
Claudette Colbert in Cleopatra (1934)

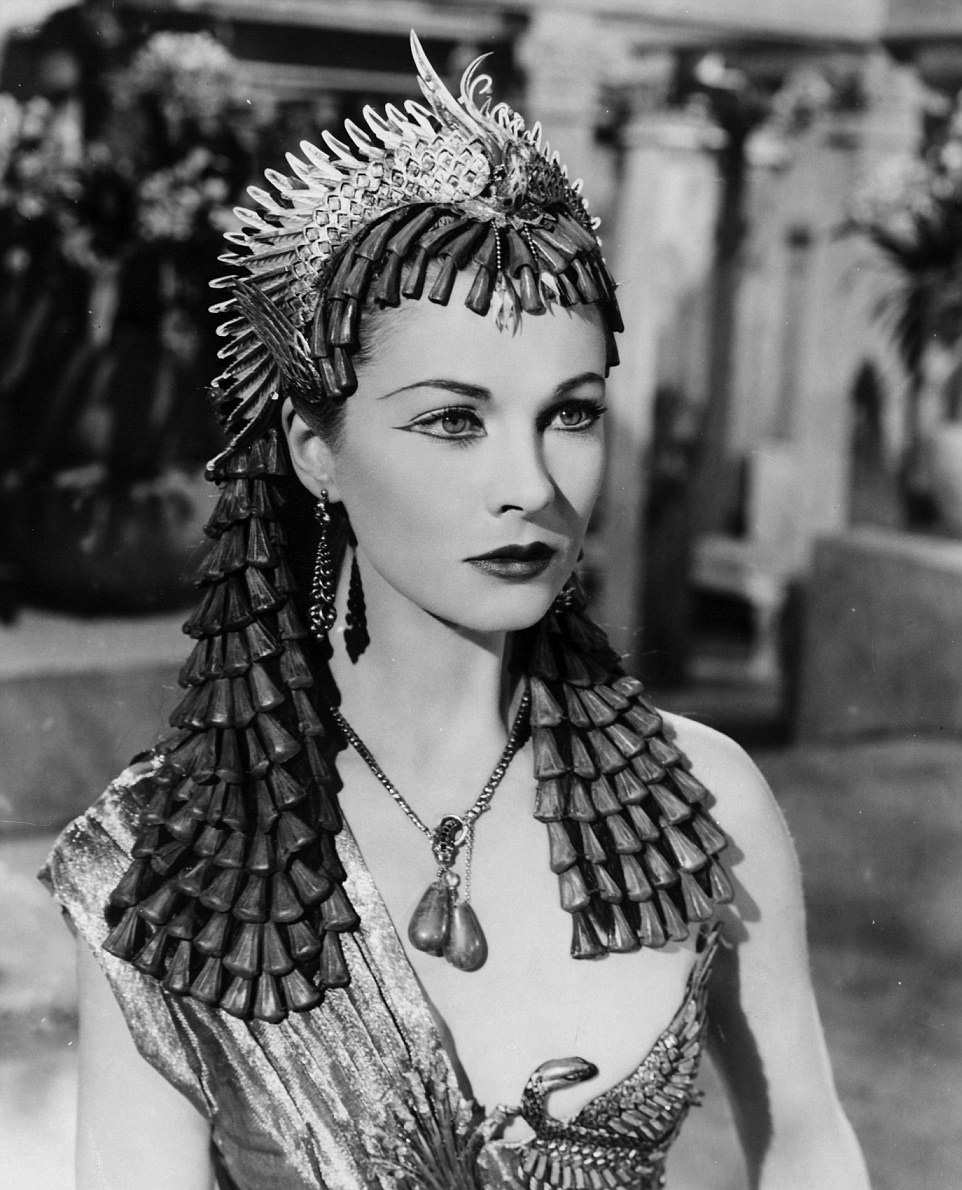
Vivien Leigh in Caesar and Cleopatra (1945)

Elizabeth Taylor in Cleopatra (1963)

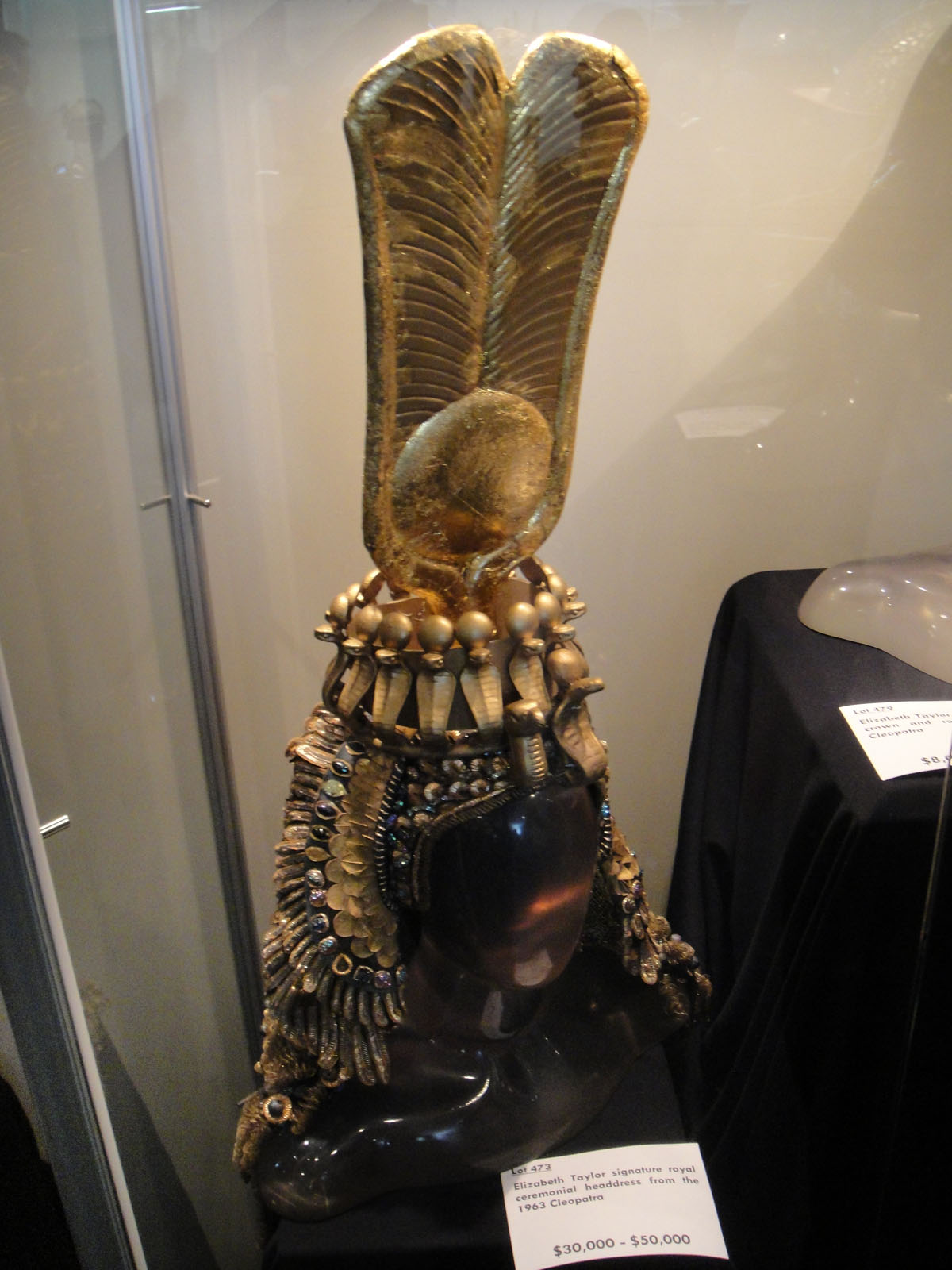
The headdress for Elizabeth Taylor in Cleopatra (1963). This film's costume design garnered an Oscar for Irene Sharaff.

- Cléopâtre (1899) (Jeanne d'Alcy)
- Antony and Cleopatra (1908) (Florence Lawrence)
- Cléopâtre (1910) (Madeleine Roch)
- Cleopatra, Queen of Egypt (1912) (Helen Gardner)
- Antony and Cleopatra (1913) (Gianna Terribili-Gonzales)
- Cleopatra (1917) (Theda Bara)
- Antony and Cleopatra (1924) (Ethel Teare)
- Cleopatra (1934) (Claudette Colbert)
- Dante's Inferno (1935) (Lorna Low)
- Cleopatra (1943) (Amina Rizk)
- Caesar and Cleopatra (1945) (Vivien Leigh)
- The Private Life of Mark Antony and Cleopatra (1947) (María Antonieta Pons)
- The Bishop's Wife (1947): Dudley states that Wutheridge's coin was struck by Julius Caesar to pay for Cleopatra's visit to Rome
- Serpent of the Nile (1953) (Rhonda Fleming)
- Due notti con Cleopatra (1954) (Sophia Loren)
- The Story of Mankind (1957) (Virginia Mayo)
- Legions of the Nile (1959) (Linda Cristal)
- A Queen for Caesar (1962) (Pascale Petit)
- Cleopatra (1963) (Elizabeth Taylor)
- Toto and Cleopatra (1963) (Magali Noël)
- Take Her, She's Mine (1963): Mollie and several other women at a costume party are dressed as Cleopatra
- Carry On Cleo (1964) (Amanda Barrie)
- Asterix and Cleopatra (1968) (Micheline Dax)
- Cleopatra (1970) (Chinatsu Nakayama)
- Cleopatra (1970) (Viva)
- Antony and Cleopatra (1972) (Hildegarde Neil)
- Highway to Hell (1992) (Amy Stiller)
- Cleopatra (1999) (Leonor Varela)
- Asterix & Obelix: Mission Cleopatra (2002) (Monica Bellucci)
- Scooby-Doo! in Where's My Mummy? (2005) (Virginia Madsen)
- Giulio Cesare (2006) (Danielle de Niese)
- Cleópatra (2007) (Alessandra Negrini)
- Cleopatra ya Lalla (2013) (Ihissane Atif)
- Asterix & Obelix: The Middle Kingdom (2023) (Marion Cotillard)

== Games ==
- Age of Empires: The Rise of Rome: The campaign in "Pax Romana: 1. Actium" has a history section that talks about Antony and Cleopatra falling in love, the navy battle in Egypt, and their downfall by suicide. The player must sink Cleopatra's barge in order to win the campaign.
- Anachronism Set 2 includes Cleopatra.
- Assassin's Creed II: In the backstory of the game, Cleopatra is included in a list of tyrannical rulers targeted by the assassins. She is killed by a female assassin named Amunet, who assassinates her using an asp to make the queen's death appear to be a suicide.
- Assassin's Creed Origins: Cleopatra plays a more active role in the story of this later entry to the franchise, first as an ally to the Hidden Ones, a predecessor to the Assassin Brotherhood, and later as an enemy along with Julius Caesar. Her killer Amunet, once known as Aya of Alexandria, also plays a major role as a leader of the Hidden Ones and ex-wife of the protagonist, Bayek of Siwa.
- BreakAway's and Impressions's Cleopatra: Queen of the Nile (2000)
- Double Dragon 3: The Rosetta Stone – Cleopatra appears as an end boss in the final level of the arcade game.
- Cleopatra and the Society of Architects
- Cleopatra Fortune
- Civilization II
- Civilization III
- Civilization VI
- Civilization Revolution
- Cleopatra is a playable character in the Mobile/PC Game Rise of Kingdoms.
- Dante's Inferno
- Fate/Grand Order: Cleopatra is an Assassin class servant. She is the antagonist of a Halloween event, where she wishes to reunite with Caesar and is dismayed to find that he has grown fat.
- Kheops Studio's Cleopatra: A Queen's Destiny (2007)
- Night at the Museum: Battle of the Smithsonian
- Scribblenauts and its sequels
- Shadow of Rome: Iris and Charmian, twins who appear throughout the game who employ the character Sextus and his gladiators, are implied to be working for Cleopatra, even though it is never confirmed.
- Total War: Rome II
- International Game Technology has a series of Cleopatra slot machines.

== Literature ==
- Plutarch: Life of Antony (c. 100)
- Dante Alighieri: Inferno (1321)
- Giovanni Boccaccio: "Cleopatrae, Aegypti Reginae" (from De mulieribus claris) (1362)
- François Rabelais: Cléopâtre dans l'Hadès (1553)
- Sarah Fielding: The Lives of Cleopatra and Octavia (1758)
- Théophile Gautier: Un Nuit de Cléopâtre (1838)
- Delphine de Girardin: Cléopâtre (1847)
- Charlotte Brontë: Villette (1853): Lucy is mortified at seeing a semi-nude painting of Cleopatra
- Jacob Abbott: Cleopatra (1879)
- Henry Gréville: Cléopâtre (1886)
- H. Rider Haggard: Cleopatra: Being an Account of the Fall and Vengeance of Harmachis (1889)
- Georg Ebers: Kleopatra (1894)
- E. Barrington (L. Adams Beck): The Laughing Queen (1927)
- Talbot Mundy: Queen Cleopatra (1929)
- Mary Butts: Scenes from the Life of Cleopatra (1935)
- Emil Ludwig: Kleopatra: Geschichte einer Königin (1937)
- Thornton Wilder: The Ides of March (1948)
- Jeffrey K. Gardner: Cleopatra (1962)
- Margaret Carver Leighton: Cleopatra: Sister of the Moon (1969)
- Ray Nelson: "Blake's Progress" (1975): an Alternate History - Cleopatra wins at Actium, leading to a future of a Greek-speaking, Isis-worshiping world civilization
- E. E. Y. Hales: Chariot of Fire (1977): Fantasy novel; sent to Hell after her death, Cleopatra plans a revolution against Satan
- Mary Hamer: Signs of Cleopatra (1993)
- Margaret George: The Memoirs of Cleopatra (1997)
- Colleen McCullough: Caesar: Let the Dice Fly (1997), The October Horse (2002), and Antony and Cleopatra (2007)
- Kristiana Gregory: The Royal Diaries: Cleopatra VII: Daughter of the Nile, Egypt, 57 B.C. (1999)
- Colin Falconer: When We Were Gods (2000)
- Karen Essex: Kleopatra (2001) and Pharaoh (2002)
- Gillian Bradshaw: Cleopatra's Heir (2002)
- Steven Saylor: The Judgment of Caesar (2004)
- John Maddox Roberts: The Princess and the Pirates (2005)
- Joann Fletcher: Cleopatra the Great (2008)
- Michelle Moran: Cleopatra's Daughter (2009)
- Stacy Schiff: Cleopatra: A Life (2010)
- Pat Brown (criminal profiler): The Murder of Cleopatra: History's Greatest Cold Case (2013)
- Michael Livingston: The Shards of Heaven (2015)
- Francine Prose: Cleopatra: Her History, Her Myth (2022)
- Natasha Solomons: I Am Cleopatra (2025)

== Music ==
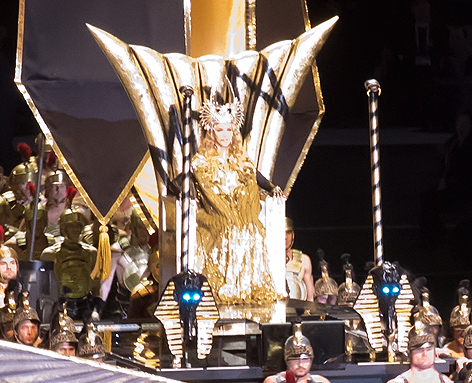
Madonna on a throne during the entrance of the 2012 Super Bowl Halftime Show, in a Cleopatra-inspired theme and outfit

- Fabiana Cantilo's "Cleopatra, La Reina del Twist"
- Taylor Swift's "When Emma Falls in Love" references Cleopatra
- Charles Griffes's "Cleopatra to the Asp" (1912)
- Danny Schmidt's "Cleopatra" (2005)
- Spin Doctors's "Cleopatra's Cat" (1994) (from Turn It Upside Down)
- Sophie Tucker's "Cleopatra Had a Jazz Band" (1917)
- Adam and the Ants's "Cleopatra" from Dirk Wears White Sox; later covered by Elastica
- Frank Ocean's "Pyramids" (2012) extensively references Cleopatra
- Epic Rap Battles of History's "Cleopatra vs. Marilyn Monroe"
- Katy Perry's video for "Dark Horse" features an Ancient Egyptian theme, with her playing "Katy-Patra"
- Madonna's "Like It or Not" references Cleopatra (from Confessions on a Dance Floor)
- Britney Spears’s Femme Fatale Tour third segment is represented by an Egyptian-theme and the singer, dressed as Cleopatra, performs Gimme More, (Drop Dead) Beautiful, He About to Lose Me, Boys and Don’t Let Me Be the Last to Know
- The Lumineers' Cleopatra. The album cover is of Theda Bara in Cleopatra
- Zico's video for "Eureka" features him being imprisoned by Cleopatra
- Cleopatra's "Cleopatra's Theme", from the album Comin' Atcha (1998).
- The Engineers' Drinking Song has a verse that lampoons the relationship between Cleopatra and Julius Caesar
- Karliene has a song called Cleopatra about her.

== Opera ==
- Cleopatra (1779) by Pasquale Anfossi
- Antony and Cleopatra by Samuel Barber
- La Mort de Cléopâtre (1829) (cantata) by Hector Berlioz
- Antoine et Cléopâtre (1972) by Emmanuel Bondeville
- Cleopatra (1904) (tone poem) by George Whitefield Chadwick
- La Cleopatra by Domenico Cimarosa
- Omnium (2005) by Norman Durkee
- Antoine et Cléopâtre (2006) by Lewis Furey (adapted from Shakespeare's Antony and Cleopatra)
- "Variation de Cléopâtre" (from Faust) by Charles Gounod
- Cleopatra e Cesare (1742) by Carl Heinrich Graun
- Great Caesar (1899) (burlesque) by George Grossmith, Jr. and Paul Rubens
- Cleopatra's Night by Henry Kimball Hadley
- Giulio Cesare (1724) by George Frideric Handel
- Antonio e Cleopatra (1725) (serenata) by Johann Adolph Hasse
- Antonio e Cleopatra (1937) by Gian Francesco Malipiero
- Cléopâtre (1914) by Jules Massenet
- Die unglückselige Kleopatra, Königin von Ägypten (1704) by Johann Mattheson
- Antonio e Cleopatra (1701) (serenata) by Alessandro Scarlatti
- Die Perlen der Kleopatra (1923) by Oscar Straus

== Plays ==
- Caesar's Revenge (1595) by Anonymous
- The False One (1620) by Francis Beaumont and Philip Massinger
- Caesar in Egypt (1724) by Colley Cibber (Cleopatra is a major character)
- Cleopatra by Samuel Daniel
- All for Love by John Dryden
- Marc-Antoine (c. 1578) by Robert Garnier
- Harmachio (1890) by H. Rider Haggard (renamed Cleopatra in 1891)
- Cléopâtre Captive (1552–1553) by Étienne Jodelle
- Cleopatra (1661) by Daniel Casper von Lohenstein
- Cléopâtre (1630) by Jean Mairet
- Cleopâtre (1750) by Jean-François Marmontel
- Cleopatra, Queen of Egypt, Her Tragedy (1639) by Thomas May
- Cléopâtre (1890) by Émile Moreau and Victorien Sardou
- Antony and Cleopatra (1677) by Charles Sedley
- Antony and Cleopatra by William Shakespeare
- Caesar and Cleopatra by George Bernard Shaw
- The Death of Cleopatra (1927) by Ahmed Shawqi
- The Tragedy of Antonie (c. 1592) by Mary Sidney

== Poetry ==
- "Dead Cleopatra Lies in a Crystal Casket" (1917) by Conrad Aiken
- "Cerchio II, Canto V" by Dante Alighieri (from Inferno)
- "Клеопатра" by Anna Akhmatova
- "Cléopâtre" (1670) by Isaac de Benserade
- "Cleopatrie Martiris, Egipti Regine" by Geoffrey Chaucer (from The Legend of Good Women)
- "Cleopatra" by Robert Crawford
- "La Cleopatra" (1632) by Girolamo Graziani
- "Antoine et Cléopâtre" (from Les Trophées, 1878–1887) by José-Maria de Heredia
- "Cleopatra to the Asp" (1960) by Ted Hughes
- "Antony and Cleopatra. An anecdote from Plutarch" (1825) by Letitia Elizabeth Landon
- "Cleopatra", a poem by Letitia Elizabeth Landon accompanying a design by Eliza Sharpe in oil colours for an 1837 gift book
- "Antony and Cleopatra" (1857) by William Haines Lytle
- "Au jardin de l’infante, Cléopâtre" (1893) by Albert Samain
- "Early in the Morning" (1955) by Louis Simpson
- "After Reading Antony and Cleopatra" (1890) by Robert Louis Stevenson
- "Cleopatra" (1868) by William Wetmore Story
- "Cleopatra" (1864) by Algernon Charles Swinburne
- "Cleopatra to the Asp" (1897) by John B. Tabb

== Television ==
- African Queens (2023) (Adele James)
- Antonio e Cleopatra (1965) (Valeria Valeri)
- Antony and Cleopatra (1974) Royal Shakespeare Company (Janet Suzman)
- Antony and Cleopatra (1981) BBC Television Shakespeare (Jane Lapotaire)
- Antony and Cleopatra (1983) (Lynn Redgrave)
- Astro Boy (1980): "The Return of Queen Cleopatra" (Season 1, Episode 31)
- Bewitched (1969) "Samantha's Caesar Salad", Samantha conjures up Cleopatra (Elizabeth Thompson) to try to persuade Julius Caesar to return to his time.(S6.E3)
- Cleopatra (Leonor Varela)
- Cleopatra (2010) (Sulaf Fawakherji)
- Cleopatra in Space (2019), an animated children's series
- The Cleopatras (Michelle Newell)
- Clone High: (Cleopatra "Cleo" Smith; voiced by Christa Miller and Mitra Jouhari)
- The Danny Thomas Show: "The Singing Sisters", as Kathy badgers Danny to audition a pair of singing nuns, he tells her "Okay, Cleopatra, get that snake away from me."
- Doctor Who:
  - "The Pandorica Opens", River Song poses as Cleopatra several decades after her death
  - "The Husbands of River Song", it is implied that The Doctor was once married to Cleopatra
- Fantasy Island: "My Fair Pharaoh", a woman (Joan Collins) wants to be Cleopatra
- General Electric Theater: "Caesar and Cleopatra" (Piper Laurie)
- Giulio Cesare (1990) (Susan Larson)
- Hallmark Hall of Fame: "Caesar and Cleopatra" (Geneviève Bujold)
- Histeria! (voiced by Tress MacNeille)
- Horrible Histories (Martha Howe-Douglas/Kathryn Drysdale/Jessica Ransom/Emily Lloyd-Saini)
- Imperium: Augustus (Anna Valle)
- Julius Caesar (Samuela Sardo)
- Legends of the Hidden Temple: "The Snake Bracelet of Cleopatra"
- Meeting of Minds: "Queen Cleopatra/Theodore Roosevelt/Thomas Aquinas/Thomas Paine" (Jayne Meadows)
- The Morecambe & Wise Show: "Season 5, Episode 5" (Glenda Jackson)
- Mujeres Insólitas: "La Sierpe del Nilo" (Rocío Dúrcal)
- Producers' Showcase: "Caesar and Cleopatra" (Claire Bloom)
- Puella Magi Madoka Magica: Episode 11
- Rocky and Bullwinkle
  - Banana Formula pt. 6 (TBA)
  - The Mr. Peabody and Sherman Show (Grey Griffin)
- Rome (2005–07) (Lyndsey Marshal)
- The Spread of the Eagle (1963) (TV series) (Mary Morris)
- The New Addams Family: "Cleopatra, Green of the Nile" (Adam Behr and Nicholas Podbrey)
- The Supersizers...: "The Supersizers Eat...Ancient Rome" (Sue Perkins)
- Teen Angel: "Honest Abe and Popular Steve" (Sue Giosa)
- You Are There: "The Death of Cleopatra" (Kim Stanley)
- Xena: Warrior Princess:
  - "King of Assassins" (Gina Torres)
  - "Antony & Cleopatra" (Jo Davidson/Lucy Lawless)
- Music video Horrible Histories Song – RA RA Cleopatra CBBC (about 2009)
  - Queen Cleopatra (Netflix) (2024)

== Tobacco ==
- Cleopatra cigarettes
