= Portrait of the Artist with his Family =

Painting by Jacob Jordaens

Self-Portrait with Parents, Brothers and Sisters
- Portrait of the Artist with his Family
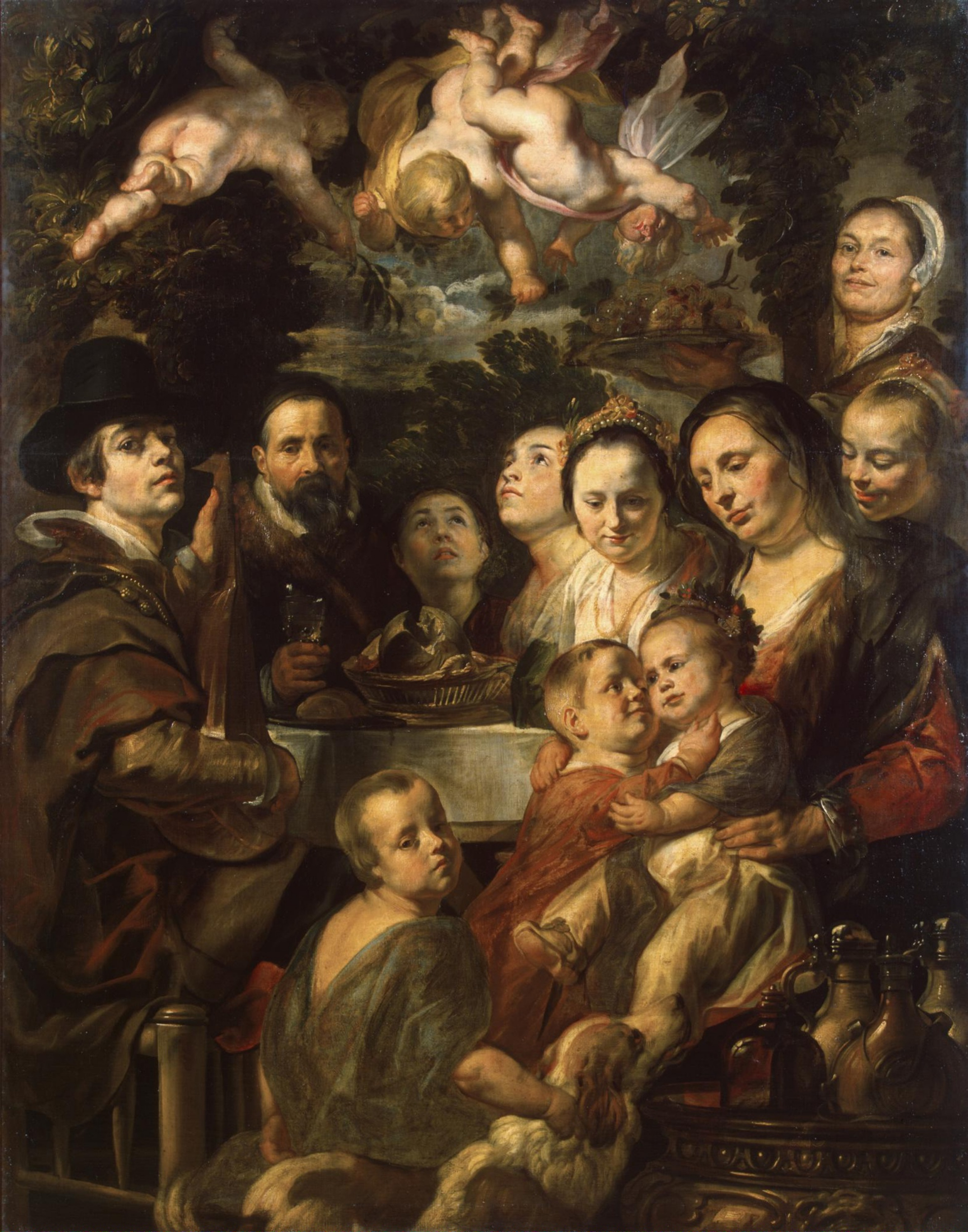
- Artist: Jacob Jordaens
- Year: 1615
- Medium: oil paint, canvas
- Dimensions: 175 cm (69 in) × 137.5 cm (54.1 in)
- Location: Hermitage Museum

Portrait of the Artist with his Family, also known as Self-Portrait with Parents, Brothers and Sisters is a c. 1615 painting by the Flemish artist Jacob Jordaens of himself with his parents and siblings. With Group Portrait, The Apostles Paul and Barnabas at Lystra (c. 1618) and The Banquet of Cleopatra, it is one of four works by the artist in the Hermitage Museum.

== Description ==
The painting shows 10 persons seated in a garden around a table. Jordaens himself is on the left playing the lute. Jordaens' father, a merchant in canvases, is to his left holding a glass of wine in his hand. Next to him are Jordaens' sisters Magdalena and Anna. Then follows his mother Barbara van Wolschaten holding her daughter Elisabeth on her knees. Jordaens' sisters Maria and Catherina are on the right-hand side of the painting. They are looking up at three putti fluttering above them among the foliage of the trees. In the foreground are the twins Abraham and Isaac. The family dog is in the bottom centre. On the left of the dog is a table holding bottles. Higher up on the right, a maidservant enters with a tray of fruit. A basket of bread is in the centre of the table.

== Meaning ==
It has been speculated that the painting depicts the family's celebration of Jordaens' admission as a master to the Antwerp Guild of St Luke in 1615. The painting is full of symbols of family harmony and bliss. Music represented by the lute is an embodiment of harmony and in the context of a family portrait it references a harmonious marriage. The dog and the grapevine twining round the pavilion symbolize conjugal fidelity.

The painting contains various religious symbols such as the bread and wine which symbolize the Eucharist. The raising of a goblet of wine by the father is likely a warning against excess in idle pleasures and a reminder of the need for restraint. The three putti hovering over the family likely represent the souls of the three daughters who had died young.

The composition of the painting was inspired by Peter Paul Rubens' altarpiece The Circumcision (Chiesa di S. Ambrogio, Genoa).

== Provenance ==
It is believed that the painting remained in the Jordaens family until the 18th century, when the work was acquired by the Duke of Portland. It then entered Robert Walpole's collection at Houghton Hall. There it was seen by George Vertue in 1722. He recorded this in his diary calling the painting correctly a painting by Jordaens of his father & mother and family. The painting was sold to the Hermitage Museum in 1779 during the reign of Catherine II of Russia. At that time, it was wrongly attributed to Jordaens' teacher and father-in-law Adam van Noort.
