= Awni Mutee =

Jordanian businessman and Criminal

- عوني مطيع
- Born: June 2, 1965 (age 60)
- Occupation: Businessman
- Known for: Worldwide cigarette counterfeiting

Awni Mutee or Awni Issa (Arabic: عوني مطيع), (born June 2, 1965), is a businessman and criminal mastermind in the international counterfeit cigarette industry. Since the 1990s, he has been known to produce international cigarette brands. Mutee built his business empire through strategic partnerships with influential political figures, which provided him with government protection. He partnered with the third richest man in Libya, they established a factory to produce Cleopatra cigarettes, which were later smuggled into Egypt.

== Legal issues and extradition ==
In 2005, Mutee became a fugitive after being wanted by Interpol for crimes in the Netherlands, including organized crime, tax evasion, and money laundering, following a raid on a cigarette factory in Hengelo. He was later acquitted due to insufficient evidence.

In 2018, Awni Mutee became embroiled in a prominent corruption scandal in Jordan, commonly known as the 'tobacco case'. This case implicated numerous high-ranking government officials and over twenty accomplices. Mutee, a businessman with significant connections, faced serious allegations, including actions that could disrupt the country's economic framework and threaten the fundamental conditions of its economic society. He was also charged with jeopardizing public safety and security, as well as offenses such as tax evasion, bribery, trademark infringement, smuggling, and money laundering. Prosecutors claimed that Mutee exploited Jordan's low-tax, free trade zones to manufacture counterfeit cigarettes for export, which he subsequently smuggled into the local market. It was alleged that he and his associates evaded approximately 539 million dinars (around US$760 million) in taxes and customs duties.

Before authorities could arrest him, Mutee fled Jordan just one day before raids on his four factories. His son, Bashar, also escaped minutes before an arrest warrant was issued. Awni Mutee was later extradited from Turkey to Jordan following a phone call between King Abdullah II and Turkish President Recep Tayyip Erdogan.

== Conviction and sentencing ==
On September 29, 2021, Jordan's State Security Court sentenced Awni Mutee to 22 years in prison for his involvement in the 'tobacco case,' described by local media as the biggest corruption scandal in the Kingdom's history. The court also sentenced his son, Bashar Awni, and the businessman Salameh Al Alamat to 22 years in prison for their roles. The case involved 29 defendants and 25 companies. Mutee's other son, Yousef and the rest of the defendants were sentenced to three and a half years in prison. The court ordered the confiscation of Mutee's extensive assets, including real estates, mansions, over 100 luxury cars, valuable license plate numbers, and jewelry worth millions.

== Public image and philanthropy ==
Awni Mutee, despite his involvement in criminal activities, was recognized for his philanthropic efforts. He served in an honorary capacity at the International Human Rights Commission and founded several organizations aimed at supporting the underprivileged. Additionally, Mutee held the honorary title of president of the Al Jalil Football Club in Jordan, highlighting his engagement in community initiatives.
