= The Banquet of Cleopatra (Jordaens) =

1653 painting by Jacob Jordaens

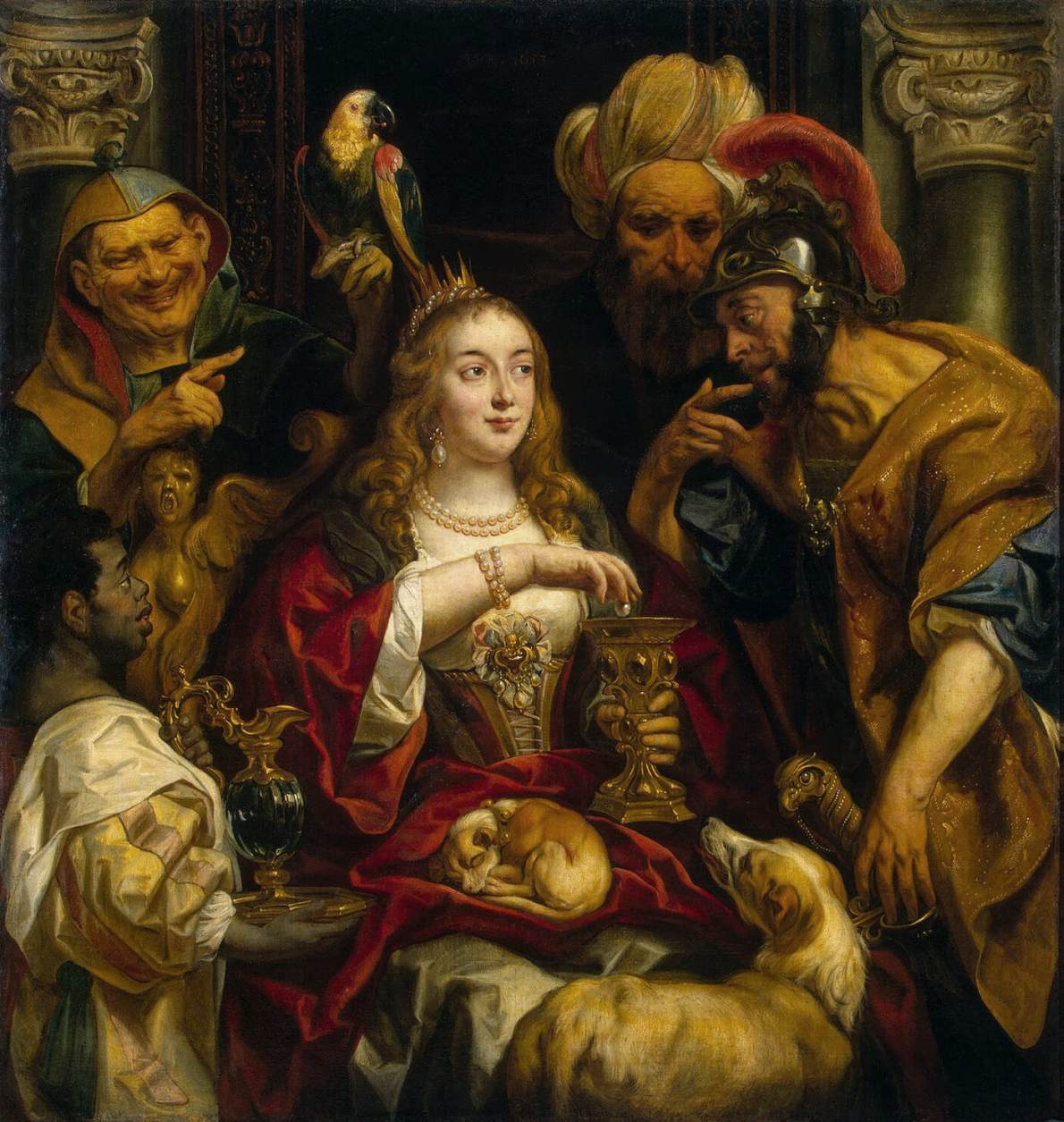
- Artist: Jacob Jordaens
- Year: 1653
- Medium: Oil on canvas
- Movement: Flemish Baroque
- Dimensions: 156 cm × 149 cm (61 in × 59 in)
- Location: Hermitage Museum; Saint Petersburg

The Banquet of Cleopatra is an oil-on-canvas painting by the Flemish Baroque painter Jacob Jordaens, from 1653. With Group Portrait (1650), The Apostles Paul and Barnabas at Lystra (c. 1618), and Portrait of the Artist with his Family (c. 1615), it is one of four works by the artist in the Hermitage Museum, in Saint Petersburg. It shows Cleopatra receiving Mark Antony aboard her barge.

The painting illustrates an episode described by Pliny the Elder in his Natural History: Cleopatra bet Mark Antony that she could spend ten million sestertii in a single meal. During the meal, she was served a cup of vinegar, in which she dissolved a huge, precious pearl and drank the contents of the cup. Lucius Munatius Plancus, who judged the bet, declared Cleopatra the winner. Mark Antony, his companion Ahenobarbus, and the black servant are frozen in amazement, their expressions mixed with dismay and admiration. Only the jester, pointing mockingly at Cleopatra with his right hand and displaying a grotesque sneer, emphasises the folly of her act.

This work was extremely popular in the art world throughout the 17th and 18th centuries. The subject of this painting was usually used by artists to depict luxurious court life, and was a popular subject for large decorative works, especially tapestries. However, Jordaens' emphasis is on morality: the painting is an allegory criticising the sins of pride and vanity, a theme typical of Netherlandish painting dating back to Pieter Bruegel and Hieronymus Bosch.

It is signed and dated at the top of the painting. At the top, in the centre, there is a barely visible signature of the artist and the date: J Jor. 1653. As the caption suggests, the painting was painted in 1653 and is probably a companion piece to Jordaens' The Death of Cleopatra, which is in the Kassel Art Gallery. The early history of the painting is unknown. It arrived at the Hermitage Museum in 1937 from the State Museum Fund, which accumulated and subsequently distributed works of art confiscated from private individuals after the October Revolution. It is on display in the New Hermitage building in Room 248. It is highly likely that The Banquet of Cleopatra, together with the painting from the Kassel Museum, belonged to a certain Giacomo Antonio Carenna—both works are mentioned in his will of 9 March 1669 as paintings from the series The History of Cleopatra.

N. I. Gritsai, head of the 13th–18th century painting section of the Western European Art Department at the Hermitage Museum, noted the following when describing the painting:

Possessing all the characteristics inherent in Jordaens' decorative works, this painting reflects ... one of the most important trends in his late work—a tendency to complicate the semantic content ... expressed in the saturation of his works with various symbolic and allegorical elements. ... It is no coincidence, for example, that Jordaens introduced a jester into the composition, who points at Cleopatra with a smirk, as if emphasising the absurdity of the queen's actions with this gesture.
