= Cleopatra: Her History, Her Myth =

2022 nonfiction book by Francine Prose

Cleopatra: Her History, Her Myth is a 2022 nonfiction book by Francine Prose. It is a part of Yale University Press' Ancient Lives series of books.

== Overview ==
The first half of the book dispels myths about Cleopatra's life and reign. The book's second half examines representations of Cleopatra in popular culture.

== Reception ==
The book received mostly positive reviews from critics, with particular praise for tackling myths about Cleopatra and addressing the sexualization of female rulers. A Publishers Weekly review described it as a lucid and persuasive reinterpretation."

Some critics felt that Prose's biography of Cleopatra was weaker than her literary analysis. Marissa Moss in NYJB wrote that "most effective part of the book is when Prose steps outside of history entirely and casts a critical eye on how books and movies made Cleopatra into a villain."

Arienne King of World History Encyclopedia praised the book's analysis of Cleopatra's literary portrayals, but criticized it for not examining Middle Eastern sources or Western media produced after 1963. Maxwell Carter of The Wall Street Journal criticized the book for being too flattering a portrayal of Cleopatra, writing: "That Ms. Prose is right about so much [...] makes the neatness and predictability of her moral conclusions all the more disappointing."
