= The Banquet of Cleopatra =

Title of several paintings depicting Cleopatra and Mark Antony

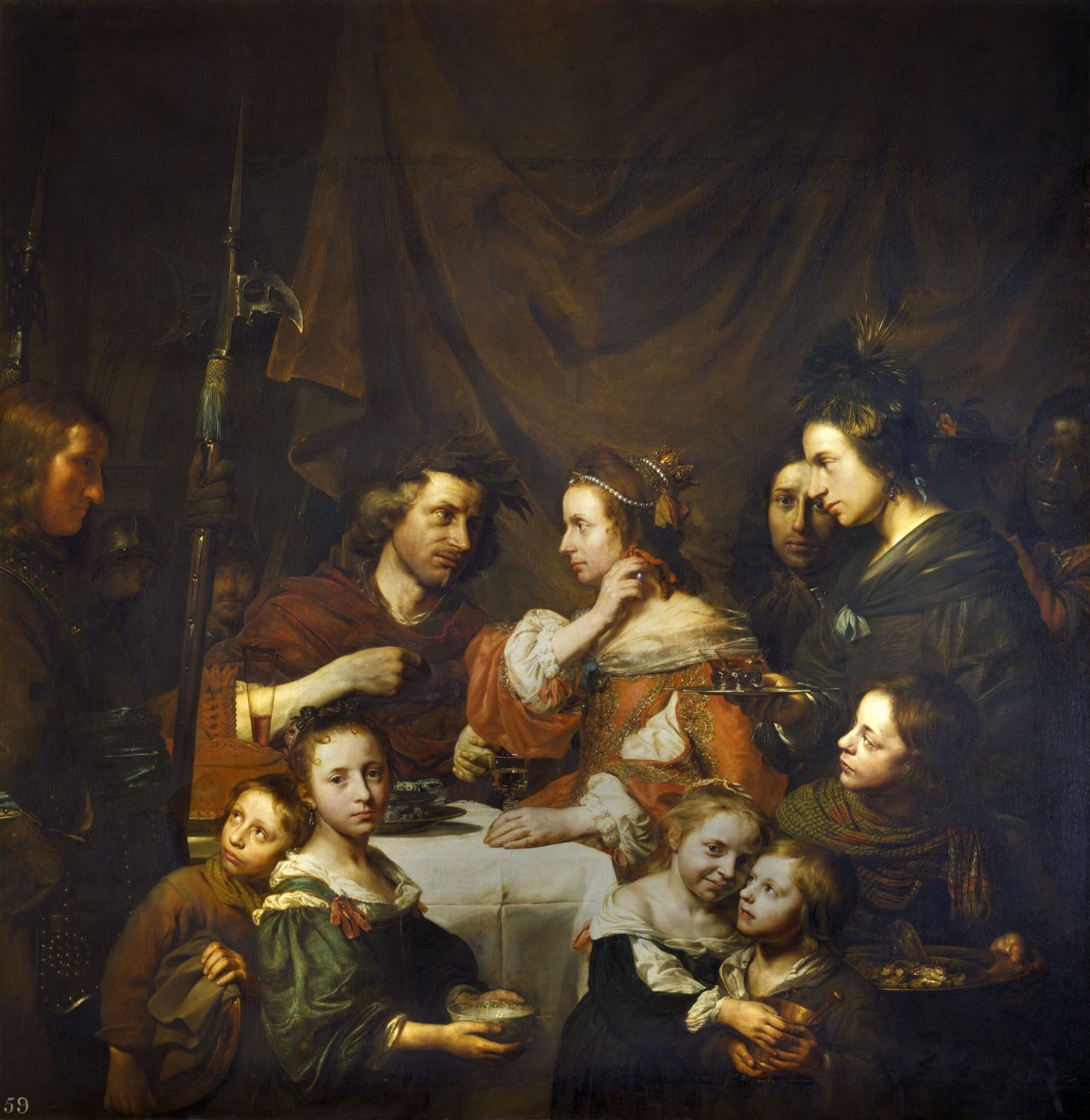
Jan de Bray, using his own family, including himself, as models, Royal Collection, 1652

The Banquet of Cleopatra is the title of several paintings showing the culmination of a wager between Cleopatra and Mark Antony as to which one could provide the most expensive feast. As recounted in Pliny the Elder's Natural History Cleopatra wins the wager: after Mark Antony's feast, Cleopatra drops a rare and precious pearl from her earring into a cup of vinegar and drinks it once the pearl has dissolved. The third person at the table is Lucius Munatius Plancus, at the time Antony's ally, who was to decide the winner of the wager.

Other titles for the same subject include The Wager of Cleopatra, Cleopatra and the Pearl, and so on; these may just include the two main figures. Paintings called Cleopatra's Feast are likely to show this incident. Another type of painting just showed Cleopatra with the pearl, either removing it from her ear, or about to drop it into the cup. These were mostly 17th and 18th century, and often portraits of a wealthy lady "as" Cleopatra, following a fashion at the time for portraits posing, sometimes with the appropriate costume, as historical figures, usually from the ancient world. These are called the portrait historié ("historicized portrait").

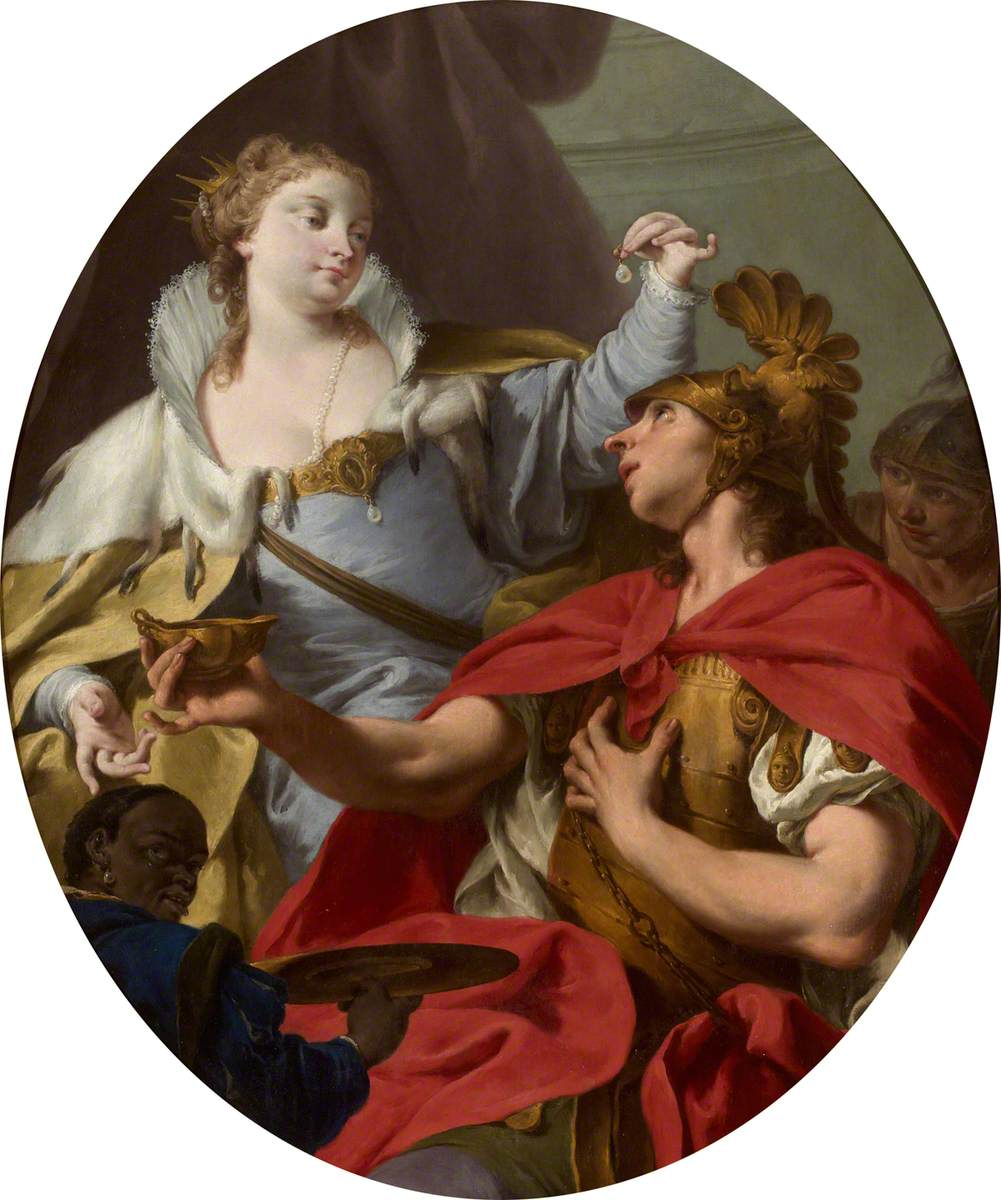
Giambattista Pittoni, 1736-1763

== Paintings ==
The subject became popular north of the Alps in the mid-17th century, and then in Italy in the 18th. Many artists painted more than one version. The most notable painting is by The Banquet of Cleopatra by the Italian artist Giovanni Battista Tiepolo, now in the National Gallery of Victoria in Melbourne, Australia. Tiepolo also painted two other different compositions with the subject, and it was also painted by various artists, including in Italian palace decorations.

In Dutch Golden Age painting and Flemish Baroque painting, there is a version by Jacob Jordaens (1653, Hermitage Museum) and one by Gérard de Lairesse (late 1670s, Rijksmuseum). Jan Steen painted a number of versions, for him rare ventures into history painting, but remaining within his typical area of convivial dining and drinking. There are two versions by Jan de Bray, using his own family, including himself, as models (Royal Collection, 1652, and Currier Museum of Art, New Hampshire, 1669). In between the two versions most of those depicted had died in an outbreak of plague, making the later version largely a memorial portrait.

Other artists included Gerard Hoet, who painted three versions of the subject in the early 18th century (two are in the Getty Center and Bayreuth, Germany).

In both the Italian and northern traditions the subject fitted well into existing genres showing lavish dining, with the added attraction of making a more prestigious history painting with an impeccable and exotic classical origin. It often formed part of cycles on Antony and Cleopatra with other subjects including the Meeting of Cleopatra and Mark Anthony, the Death of Cleopatra, and sometimes her meetings with Julius Caesar and Octavian.

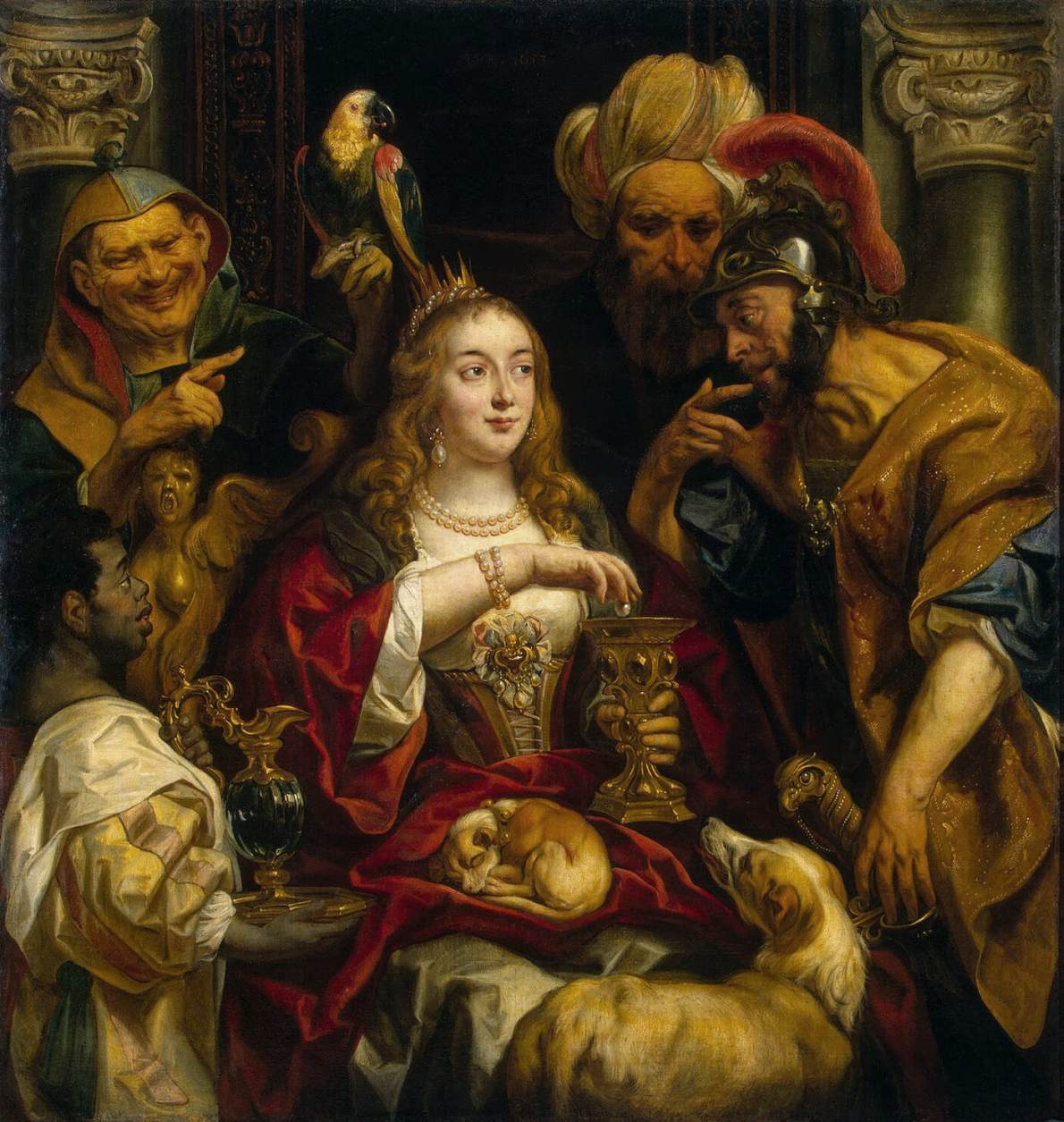
The Banquet of Cleopatra, Getty Museum, 1653, by Jacob Jordaens

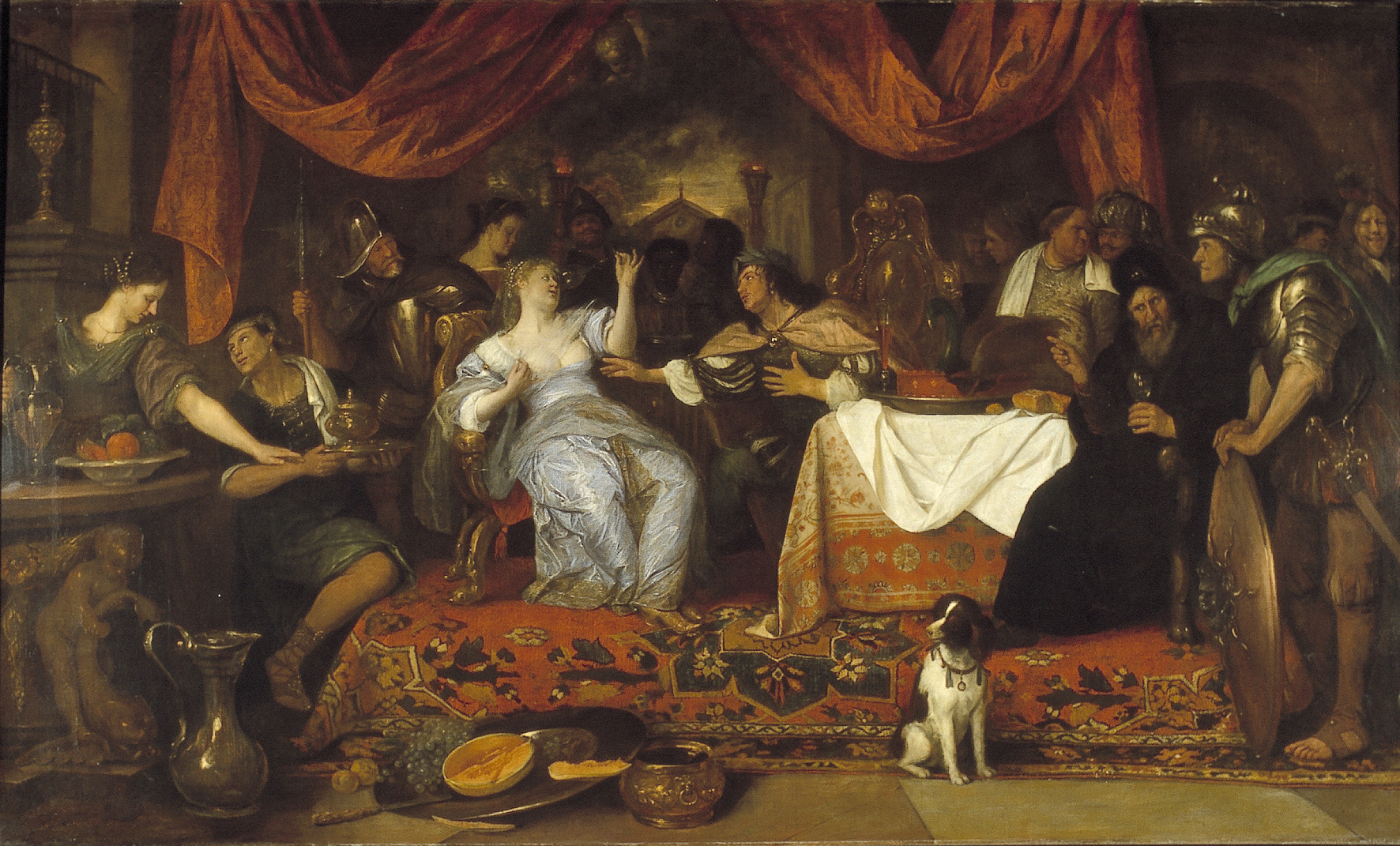
Jan Steen, c. 1668

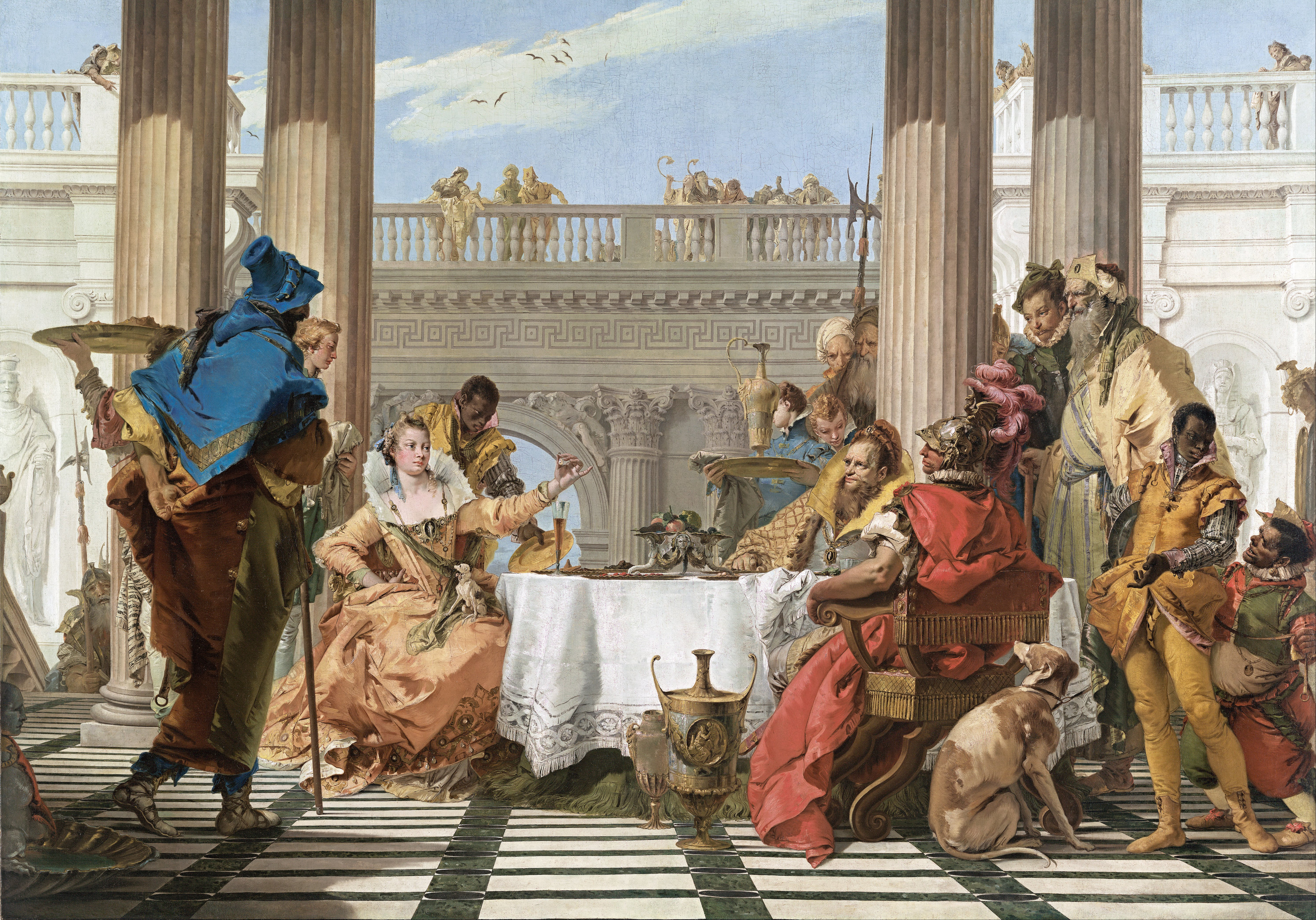
Giambattista Tiepolo, The Banquet of Cleopatra, Melbourne, 1744
