= Chariot of Fire =

- First edition (UK)
- Author: E. E. Y. Hales
- Language: English
- Publisher: Doubleday
- Publication date: 1977
- ISBN: 0-385-12399-X (first edition)
- Dewey Decimal: 823.914
- LC Class: PZ4.H1682 Ch3

Chariot of Fire is a fantasy novel by E. E. Y. Hales first published in 1977 by Doubleday in the US and later by Hodder & Stoughton in the UK.

== Plot summary ==
Chariot of Fire is a novel about Henry Brock and begins about 20 minutes after his death, where after filling out a long form totaling the times he sinned with his girlfriend, he is then assigned to the Second level of Hell, and Cleopatra asks for his aid in a revolution against Satan.

== Reception ==
C. Ben Ostrander reviewed Chariot of Fire in The Space Gamer No. 12. Ostrander commented that "I can't spoil the ending, but I don't want you to buy this book unless you are curious about myths and religious snicker/snackery."

Kirkus Reviews states "A painless Christian homiletic with some inventive Upper Form hilarity."
