= E. E. Y. Hales =

English Catholic historian (1908–1986)

Edward Elton Young Hales (8 October 1908 – 1 July 1986) was an English Catholic historian. Born in Nottingham, England, he was a son of James Elton Hales (born 23 July 1872) and Ethel Burbidge. During the late 1950s and early 1960s, "Teddy" Hales (as he was called by his friends) worked as an inspector in the British Ministry of Education in London, and was influential in promoting the study of world history in secondary schools in the UK. Hales compared his conversion to the Catholic Church with St. Paul's conversion experience, arguing that although "revelations such as Paul had were not to be expected by ordinary people like myself...moments of special illumination are granted, just very occasionally, to most of us in the course of our lives, and we do well to heed them when they come. I am glad, for instance, I heeded one that came to me the evening I first met the girl who was to be my wife; and I am glad I heeded one that carried me, at the age of forty, into the Catholic Church".

== Books ==
Some of his books include:

- Pio Nono: A Study in European Politics and Religion in the Nineteenth Century (P.J. Kenedy, 1954) online
- Mazzini and the Secret Societies: the Making of a Myth (Eyre & Spottiswoode, 1956)
- The Catholic Church in the Modern World (Doubleday, 1958)
- Revolution And Papacy, 1769-1846 (Doubleday, 1960)
- The Emperor and the Pope: The Story of Napoleon And Pius VII (Doubleday, 1961)
- Napoleon And the Pope: The Story of Napoleon and Pius VII (Eyre & Spottiswoode, 1962) [possibly a variant title of The Emperor and the Pope]
- Pope John and His Revolution (Doubleday, 1965)
- Chariot of Fire (Fantasy novel) 1977

== Death ==
He died at Bellagio, Italy while on holiday there. An obituary of E. E. Y. Hales was published in The Catholic Historical Review, Vol. LXXII (72) (1986), No. 4, pp. 711–712.
