= Cleopatra (cigarette) =

Egyptian cigarette brand

- An old Egyptian pack of Cleopatra cigarettes.
- Product type: Cigarette
- Produced by: Eastern Tobacco Company
- Country: Egypt
- Introduced: 1961; 65 years ago
- Markets: Egypt, Soviet Union

Cleopatra is a brand of cigarettes currently owned and manufactured by the Eastern Tobacco Company in Egypt. The brand is one of the most popular cigarette brands in Egypt and is sold in nearly every country in Africa, as well as various countries in the Middle East and Asia.

== Products ==
Cleopatra cigarettes come in the following varieties:

- Cleopatra Golden
- Cleopatra Lights
- Cleopatra Luxe
- Cleopatra Super Star
- Cleopatra Super Luxe

== See also ==
- Tobacco smoking
