= Group Portrait (Jordaens) =

Painting by Jacob Jordaens

Allegorical Family Portrait
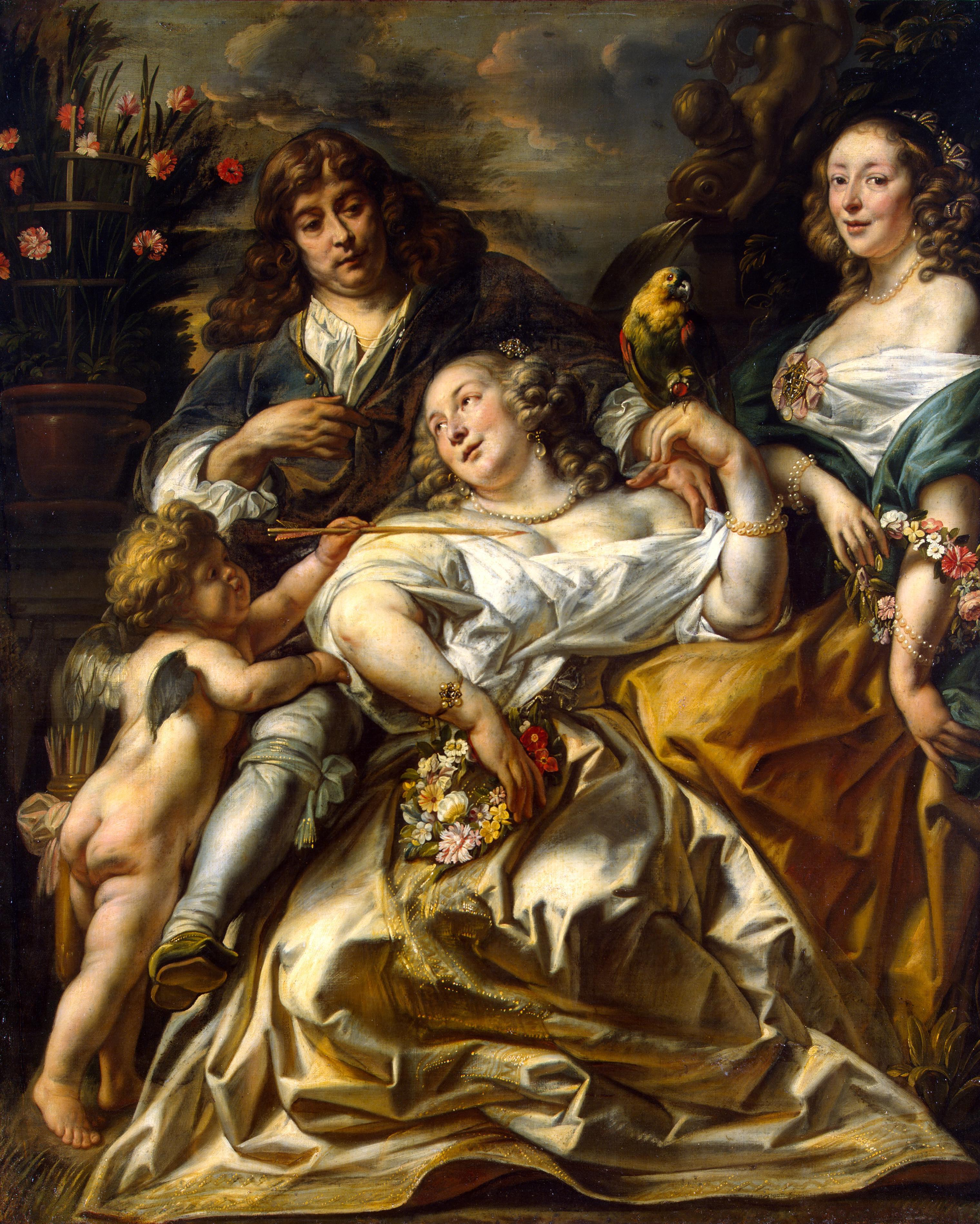
- Medium: Oil on canvas
- Movement: Flemish Baroque
- Dimensions: 178,4 cm × 152,3 cm (702 in × 600 in)
- Location: Hermitage Museum; Saint Petersburg

Group Portrait is a c. 1650, titled Allegorical Family Portrait by the Hermitage Museum, is an oil on canvas painting by the Flemish artist Jacob Jordaens (1593-1678). It entered the collection of the Hermitage Museum, St Petersburg, Russia in 1774.

== Description ==
This allegorical group portrait is of betrothal or marriage scene with Cupid, the god of love, pointing an arrow at the chest of the young woman in the center.

It shows four figures symbolising married love. The seated woman holds a parrot on her left hand and a floral crown (symbolic of marriage) in her right hand. A small Cupid touches the woman on the breast with his arrow while she rests her head on the breast of the man behind her. To the right a young woman runs another floral crown down her arm. Both women wear pearl bracelets.
