= Ahmed Shawki =

Ahmed Shawki (Arabic: أحمد شوقي)and its variants may refer to:

- Ahmed Shawqi (1868–1932), Egyptian pan-Arab poet and dramatist, a pioneer of the modern Egyptian literary movement
- Ahmed Chawki (born 1982), Moroccan pop singer

== See also ==
- Shawki
