= Shawki =

Shawki (also spelled Schauki, Shawky, Shawqi, Shoghi, Shauki) Arabic: شوقي, French: Chaouqui or Turkish: Şevki), is a masculine Arabic given name and surname.

It may refer to:

== Given name ==
- Shawqi Aboud (1927–2008), Iraqi football manager
- Shawki Awad Balzuhair (born 1981), citizen of Yemen, held in extrajudicial detention in the US Guantanamo Bay detainment camps in Cuba
- Shawki Ibrahim Abdel-Karim Allam (born 1961), Grand Mufti of Egypt
- Shawky Gharib (born 1959), Egyptian football player
- Shawqi Shafiq (born 1955), Yemeni poet and translator
- Şevki Balmumcu (1905–1982), Turkish architect
- Shoghí Effendí (1897–1957), Guardian and appointed head of the Baháʼí Faith from 1921 until his death in 1957
- Shawqi Abdul Amir (born 1949), Iraqi poet
- Afdlin Shauki (born 1971), Malaysian film producer and screenwriter

== Middle name ==
- Yakup Şevki Subaşı (1876–1939), also known as Yakub Shevki Pasha, general of the Ottoman Army and the Turkish Army

== Surname ==
- Ahmed Shawqi (1868–1932), Egyptian pan-Arab poet, dramatist
- Ahmed Chawki (born 1982), Moroccan singer, also known as Chawki
- Ayman Shawky (born 1962), Egyptian football player
- Farid Shawki (1920–1998), Egyptian actor, screenwriter and film producer
- Maged Shawky, Egyptian businessman and administrator
- Mohamed Shawki (born 1981), Egyptian footballer
- Tarek Shawki (born 1957), the Chief of the ICTs Section within the "Information Society Division" in UNESCO, Paris, France

== Others ==
- Ahmed Shawki Museum, museum in Cairo, Egypt, in tribute of poet Ahmed Shawqi
- Chawki silkworms, alternative name for Bombyx mori
