= Baháʼí orthography =

Romanization scheme for Arabic and Persian words, used in Bahá'í literature

Texts of the Baháʼí Faith use a standard system of orthography to romanize Persian and Arabic script. The system used in Baháʼí literature was set in 1923, and although it was based on a commonly used standard of the time, it has its own embellishments that make it unique.

Shoghi Effendi, head of the religion from 1921 to 1957, created the system of Baháʼí orthography and shared a list of examples of common terms with Baháʼís around the world in several letters in 1923. The stated need for standardized transliteration was to "avoid confusion in future, and insure in this matter a uniformity which is greatly needed at present in all Baháʼí literature." According to the standard, the most common terms are "Baháʼí", "Baháʼís", "Báb", "Baháʼu'lláh", and "ʻAbdu'l-Bahá", using accent marks to distinguish long vowels, and raised turned versus raised commas to distinguish ayin and hamza, respectively.

Since the Baháʼís adopted their system, Middle Eastern scholars have modified the standard academic system adopted in 1894 in various ways, and have created a separate, related system for writing Persian (a principal change being use of e and o). The Baháʼí system, however, has now been used to print thousands of books and pamphlets in many languages, hence modifying it would create confusion and force authors to use two different spelling systems (one in passages being quoted exactly, the other in the rest of the text).

== Background ==
Western Baháʼís in the lifetime of ʻAbdu'l-Bahá used a variety of transliterations from Arabic. For example, Baháʼu'lláh – the Faith's founder, was written in a variety of spellings. ʻAbdu'l-Bahá in 1906 instructed to write the term Bahaʼo'llah, and later in 1921 requested that it be written Baha ʼUllah.

The Baháʼí transliteration scheme that Shoghi Effendi adopted was based on a standard adopted by the Tenth International Congress of Orientalists which took place in Geneva in September 1894. Shoghi Effendi changed some details of the Congress's system, most notably in the use of digraphs in certain cases (e.g. ⟨s͟h⟩ instead of ⟨š⟩), and in incorporating the solar letters when writing the definite article al- (Arabic: ال) according to pronunciation (e.g. ar-Raḥím, aṣ-Ṣaddíq, instead of al-Raḥím, al-Ṣaddíq). He also introduced certain spelling variations that reflect Persian pronunciation (e.g. ⟨v⟩ instead of ⟨w⟩), specifically an Isfahani accent (e.g. ⟨Mihdí⟩ instead of ⟨Mahdí⟩).

A list of frequently used words using the new system was first shared in 1923 and later published in The Baháʼí Yearbook of 1926. Minor updates were published in The Baháʼí World volumes III (1930) and VII (1939). The system has been widely adopted by Baháʼí publishers. The underdots, underscores, and sometimes the accents are frequently omitted online and in less formal writing due to the difficulty in rendering text.

== Perso-Arabic script ==
Letter	Arabic Name	Persian Name	Transliteration	Value (IPA) ^{[a]}
ا	ʼalif	ʼalef	á, a	/aː/, /a/ (Arabic); /ɒː/, /æ/ (Persian)
ب	báʼ	bé	b	/b/
پ	–	pé	p	/p/ (Persian)
ت	táʼ	té	t	/t/
ث	t͟háʼ	sé	t͟h ^{[c]}	/θ/ (Arabic); /s/ (Persian)
ج	jím	jím	j	/d͡ʒ/
چ	–	c͟hé	c͟h	/t͡ʃ/ (Persian)
ح	ḥáʼ	hé	ḥ	/ħ/ (Arabic); /h/ (Persian)
خ	k͟háʼ	k͟hé	k͟h	/x/
د	dál	dál	d	/d/
ذ	d͟hál	zál	d͟h	/ð/ (Arabic); /z/ (Persian)
ر	ráʼ	ré	r	/r/
ز	záy	zé	z	/z/
ژ	–	z͟hé	z͟h	/ʒ/ (Persian)
س	sín	sín	s	/s/
ش	s͟hín	s͟hín	s͟h	/ʃ/
ص	ṣád	sád	ṣ	/sˤ/ (Arabic); /s/ (Persian)
ض	ḍád	zád	ḍ	/dˤ/ (Arabic); /z/ (Persian)
ط	ṭáʼ	tá	ṭ	/tˤ/ (Arabic); /t/ (Persian)
ظ	ẓáʼ	zá	ẓ	/ðˤ/ (Arabic); /z/ (Persian)
ع	ʻayn	ʼayn	ʻ ^{[d]}	/ʕ/ (Arabic); /ʔ/ (Persian)
غ	g͟hayn	qayn	g͟h	/ɣ/ (Arabic); /ɢ/~/ɣ/ (Persian)
ف	fáʼ	fé	f	/f/
ق	qáf	qáf	q	/q/ (Arabic); /ɢ/~/ɣ/ (Persian)
ك ک (Persian)	káf	káf	k	/k/
گ	–	gáf	g	/ɡ/ (Persian)
ل	lám	lám	l	/l/
م	mím	mím	m	/m/
ن	nún	nún	n	/n/
و	wáw	váv	ú, v	/uː/; /w/ (Arabic); /v/ (Persian)
ه	háʼ	hé	h	/h/
ي ^{[b]} ی (Persian)	yáʼ	yé	í, y	/iː/, /j/
ء	hamzah	hamzé	ʼ ^{[d]}	/ʔ/

- ^a Real phonetic values of Arabic vary regionally and the table mostly demonstrates the abstract Arabic phonemes.
- ^b In Persian, the final form of the letter is written undotted.
- ^c The Unicode character for the underline, 'combining double macron below', is U+35F (decimal U+863). It can be written as hex &#x35F; or decimal &#863;, or with the template {{underscore}}. HTML underlining (i.e., <u>...</u>) should not be used, as it's not copy-safe.
- ^d The Unicode character for the ʻayin, the 6-like 'combining letter turned comma', is U+2BB (decimal U+699), and the character for hamza, the 9-like 'combining letter apostrophe', is U+2BC (decimal U+700). They can be written as &#x2BB; and &#x2BC; (decimal &#699; and &#700;), or with the templates {{okina}} and {{hamza}}.

== Comparison to common Latinizations ==
The Baháʼí transliteration can often differ markedly from versions commonly in use in English.

Baháʼí Orthography	Common English Representation	Persian pronunciation	Arabic pronunciation	Perso-Arabic Spelling
Ád͟hirbáyján	Azerbaijan	/ɒzæɾbɒːjˈdʒɒːn/	/ʔæðeɾbiːˈdʒæːn/	آذربایجان
Fáṭimih	Fatima	/fɒːteˈme/	/fɑːˈtˤɪmæ, ˈfɑːtˤɪmæ/	فاطمه
S͟hog͟hí	Shawki	/ˈʃoːɣi/	/ˈʃæwʔi, ˈʃɑwqi/	شوقی
Siyyid	Sayyid	/sejˈjed/	/ˈsæjjɪd/	سید

While the accent and phonemic diacritic marks in the word "Baháʼí" indicate a three syllable pronunciation as [bæhɒːˈʔiː], the official pronunciation guide of the Baháʼí World News Service gives a two syllable pronunciation of "ba-HIGH" /bəˈhaɪ/ for English. The realization of the English pronunciation varies. The Oxford English Dictionary has /bæˈhɑːiː/ ba-HAH-ee, Merriam-Webster has /bɑːˈhɑːiː/ bah-HAH-ee (reflecting in the first syllable the difference between the UK and the US with the 'pasta' vowel), and the Random House Dictionary has /bəˈhɑːiː/ bə-HAH-ee, all with three syllables.
