= Şevki =

Şevki or Sevki is a given name. Notable people with the name include:

- Şevki Balmumcu (1905–1982), Turkish architect
- Şevki Koru (1913–2003), Turkish long-distance runner
- Sevki Sha’ban (born 1984), Singapore footballer

== See also ==
- Shawki
