= Ahmed Shawki Museum =

Coordinates: 30°01′17″N 31°13′03″E

Ahmed Shawki Museum متحف احمد شوقي
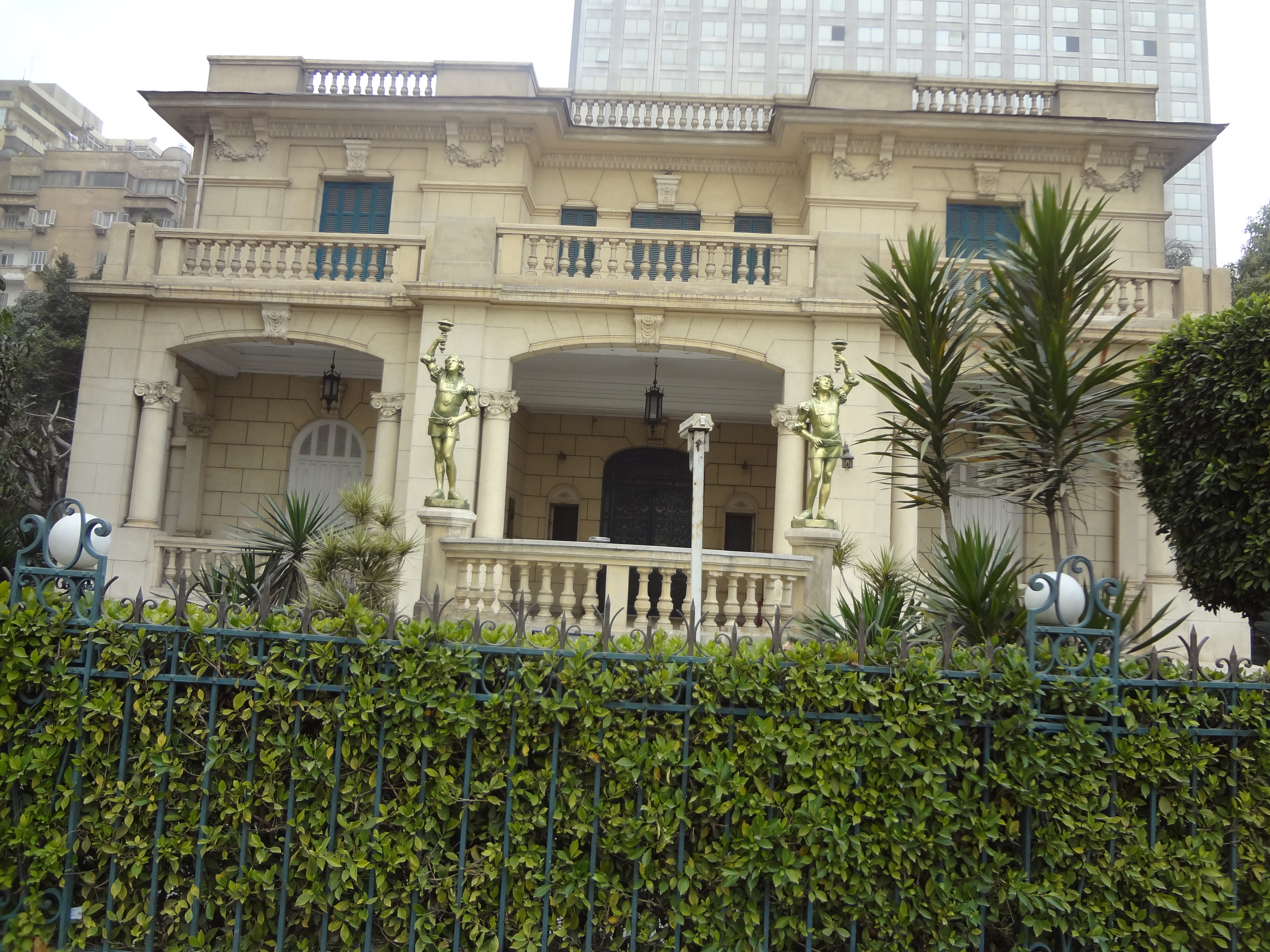
- Established: as a palace on 1930s?, as a museum in 1977
- Location: Giza (Egypt)
- Type: Museum
- Collection size: Personal belongings of the Egyptian Poet Ahmed Shawqi
- Visitors: Public
- Website: www.ashawkymuseum.gov.eg

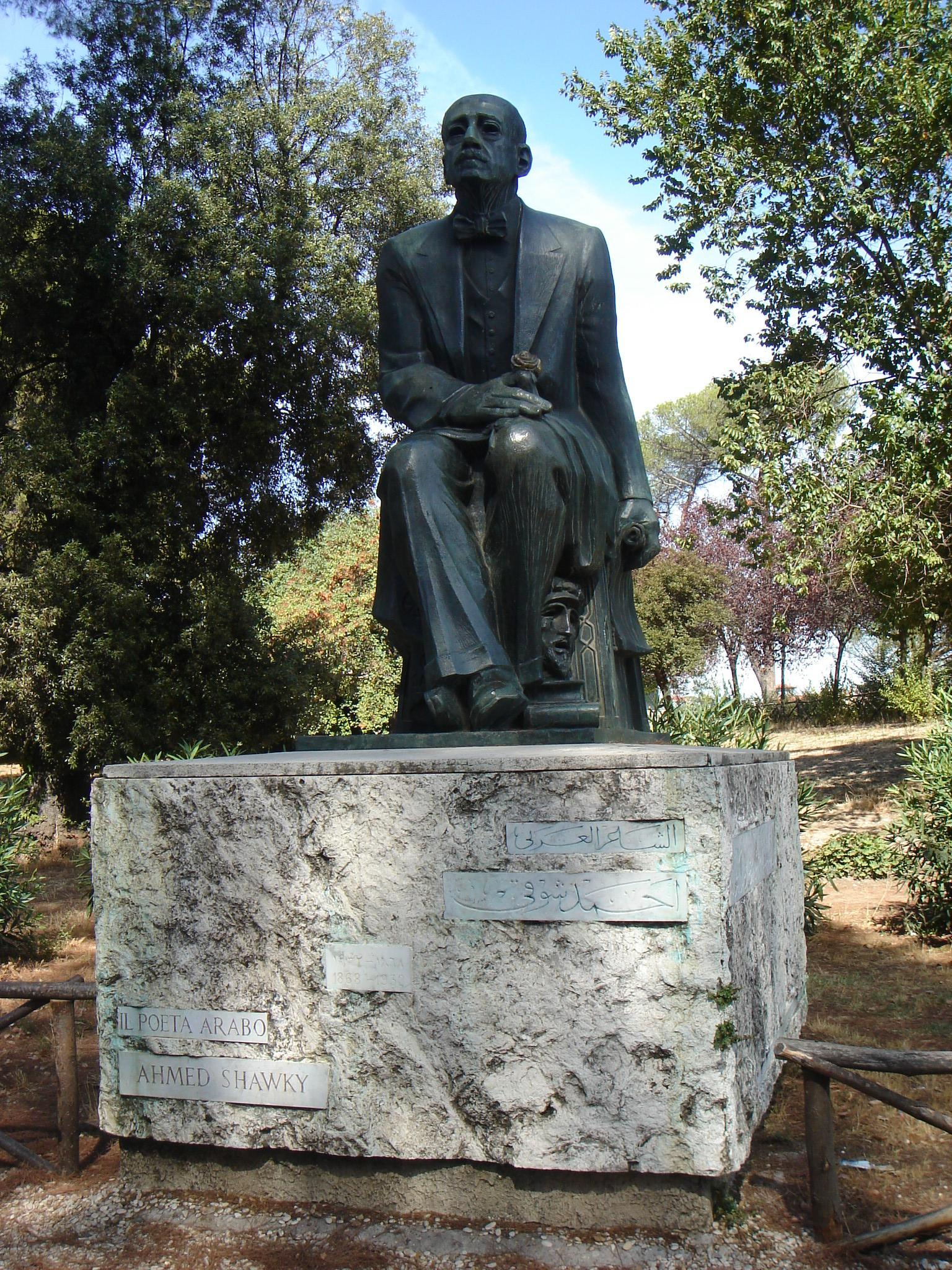
Monument to Shawqi in Villa Borghese, Rome, Italy. The museum has a copy of this.

Ahmed Shawki Museum is a writer's house museum dedicated to Egyptian poet and dramatist Ahmed Shawki (1869–1932).

== Location ==
It is located on the Nile Corniche, Giza part of Cairo, Egypt.

== History ==
The museum is named after and dedicated to the poet and dramatist Ahmed Shawki (1869–1932), who used to live in ‘Karmet Ibn Hani’ or Ibn Hani’s Vineyardin كرمة ابن هانىء at Al-Matariyyah area near the palace of the Khedive Abbas II at Saray El-Qobba until he was exiled. After returning to Egypt, he built a new house at Giza which he named the new Karmet Ibn Hani. The Giza house later on became Ahmed Shawki Museum. It was first acquired in 1914 and named ‘Karmet Ibn Hani’ or Ibn Hani’s Vineyard, after the poet Abu Nawwas. It takes the form of a lavish white palace surrounded by a green garden and officially opened on 17 June 1977.

== Exterior ==
The museum is noted for its bronze statues. In the garden, there is a large statue of the poet, created by late Egyptian sculptor Gamal El-Sagini. The statue was erected in a ceremony marking the 50th anniversary of the poet's death. It is however a replica, as the Italian Government ordered in 1962 that it be erected in the Borghese Park, Rome, alongside the statues of other world artistic figures. The ceremony was attended by the Egyptian and Italian Ministers of Culture, the Mayor of Rome, and many Arab artists, poets, and writers. There are also bronze statues of torch-bearing cherubic messengers. The torches represent enlightenment.

== Interior ==
=== Ground floor ===
On the ground floor is the Mohammed Abdel Wahab Suite which comprises Ahmed shawki's library with 332 books and valuable draft manuscripts of poems hand-written by the poet on plain paper. There is also work related to singer and composer Mohammed Abdel Wahhab who was introduced to art by Shawqi and once practised and performed for Ahmed Shawki. There is a high-quality audio library in the museum containing such recordings.

=== Upper floor ===
The upper floor comprises his bedroom with his grand bed with high brass poles, a dressing table, photographs and then the room of Mrs. Khadija Hanem Shaheen, the poet's wife noted for its old-style elegant furniture and brass effigies of cherubim. There is a room on the upper floor containing more than 713 manuscripts and drafts of the poet's work and also a collection of oil paintings, antiques and photographs related to Shawki's life. Next to the study, there is a room presenting his accolades, ranging from gifts and certificates, to insignias and badges of honor including an encased gala uniform.

== See also ==
- List of museums in Egypt
- Taha Hussein Museum
