= The Death of Cleopatra (play) =

1929 play by Ahmad Shawqi

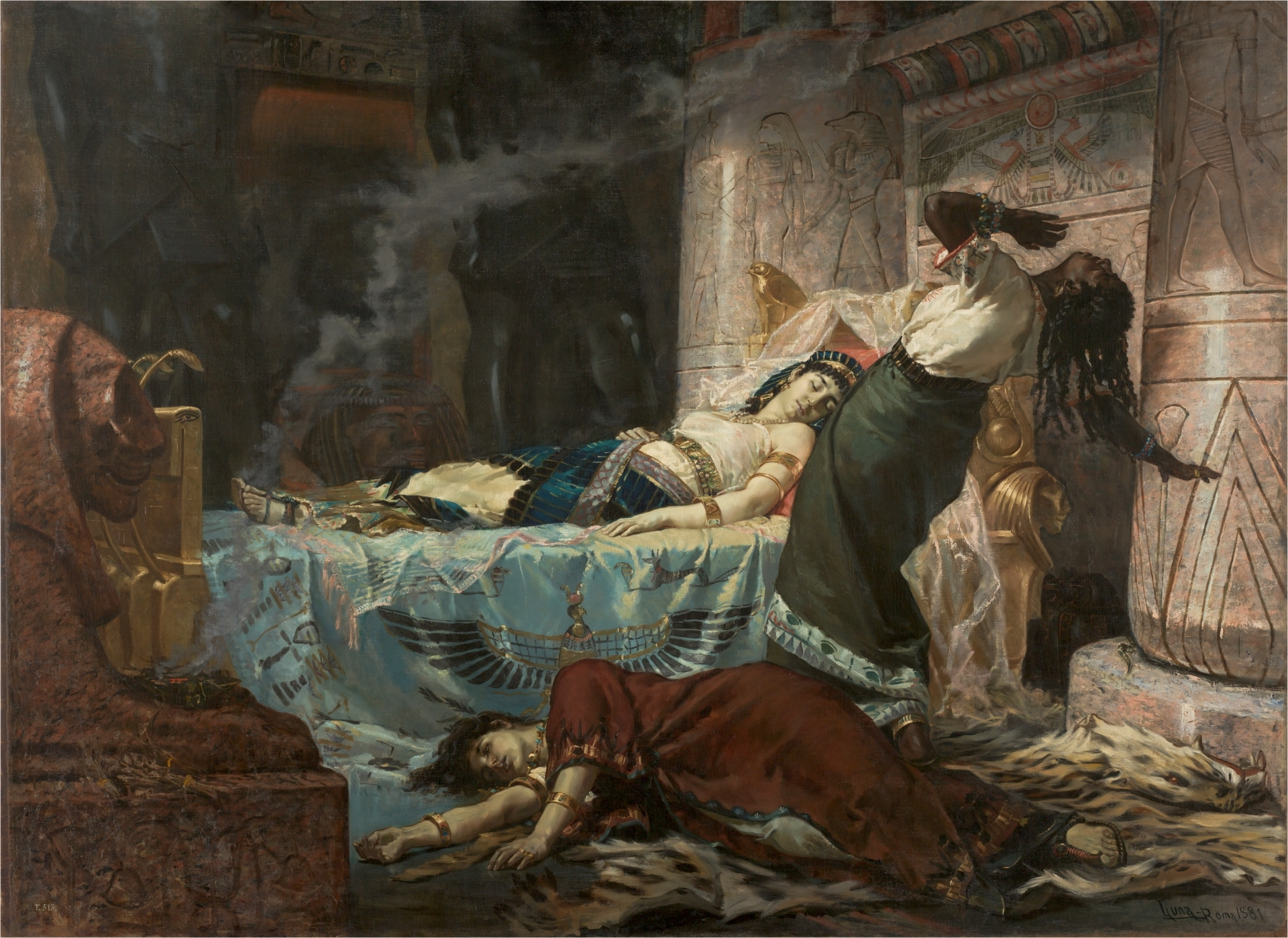
- 1881 depiction of the death of Cleopatra by Juan Luna
- Original title: مصرع كليوباترا
- Original language: Arabic
- Written by: Ahmad Shawqi

The Death of Cleopatra (Arabic: مصرع كليوباترا, romanized: Maṣraʿ Kilyūbātrā) is a 1929 verse play by Egyptian poet and playwright Ahmed Shawqi. It depicts the last days of Cleopatra's life in Alexandria and the events surrounding the Battle of Actium and the Roman conquest of Egypt.

== Background ==
Ahmed Shawqi was an Egyptian poet who rose to national prominence after his return from exile following the 1919 Egyptian revolution. He was a supporter of Pharaonism, a cultural and political movement which saw Egypt's national identity as rooted in its Pharaonic past. Pharaonism directly conflicted with Arab nationalism as a non-religious, explicitly Egyptian ideology.

Shawqi wrote The Death of Cleopatra as a way of improving Cleopatra's reputation. He was deliberately writing against Shakespeare's Antony and Cleopatra, in which Cleopatra is portrayed as a "viper of the Nile", corrupting Roman purity.

The Death of Cleopatra was published with a critical essay titled "Analytical Views" (Arabic: نظرات تحليلية, romanized: Naẓarāt Taḥlīliyya) in which Shawqi discussed and defended his choice of subject matter.

== Plot ==
The plot of Shawqi's play largely follows that of Shakespeare's: Cleopatra and her lover, Mark Antony, one of the triumvirs of the Roman Republic, are attempting to repel an invasion by Octavian. In the Battle of Actium, Cleopatra withdraws her fleet in the midst of the battle, thereby weakening Antony's forces and causing their defeat. After this initial defeat, Antony and his army are successful in a day of battle, and plan to fully defeat Octavian the next day. The victory is celebrated at Cleopatra's palace, where the royal couple drink wine, sing and listen to music.

During the next day's fighting, however, Antony's forces are completely destroyed. Antony escapes and flees, and wanders around distraught. After Olympus – a Roman doctor in Cleopatra's household who has defected to Octavian – tells Antony that Cleopatra has committed suicide, Antony asks Eros, a soldier, to kill him; Eros commits suicide instead, inspiring Antony to fall on his sword. Antony is unaware that Cleopatra is indeed alive. Cleopatra struggles to accept Antony's suicide, and ultimately kills herself at the end of the play.

== Sources ==
- Reid, Donald Malcolm (2015). "Egyptian Egyptology and Pharaonism in the Wake of Tutankhamun, 1922–1930". Contesting Antiquity in Egypt: Archaeologies, Museums, and the Struggle for Identities from World War I to Nasser. Cairo: American University in Cairo Press. ISBN 9781617976759.
- al-Khatib, Waddah (2001). "Rewriting History, Unwriting Literature: Shawqī's Mirror-Image Response to Shakespeare". Journal of Arabic Literature. 32 (3): 256–283.
- al-Shetawi, Mahmoud F. (2013). "Arabic Adaptations of Shakespeare and Postcolonial Theory". Critical Survey. 25 (3): 4–28.
