= Shawqi Abdul Amir =

Iraqi poet and diplomat

- شوقي عبد الأمير
- Born: 12 September 1949 (age 76); Nassiriyah
- Education: Paris-Sorbonne University
- Occupation: Poet

Shawqi Abdul Amir (born 12 September 1949) is an Iraqi poet and former diplomat. Born in Nassiriyah, he received his master's degree in comparative literature from the Sorbonne in 1974. He worked as a teacher in Algeria, joined journalism and cultural affairs and worked as a press consultant at the South Yemen Embassy in Paris and been director of the Yemeni Cultural Center in Paris since 1991. He founded Kitâb fî Jarîda in 1995 to make literature freely available to individuals and households across the Arab world, particularly those who lack the financial means to buy books.

== Life ==
He was born in Nassiriyah on 12 September 1949. He received his MA in Comparative Literature from the Sorbonne University in Paris in 1974. He worked as a teacher for a period in Algeria, then moved to journalism and cultural work. He was appointed editor-in-chief of Le Monde Arabe (?) in the French press, and worked as a press consultant at Embassy of the People's Democratic Republic of Yemen in Paris. Worked in the field of international relations of UNESCO, became an expert in international cultural relations for 10 years, and the Iraqi cultural advisor at the UNESCO, founded the Kitâb fî Jarîda project, the largest Arab cultural project under the auspices of UNESCO.
He spent 35 years in exile between Algeria, Yemen and Paris, until he settled in Beirut, Lebanon.

== Poetry works ==
- Conversation for the singer of Arabia, 1976
- Fetuses and rags of the desert, 1978
- Borders, poetry, 1980
- Ababyl, poetry, 1985
- Word of River, 1986
- Word of Qarmate, 1987
- The Stone after the flood, 1990
- The Seven Chronicles, 1992
- Spur of Pagan Lands, trans. by Bernard Noël and the author, Asnières-sur-Oise, 1990
- Diary of poetry in exile
- Diwan of Probabilities, 2000
- Signatures, 2004
- Diwan of the place, 2000
- Poetic Works, 2000
- The Obelisk of Anaïl, 2003
- Birth of the Palm, 2004
- Fearless, 2005
- Surrounded sections, 2005
- Failed Attempt to Assault Death, Poetry, 2009
- The fifth face of the ego obelisk, Poetry, 2011
- The Virtual Court, Poetry, 2014
- Me and vice versa, Poetry, 2016
- Attempts on Death, 2020
