= Maged Shawky =

Maged Shawky, an Egyptian businessman and administrator, was the chairman of the Cairo & Alexandria Stock Exchange since July 2005, after being the deputy chairman for almost a year. He resigned in 2010. He had also represented the Regulator (Capital Market Authority) as a board member of the Exchange for three years. He held the position of Senior Assistant to the Minister of Economy and Foreign Trade for Securities Markets issues for around 12 years.

Shawky chairs the African Securities Exchanges Association. He vice-chairs the Federation of Euro-Asian Stock Exchanges. Shawky also serves as member of the board for the Economic Committee, National Democratic Party, and Misr for Clearing Depositary & Registration. He is also a member of National Post Organization.

== Education and publication ==
Shawky holds a master's degree in Financial Economics from Queen Mary, University of London, United Kingdom. He had previously graduated from the department of commerce in Helwan University in Egypt. He has authored and co-authored a number of research papers on corporate governance and modeling volatility of the market; some have been published in regional and international periodicals.
