= Gamal El-Sagini =

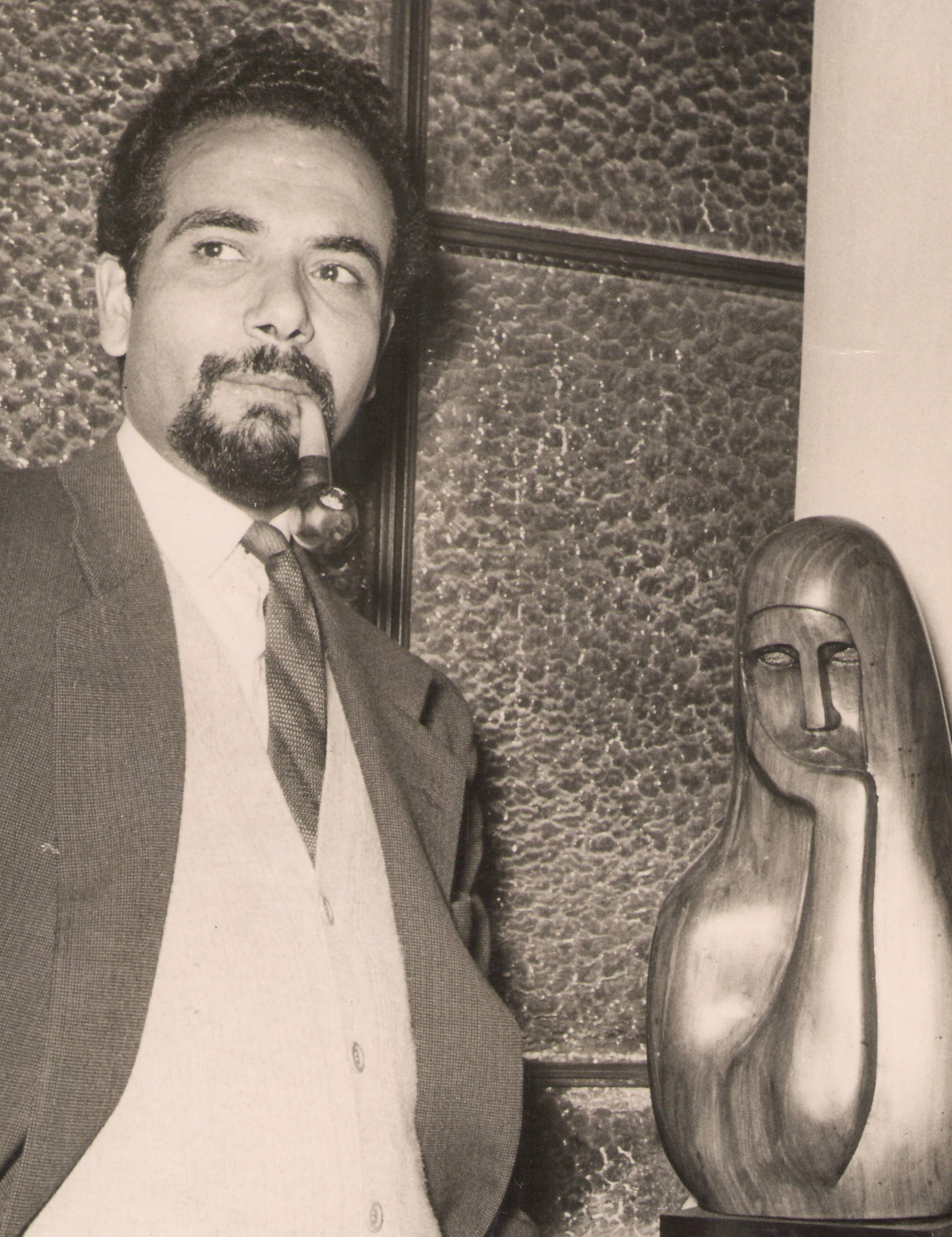
Gamal El-Sagini

Gamal El-Sagini (Arabic: جمال السجيني) (January 7, 1917 – November 19, 1977) was an Egyptian sculptor, painter and medalist.

== Childhood and Education ==
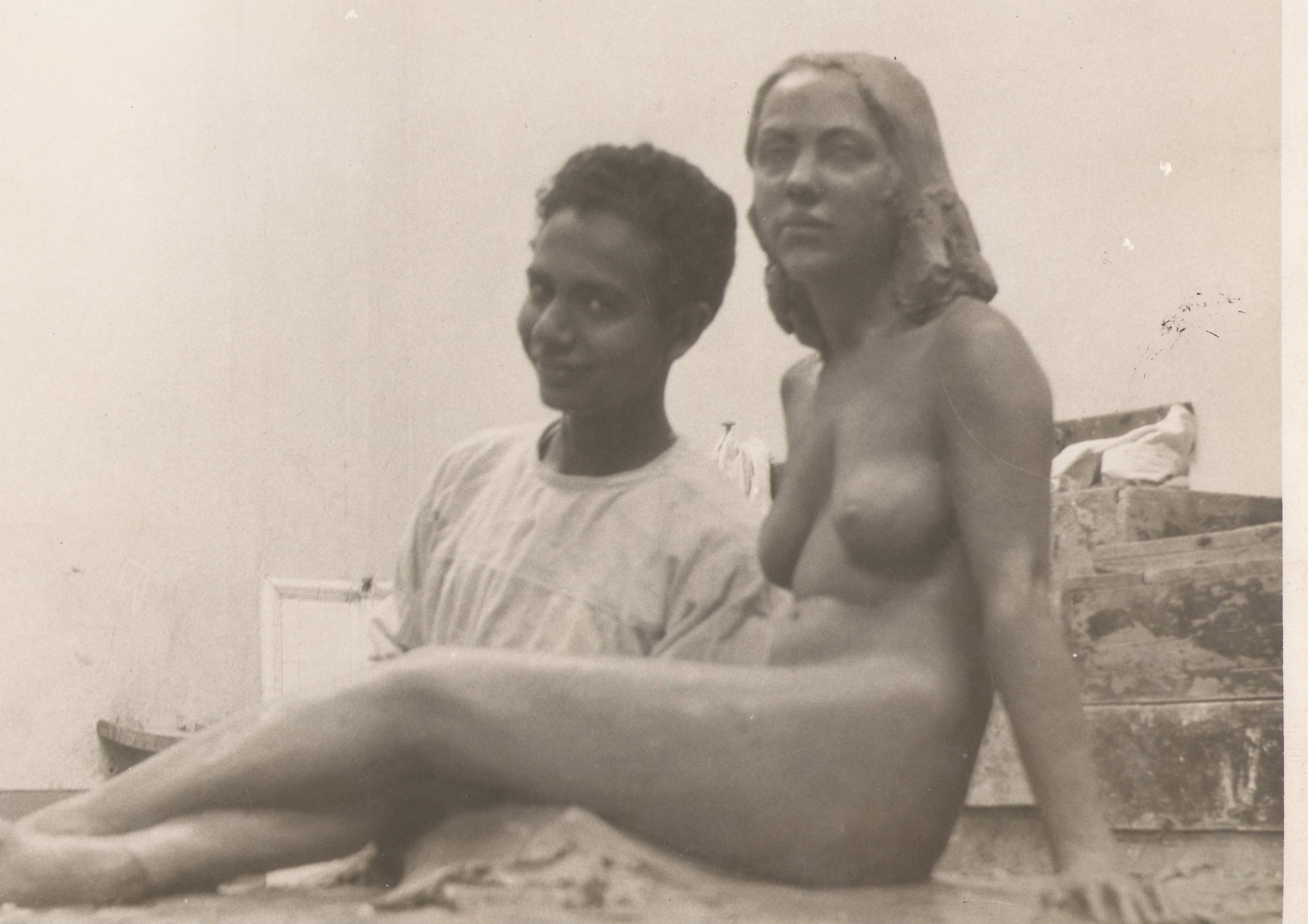
A young and passionate Sagini standing beside one of his statues

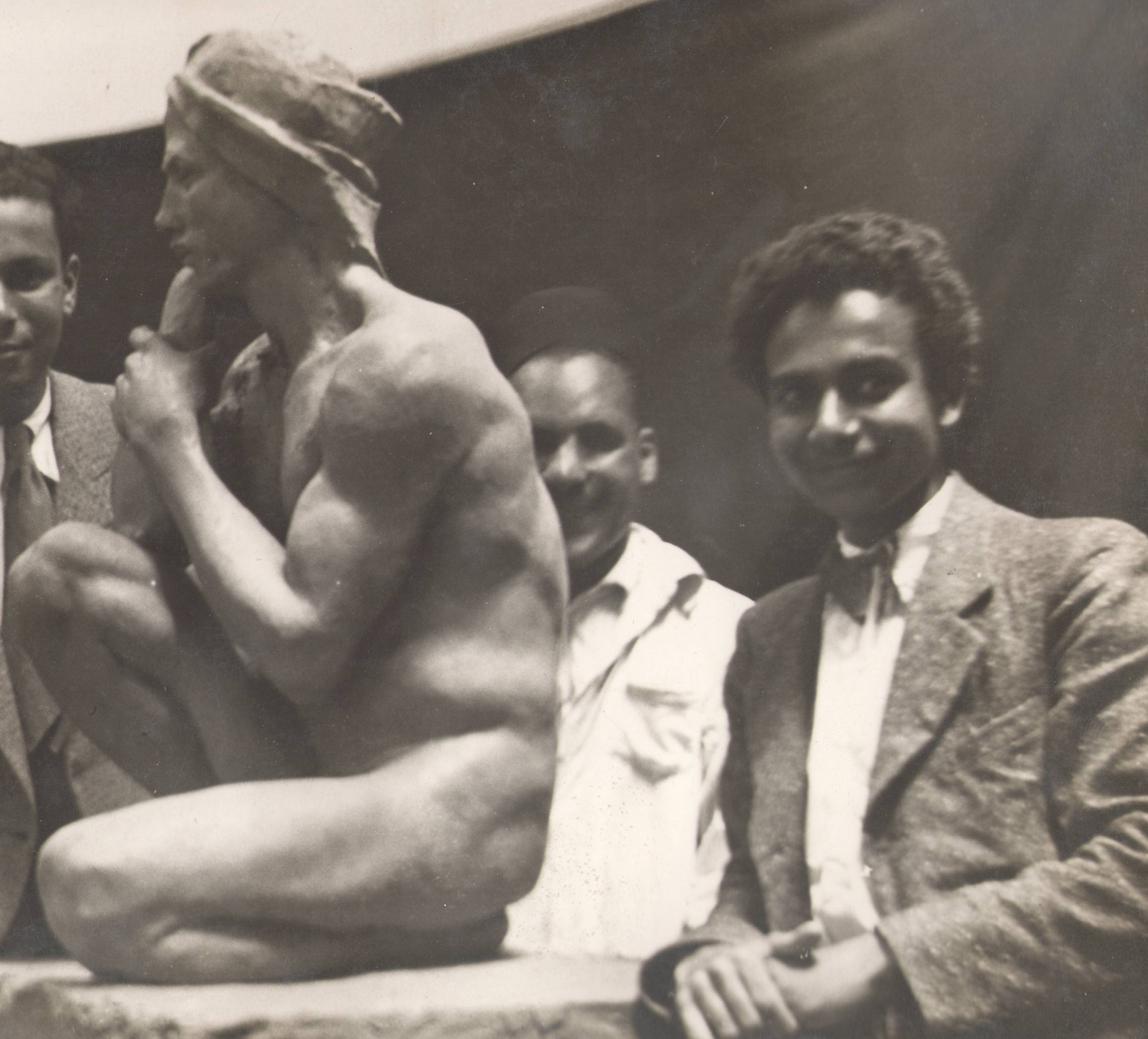
A Young Sagini (Right) during one of his First Exhibitions

Born on January 7, 1917, in Bab El Shaaria, a poor suburb of Cairo, Egypt, El-Sagini discovered his passion for art at a very early age where he grew fond of the architectural nature of old Cairo such as domes, mosques and Islamic architecture which led him in 1934 to join the sculpture department at the First school of Fine Arts founded by prince Youssef Kamal. Guided and mentored by great artists teaching sculpture in Cairo at the time, El-Sagini earned his diploma in sculpture in 1938. El Sagini traveled to Paris at his own expense to pursue higher studies where he was greatly affected by English sculptor Henry Moore who was best known for his abstract technique and reclining figures. El Sagini followed this in 1947 by traveling to Rome to resume his post graduate studies where he received a diploma in Sculpture and Medal Arts in 1950.

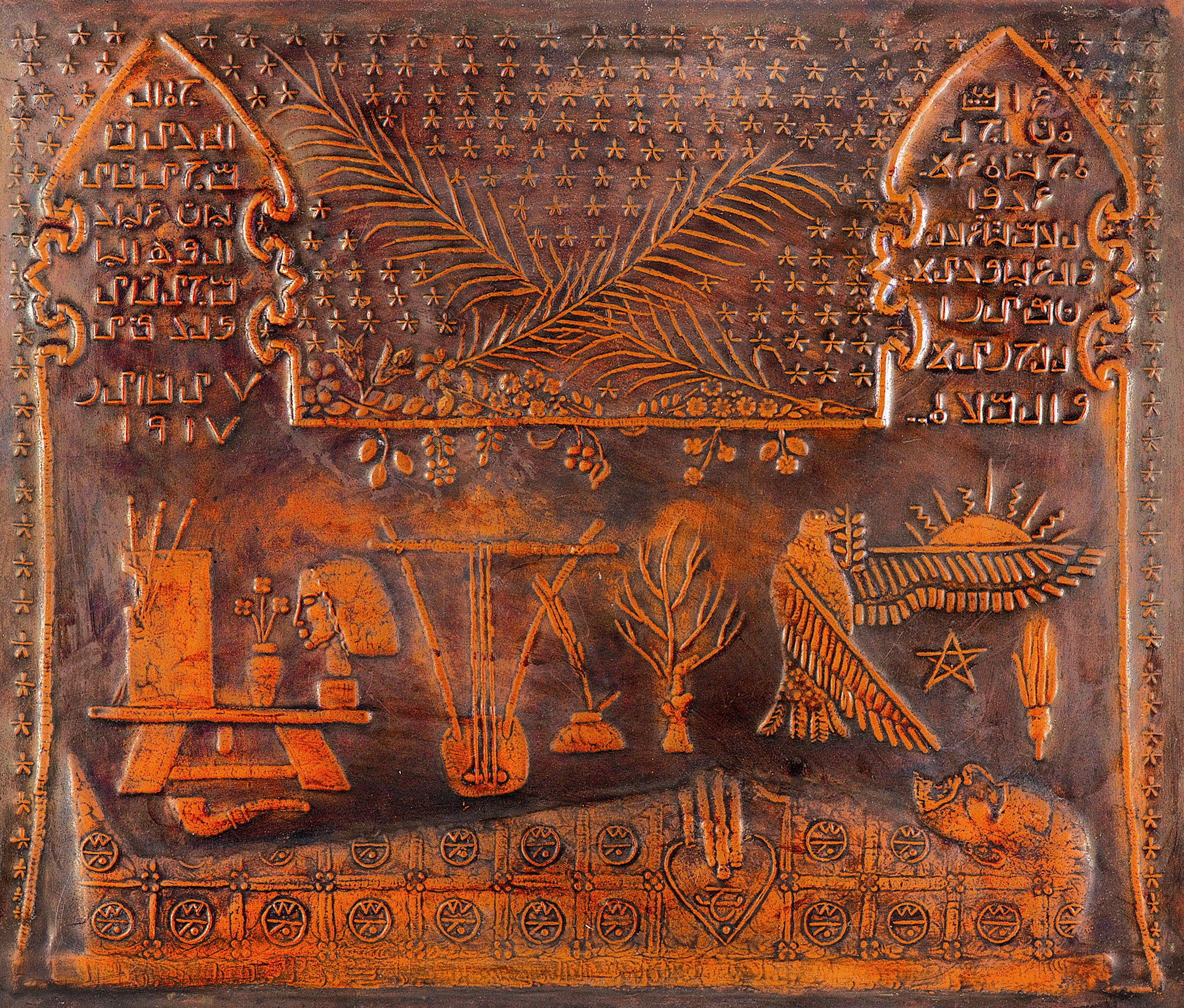
The Will

== His Message ==
El-Sagini reflected his thoughts of a better future for his country Egypt through his work and he summarized his reason in life through "The Will" (Hammered copper relief-33x28cm-1954) where he pictured himself – like in the times of pharaohs – in his grave surrounded by all the things he stood for and cherished during his lifetime such as love, hope, art and music. On the headstone he wrote the following words that describe his life and what he stood for:

Gamal El Sagini, Son of Abdel Wahab El Sagini, Born January 7th 1917

Lived For His Society, An Enemy of Exploitation and Slavery

A Strong Believer in Freedom and Peace

== Egypt ==
Constantly concerned with his home country's issues, El-Sagini featured Egypt in most of his works expressing hope, encouragement, disappointment or just pure unconditional love. Introducing symbolism in Egyptian sculpture, El-Sagini used different symbols of Egypt during times of joy, despair, victory and defeat.

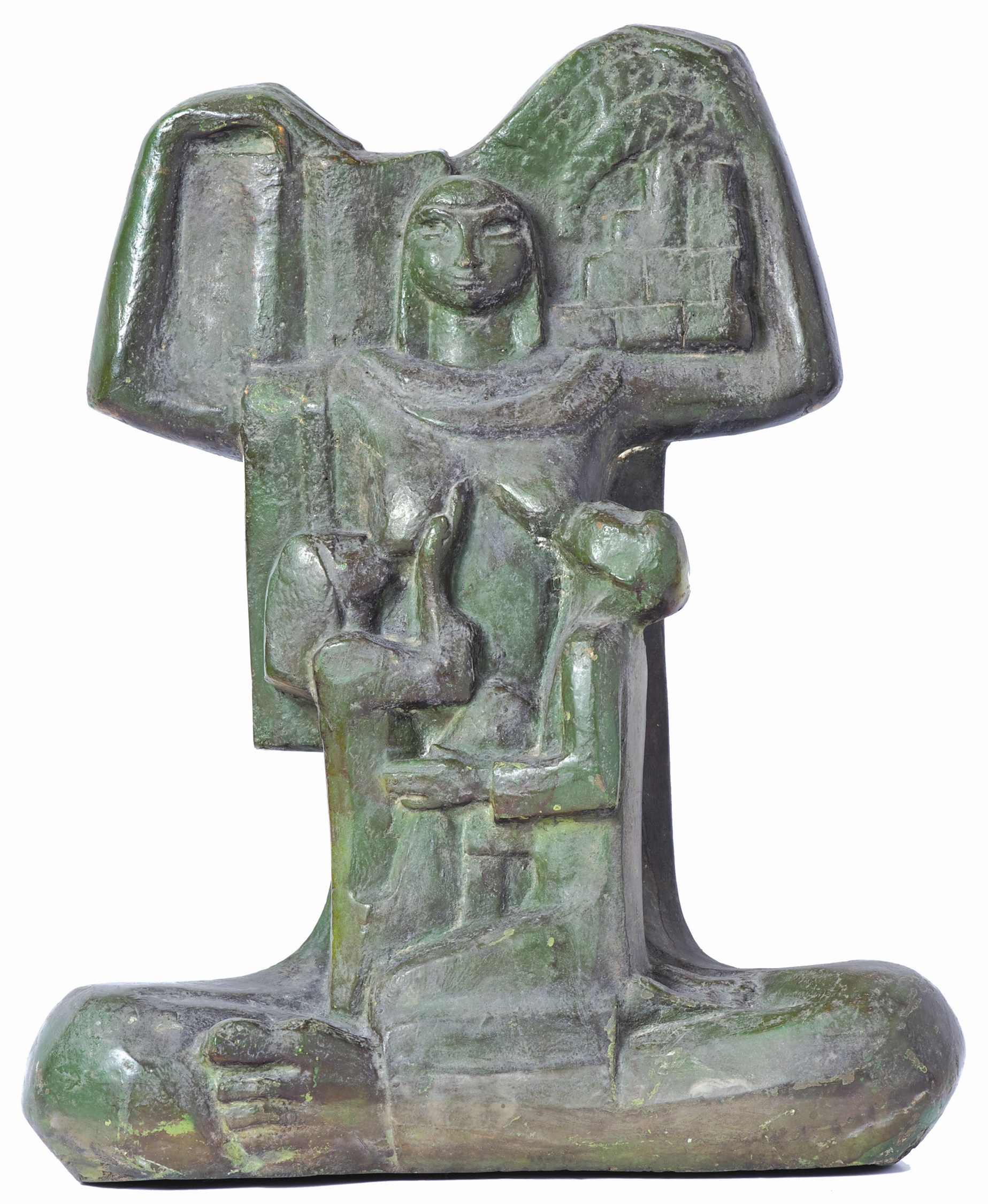
Egypt My Mother Land

In the period 1952-1967, following the Egyptian revolution of 1952, Egypt played a leading role in the Arab world under the leadership of Egyptian president and revolutionary icon Gamal Abdel Nasser. The Egyptian revolution was a spark that triggered what turned out to be a series of independence revolutions in the Arab world.

In his statue "Egypt My Mother Land" (Bronze- 40x30x 10 cm-1957) El-Sagini symbolized Egypt as the giving mother of the entire Arab world featuring a mother breastfeeding her infants while holding over her shoulders symbols of prosperity (wheat stem), development (bricks Built) and culture (book).

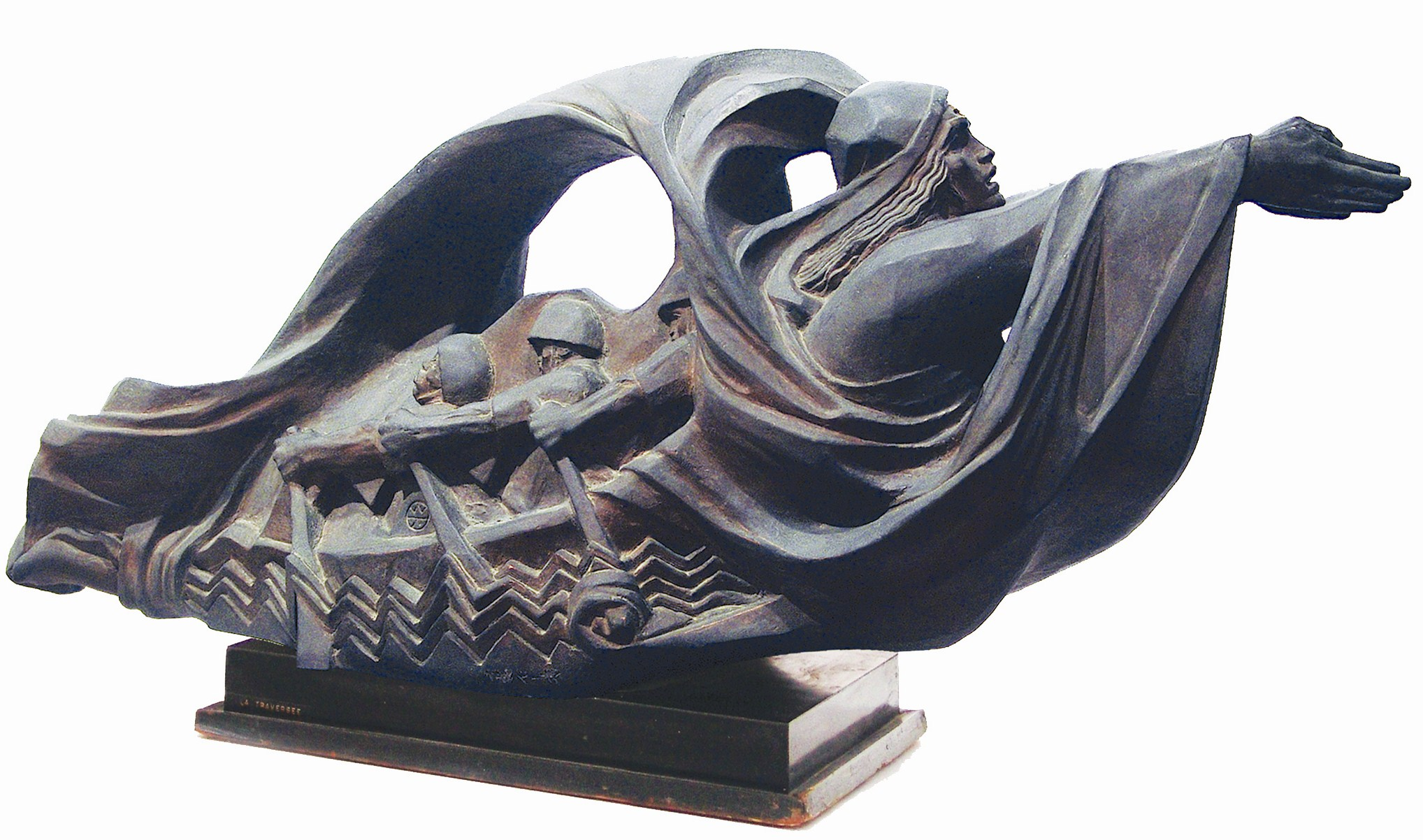
The Great Crossing of The Suez Canal

As a result of the Six-Day War 1967 and the nationwide feeling of frustration and despair, El-Sagini often featured Egypt in his paintings of that period as a candy doll – a famous symbol in Egyptian carnivals– that is crippled, tortured or even hanged.

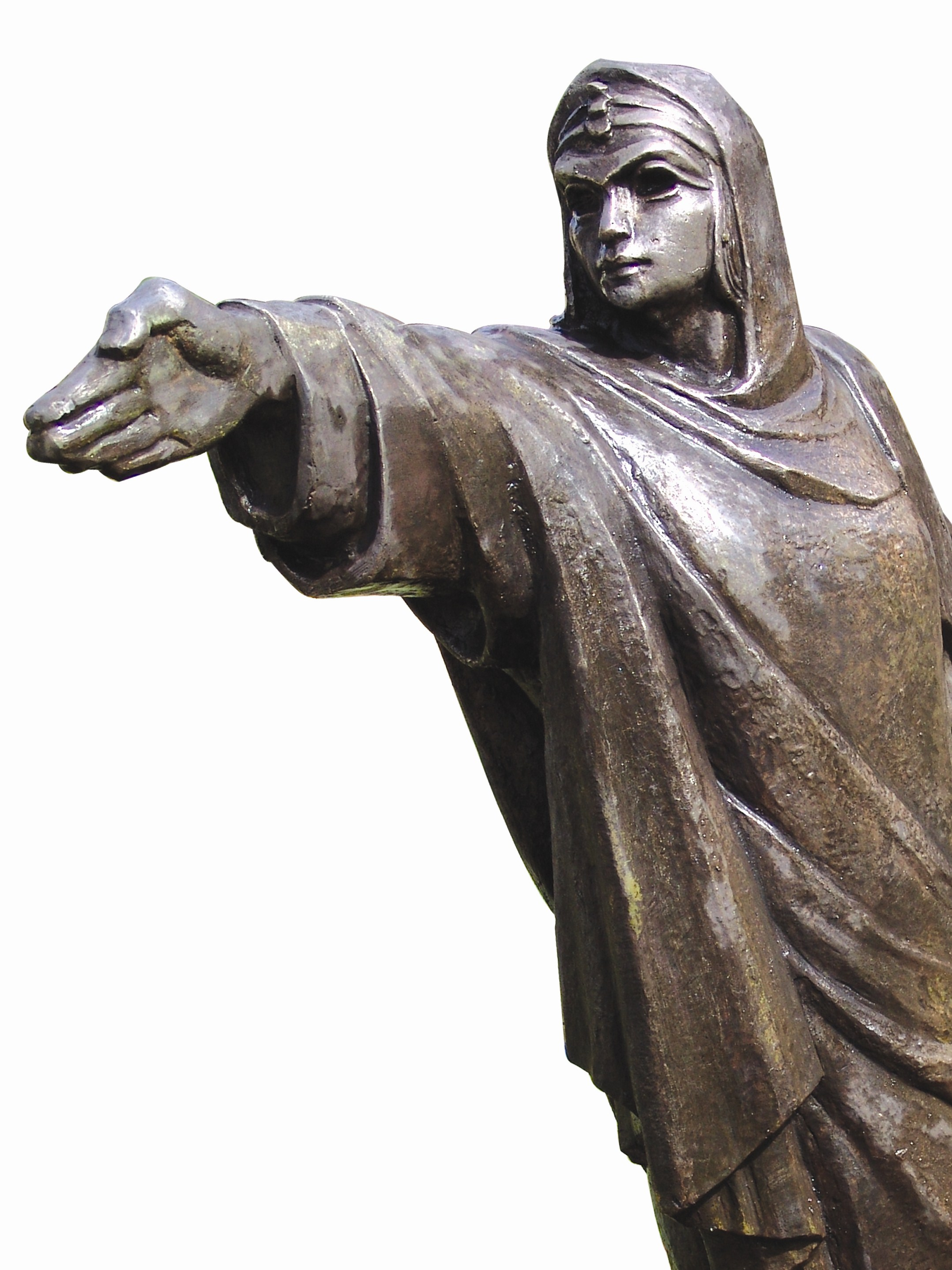
El Sagini’s statue "Egypt The Future"

Following the Yom Kippur War 1973 and the blood pumping again into Egypt's and the whole Arab world's veins, El-Sagini pictured Egypt as a beautiful woman with strong facial features in two of his most expressive statues of that era in Egypt's modern history, In his statue "The Great Crossing of The Suez Canal" (Bronze- 33x127x 38 cm-1973) El-Sagini pictures the Egyptian soldiers in a ship –Egypt– rowing relentlessly to cross the Suez Canal.

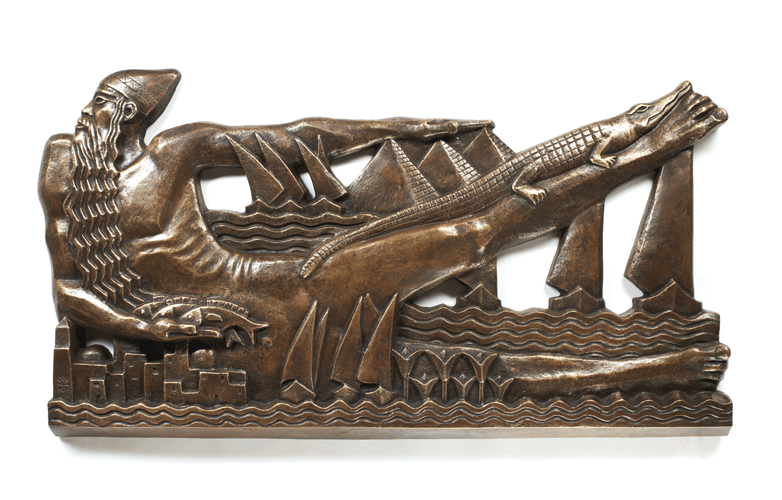
"The Nile" by Gamal El-Sagini

El Sagini's second statue "Egypt, The Future" (Bronze- 90x80x 30 cm-1975) features a woman –Egypt– standing proudly in an expressive position that shows strength, hope and determination towards a better future.

== The River Nile ==
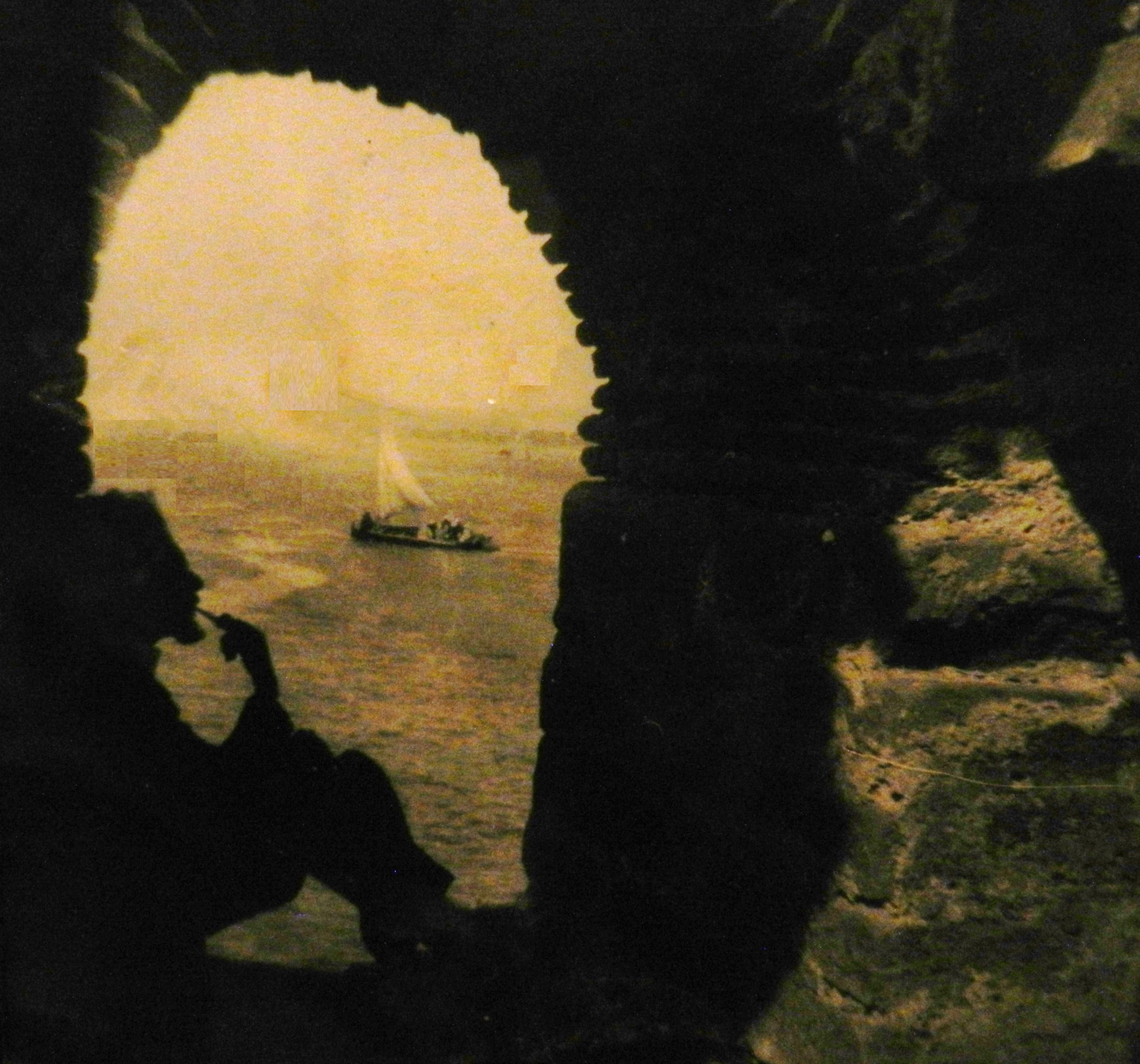
El-Sagini by the River Nile

El Sagini always saw the River Nile as the symbol of prosperity and well being picturing the Nile as an old bearded man in his Statue "The Nile" (Bronze- 100x50x8 cm-1958), yet he also considered it his source of solace and relief.

El Sagini's special relation with the river Nile was clearly pictured in 1969 when he decided as an act of rebellion to throw some of his sculptures in the Nile as a result of the state's lack of recognition and support as his statues were piling up in his atelier instead of standing tall in the streets and squares of Egypt.

This unprecedented act of rebellion took the Egyptian art scene by storm and made the Egyptian society think about every artist's true passion and purpose of the work he is creating. This purpose is simply to get the artist's work to be seen by others, feeding the viewers’ minds and souls, making them think, dream, enjoy and sometimes change.

== Death ==
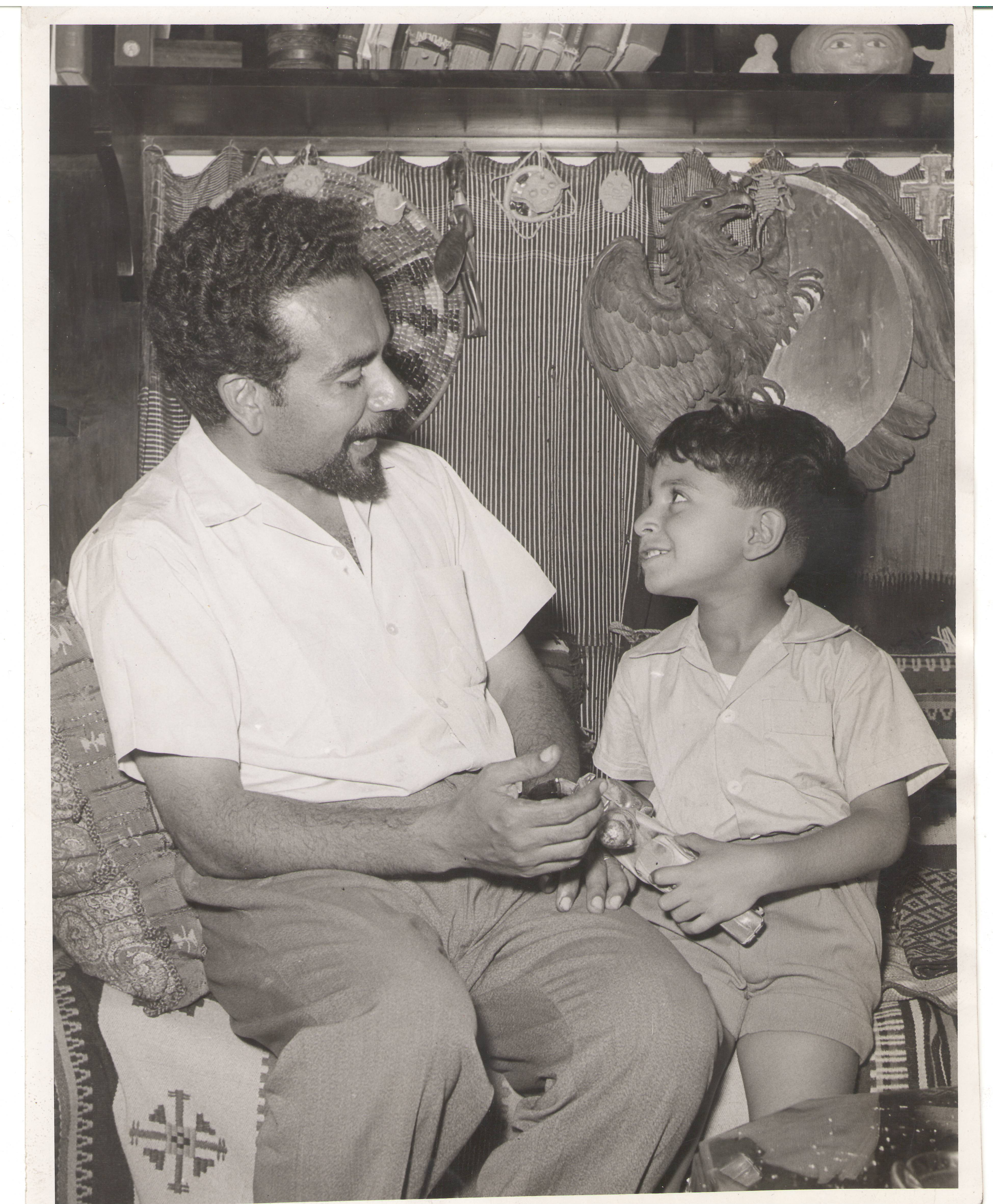
El-Sagini with his only son Magd

In 1977 El Sagini traveled to Spain for a comprehensive exhibition of his works organized by the Egyptian General Organization for Information held in Madrid and then Barcelona, where he died on November 17 at the age of 60. His body was accompanied by his wife – Hoda – back to Egypt where he was buried at the family cemetery in Cairo.

== Prizes ==
El Sagini working on Abdel Halim Hafez statue

El Sagini received several prizes and honors such as:

1. The "Mokhtar" Trophy for Sculpture – 1937
2. The Honorary Title "Cavaliero" (Knight) from the Italian Government
3. Science and Art Prize from the Egyptian Government
4. The First Prize in the High Council for the Support of Arts and Literature Competition
5. Egypt's Prestigious Award presented by Former President Gamal Abdel Nasser – 1962
6. Italy's Medal of Honor presented by the Italian Ambassador in Egypt - 1963
7. First Place in the Alexandria Biennial Exhibition for Mediterranean Countries
8. First Place in the International Moscow Exhibition
9. First Place in the International Brussels Exhibition

== Main exhibitions ==
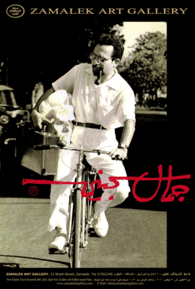
Gamal El-Sagini ZAG Poster 2010

- Venice Biennial
- Seattle International Exhibition
- Alexandria Biennial for Mediterranean Countries
- China International Exhibition
- International Moscow Exhibition -1957
- International Brussels Exhibition – 1958
- Mediterranean Studies Center Exhibition – Madrid/Barcelona, Spain 1977
- Extra Gallery – Cairo 1996
- Safar Khan Gallery - Cairo 1999
- Zamalek Art Gallery – Cairo 2010
- Zamalek Art Gallery – Cairo 2012
- Zamalek Art Gallery – Cairo 2013
- Zamalek Art Gallery – Cairo 2015
- Centennial Retrospective Exhibition at the Mahmoud Mokhtar Museum and Zamalek Art Gallery - Cairo 2017

== Main Acquisitions ==
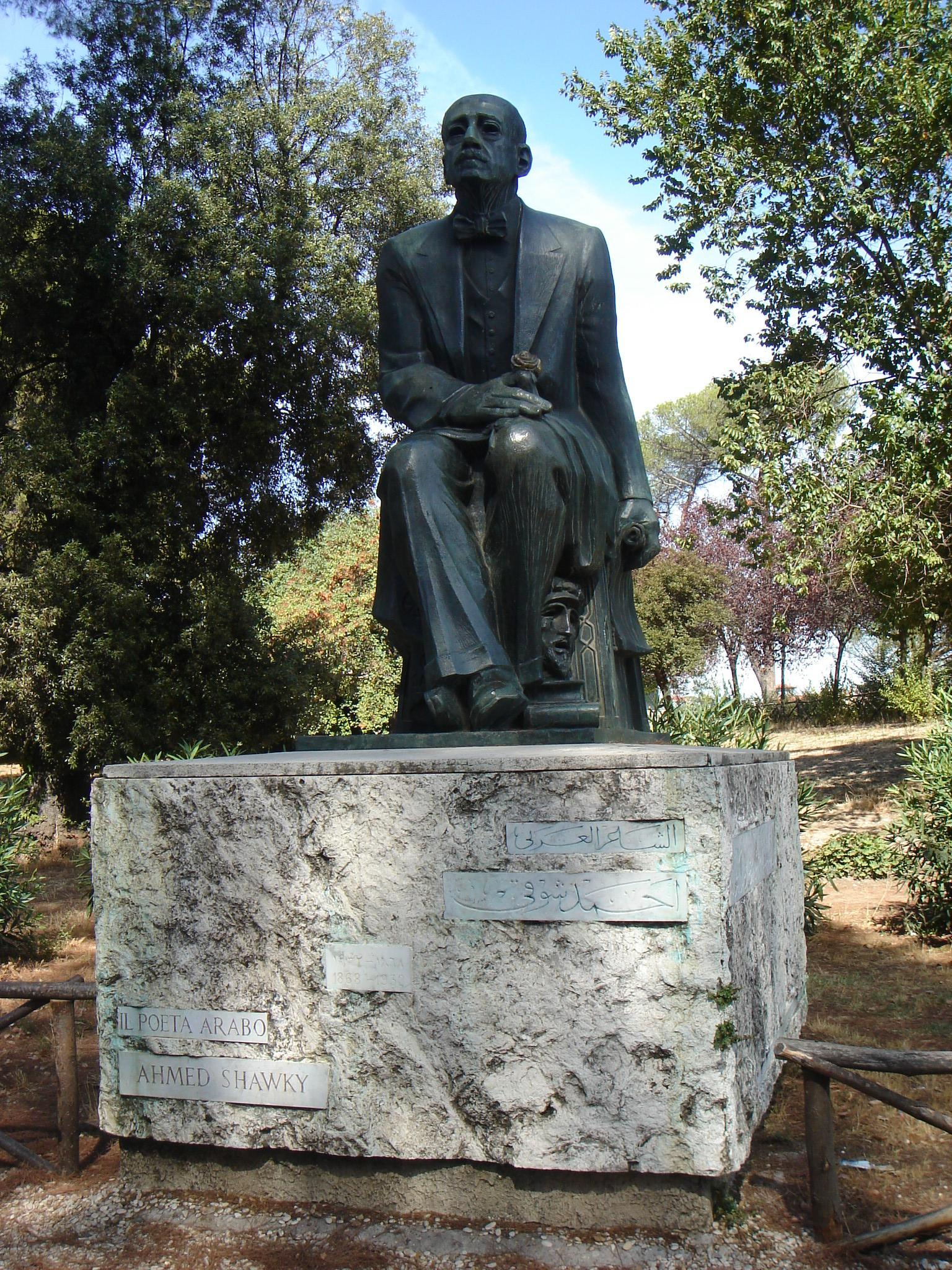
El-Sagini's Statue of Egyptian Poet Ahmed Shawqi in Villa Borghese, Rome

- Museum of Modern Egyptian Art - Cairo, Egypt
- Gamal Abdel Nasser Museum - Cairo, Egypt
- Oriental Art Museum – Moscow, Russia
- Pushkin State Museum of Arts – Moscow, Russia
- State Museum of the History of Russian Literature – Moscow, Russia
- Beijing Museum – Beijing, China
- Ahmed Shawqi statue in Villa Borghese Gardens – Rome, Italy
- New York Public Library – NY, US
- Museum of Islamic Ceramics - Cairo, Egypt
- Dalloul Art Foundation – Beirut, Lebanon
