= Ahmed Shawqi =

Egyptian poet (1868–1932)

Ahmed Shawki أحمد شوقي Amīr al-Shu‘arā’
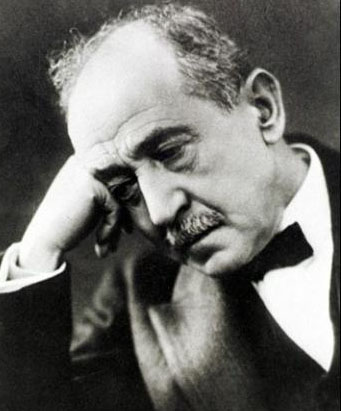
- Portrait of Ahmed Shawqi.
- Born: October 17, 1868; Cairo, Khedivate of Egypt
- Died: October 14, 1932 (aged 63); Cairo, Kingdom of Egypt
- Education: University of Paris; Université Montpellier
- Occupations: Poet, playwright
- Writing career
- Language: Arabic
- Genres: Poem; drama; prose
- Movement: Arab Neoclassicism

Ahmed Shawqi (Arabic: أحمد شوقي, ALA-LC: Aḥmad Shawqī, Egyptian Arabic pronunciation: [ˈʔæħmæd ˈʃæwʔi]; 1868–1932), nicknamed the Prince of Poets (Arabic: أمير الشعراء Amīr al-Shu‘arā’), was an Egyptian poet laureate, linguist, and one of the most famous Arabic literary writers of the modern era in the Arab World.

== Life ==
Shawqi was born in Cairo on October 17, 1868, to a wealthy family of mixed Egyptian, Circassian, Turkish, Kurdish, and Greek roots, with his father tracing their origins to the Kurds. His family was prominent and well-connected with the court of the Khedive Ismael of Egypt.

At the age of four, he joined a kuttab in the Sayyida Zeinab neighborhood, memorising there parts of the Holy Qur'an and learning the principles of reading and writing.

Upon graduating from high school, he attended law school for two years, before joining the then-recently founded school of translation, which aimed to train civil servants. After obtaining a degree in translation, Shawqi was offered a job in the court of the Khedive Abbas II which he immediately accepted.

After a year working in the court of the Khedive, Shawqi was sent to continue his studies in law at the Universities of Montpellier and Paris for three years. While in France, he was heavily influenced by the works of French playwrights, most notably Molière and Racine. Upon his return to Egypt in 1894, Shawqi became close to Abbas II of Egypt, and was appointed "Head of the Foreign Pen" (Arabic: القلم الأفرنجي) in the Khedive's office, a rank comparable to the modern Minister of Foreign Affairs. He was assigned to represent the Egyptian government at the Orientalist Conference held in Geneva, until World War I broke out and the British deposed of the Khedive.

Forced into exile for his outspoken opposition to the British, he was exiled to Andalusia, Spain in 1914. Shawqi remained there until 1920, when he returned to Egypt. In 1927 he was crowned by his peers Amir al-Sho’araa’ (literally, "the Prince of Poets") in recognition of his considerable contributions to the literary field.

He used to live in 'Karmet Ibn Hani' or Ibn Hani's Vineyard at Al-Matariyyah area near the palace of the Khedive Abbas II at Saray El-Qobba until he was exiled. After returning to Egypt he built a new house at Giza which he named the new Karmet Ibn Hani, today the Ahmad Shawqi Museum. He met Mohammed Abdel Wahab, and introduced him for the first time to art, making him his protégé as he gave him a suite in his house.

== Work ==
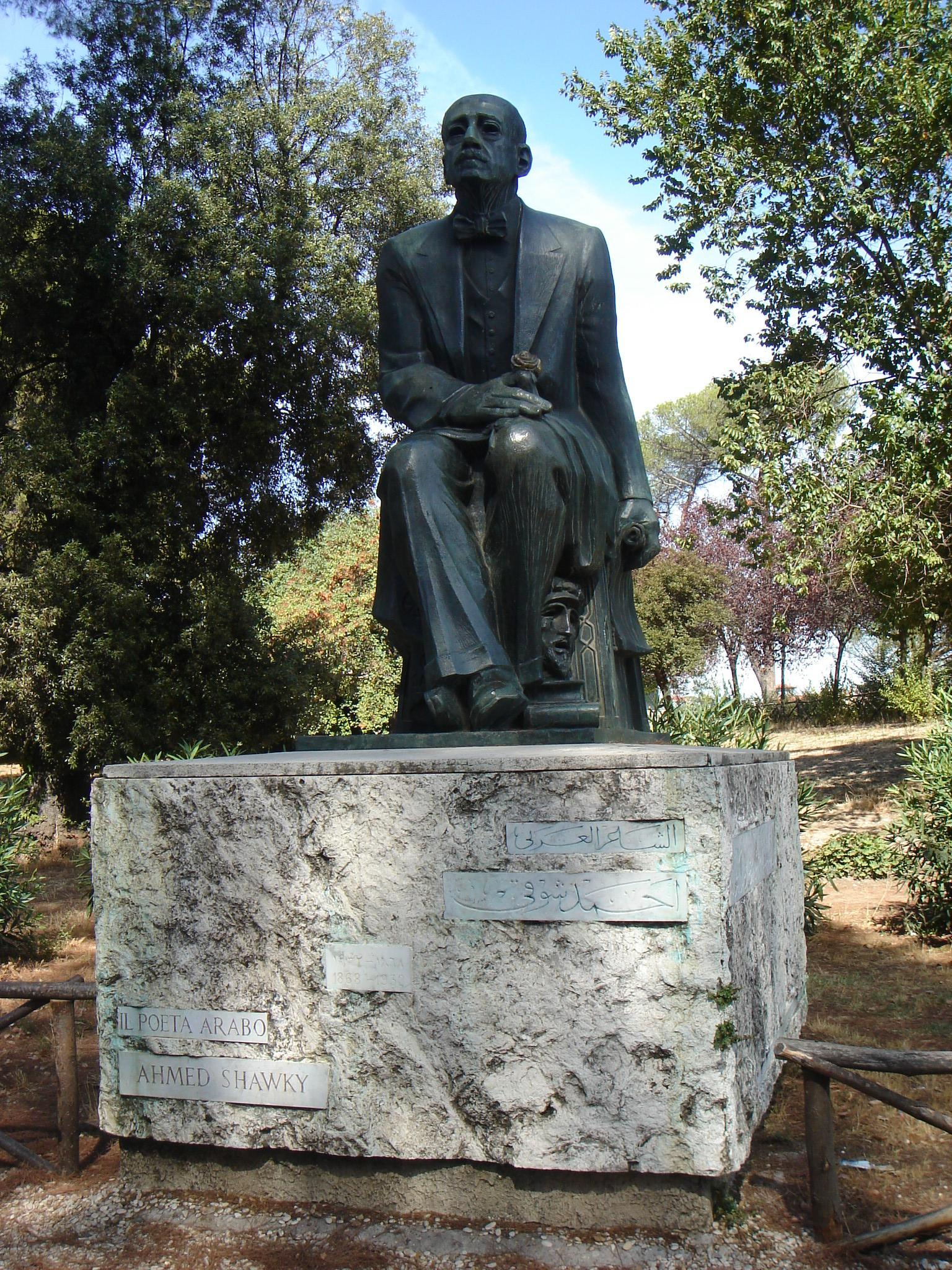
Monument of Shawqi in Villa Borghese, Rome by Egyptian Sculptor Gamal El-Sagini

Shawqi's work can be categorized into three main periods during his career. The first coincides with the period during which he occupied a position at the court of the Khedive, consisting of eulogies to the Khedive: praising him or supporting his policy. The second comprised the period of his exile in Spain. During this period, his feeling of nostalgia and sense of alienation directed his poetic talent to patriotic poems on Egypt as well as the Arab world and panarabism. The third stage occurred after his return from exile, during that period he became preoccupied with the glorious history of Ancient Egypt and Islam. This was the period during which he wrote his religious poems, in praise of the Islamic prophet Muhammad. The maturation of his poetic style was also reflected in his plays, the most notable of which were published during this period.

Shawqi frequently addressed the topic of the Crusades glorifying Salah al-Din. The most well known poems of this kind are Kibār al-ḥawādith fī wādī al-nīl (The Greatest Events in the Nile Valley) and ‘Aẓīm al-nās man yabkī al-‘iẓām (Great is the one who mourns the great).

=== Plays ===
Shawqi was the first in modern Arabic literature to write poetic plays. He wrote five tragedies:

- Majnun Laila ("Layla's mad lover"), his first play.
- The Death of Cleopatra
- 'Antara
- Ali beh el-Kebeer
- Kambeez (Cambyses II), 1931

and two comedies:

- El-Set Huda (Madame Huda)
- El-Bakhila (the Miser-ette)

in addition to a prose play: the Princess of Andalusia.

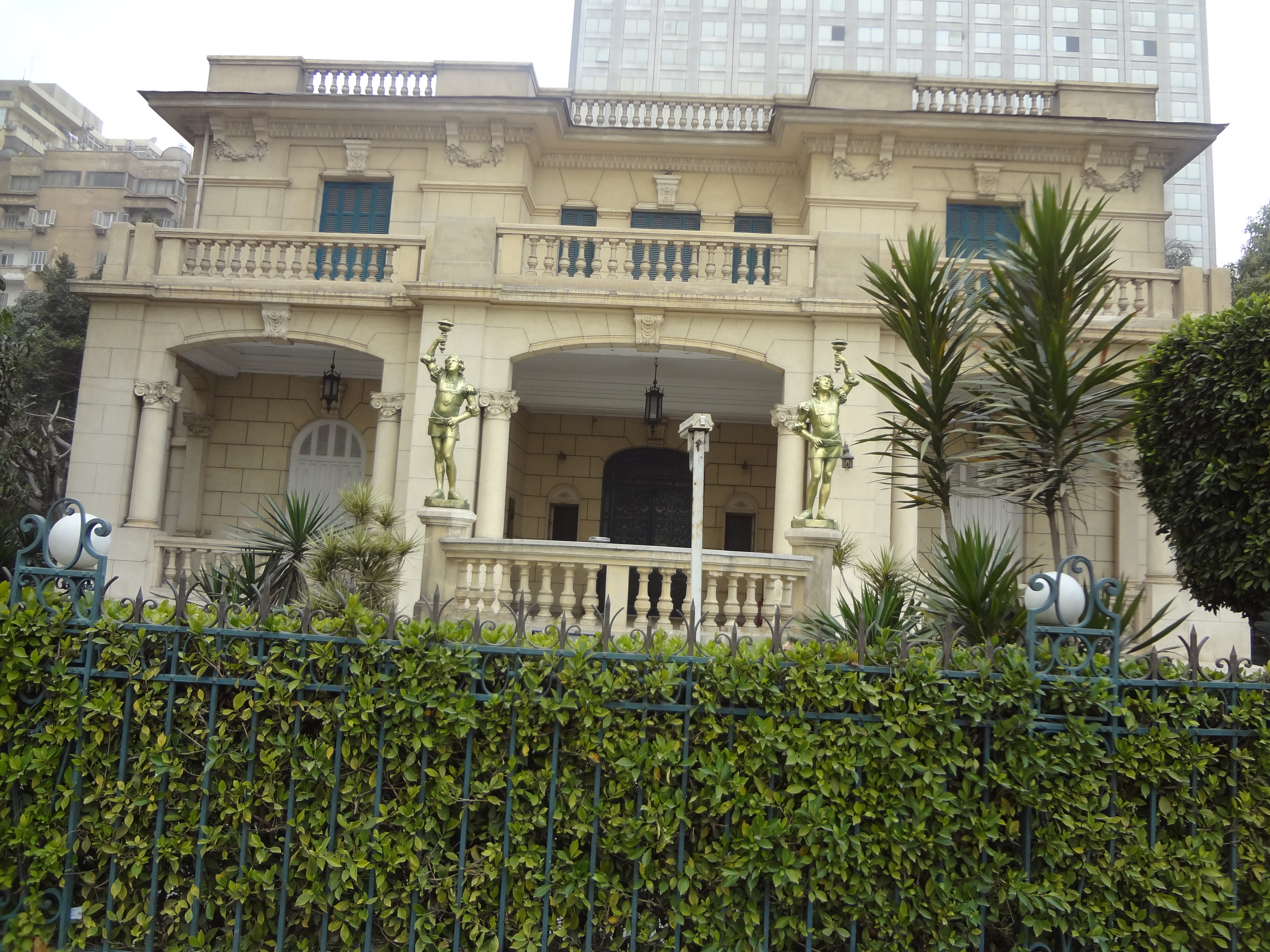
Ahmed Shawki Museum, Egypt

=== Poetry ===
- Esh-Shawqiyyat, his selected works, in four volumes, including Nahj al-Burda, a tribute to Muhammad.
- The States of Arabs and the Great Men of Islam, A long poem about the History of Islam.
- Poetic Stories for Children, inspired by the famous French fabulist Jean de La Fontaine.

=== Prose ===
He also wrote chapters of prose, collected under the title The Markets of Gold.

== Criticism ==
Ahmed Shawqi is considered as "the greatest" poet within the Arabic Neoclassicist movement by scholars.

Shawqi's work was a part of some of the Nahda's main literary and cultural debates, in which tradition, authenticity, and formality were positioned against experimentation, vulgarity, and Westernization.Shawqi faced sharp criticism from writers such as Muhammad al-Muwaylihi, who saw Shawqi's innovative work, particularly after the publication of ash-Shawqiyat, as heretical, boastful, vulgar, Westernized, and unworthy of the proud tradition of classical Arabic poetry.

== Legacy ==
Karmat Ibn Hani', Ahmed Shawqi's home in Giza, was converted into the Ahmed Shawki Museum on 17 June 1977.

Shawqi's work is regularly celebrated at the El Sawy Culture Wheel, a cultural center in Cairo.

The web search engine company Google uploaded a Google Doodle, a limited-time variant of their logo, to memorialize Shawqi in advance of what would have been his 142nd birthday on 16 October 2010. The art featured a quote from Shawqi's poetry in place of the "oo" in the Google logo, which in English translates to:

My homeland is always in my mind even if I were in paradise.

There are two roads named for Ahmed Shawqi in Giza: Ahmed Shawqi Street, where the Ahmed Shawqi Museum is located; and Ahmed Shawqi Corridor. A number of statues have been created in the likeness of Shawqi, including one on Dokki Street in Giza and another at the Villa Borghese in Rome.

Shawqi's granddaughter Ikbal El-Alailly was a central figure in Egypt's surrealist poetry movement. His other granddaughter Khadiga Riad was an abstract, surrealist painter. An Egyptian postage stamp was issued in honour of Shawqi on 14 October 1957 to commemorate 25 years since his death. Many books have been written on the life of Ahmed Shawqi. He is the maternal great-grandfather of Amina Taha-Hussein Okada (who is also, through her father, the granddaughter of writer Taha Hussein), the chief curator of the Indian section at the Guimet Museum in Paris.
