= Hijazi =

Hijazi, Hijazy, Hejazi or Hegazy (Arabic: حجازي) is an Arabic surname originally designating a person (or their ancestor) from the Hejaz region in Saudi Arabia.

== People ==
=== Hijazi ===
- Abdallah Hijazi, Lebanese basketball player
- Ahmed Hijazi (poet), Egyptian contemporary poet
- Ali Hijazi, Sierra Leonean basketball player
- Amal Hijazi, Lebanese singer
- Farouk Hijazi, Iraqi diplomat
- Fouad Hijazi, Lebanese footballer
- Naseem Hijazi, Urdu novelist
- Nawal Hijazi, Lebanese voice actress
- Zane Hijazi, American Vine creator and YouTuber, member of David Dobrik's Vlog Squad

=== Hejazi ===
- Abdol Hossein Hejazi (1904–1969), Iranian military officer
- Attila Hejazi, Iranian football player and coach
- Mohammad Hejazi, Iranian military commander
- Nasser Hejazi, Iranian football goalkeeper

== See also ==
- Hejazi Arabic
- Hejazi turban
