= Ahmed Hegazi (disambiguation) =

Ahmed Hegazi (born 1991) is an Egyptian footballer.

Ahmed Hegazi may also refer to:

- Ahmed Hegazi (actor) (1935–2002), Egyptian actor
- Ahmed Gaffer Hegazi (born 1948), Egyptian professor of microbiology and immunology
- Ahmed Hegazy (pharmacist), Egyptian-German pharmacist
- Ahmad Hegazi, Egyptian satirical cartoonist

== See also ==
- Ahmed Hijazi (disambiguation)
