= Cavafy Award =

Award presented to creative writers from Egypt and Greece

- Description: Honor presented to creative writers from Egypt and Greece in the fields of poetry, short stories, and literary criticism
- Country: Egypt / Greece

The Cavafy Award is an honor presented to creative writers from Egypt and Greece in the fields of poetry, short stories, and literary criticism.

First awarded in 1990, the prize was established to foster cultural relations between Egypt and Greece. Notable recipients include Egyptian writer Naguib Mahfouz, who received the award on his 92nd birthday, as well as Farouk Shousha, Sayyid Hijab, Ibrahim Aslan, Radwa Ashour, Sahar El Mougy, and Bahaa Taher.

The award is named after the Greek poet Constantine Cavafy, who was born in and lived in Alexandria, Egypt until his death.

== History ==
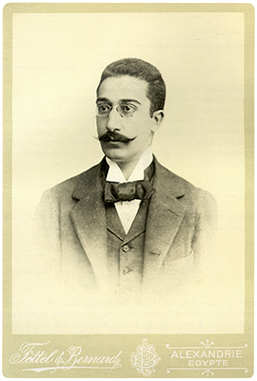
The Greek poet Constantine Cavafy

In 1983, unique cultural celebrations were held for the first time in the cities of Alexandria and Cairo, commemorating the 50th anniversary of the death of the Greek poet Constantine Cavafy, the poet of Alexandria. These events, known as "Cavafyia," were aimed at developing cultural relations between Greece and Egypt by highlighting the works of this Greek poet who lived in Alexandria from birth until his death and created all his works in the city he adored. The idea was supported by the Greek Minister of Culture, Melina Mercouri, and originated with Panayotis Vassilopoulos, the Greek Consul in Alexandria at the time. These celebrations quickly became one of the most important cultural events in Egypt.

== Award winners ==
Cavafy Award winners
Year	Country	Winner	Ref.
1989	Egypt	Ahmed Abdel Moati Hijazi	
1991	Egypt	Farouk Shousha	
2004	Egypt	Naguib Mahfouz	
2013	Egypt (United Arab Emirates) UAE	Maysoun Saqr (poet) and Mohamed El-Mansi Qandil (novelist)	
2017	Egypt	Farouk Gouida (poet), Radwa Ashour (novelist), and Sahar El Mougy (novelist)	
2011	Egypt	Amin Haddad, Ahdaf Soueif, and Bashir El-Sebaei	
2014	(United Arab Emirates) UAE	Maysoun Al Qasimi	
2017	Egypt	Sonallah Ibrahim and Mohamed El-Shahawi (poet)	
2019	Egypt	Ahmed Bakheet (Poetry), Youssef Noufel (Literary Criticism), and E'tidal Othman (Prose)	
