= Ahmed Hijazi =

Ahmed Hijazi (Arabic: أحمد حجازي), sometimes spelled Ahmad or Hegazi, may refer to:

- Ahmed Hijazi (poet) (born 1935), Egyptian contemporary poet
- Ahmed Hijazi (cartoonist) (1936–2011), Egyptian satirical cartoonist
- Ahmed Hijazi, alias of Kamal Derwish (1973–2002), American terrorist killed by CIA
- Ahmad Hijazi (born 1994), Lebanese professional footballer

== See also ==
- Ahmed Hegazi (disambiguation)
