= Yfantis =

Yfantis or Ifantis (Greek: Υφαντής) is a Greek occupational surname meaning "weaver". It may refer to:

- Elias Yfantis (born 1936), Greek footballer
- Yannis Yfantis (born 1949), Greek poet
