= Tanta =

City in Gharbia, Egypt

Tanta طنطا
- City
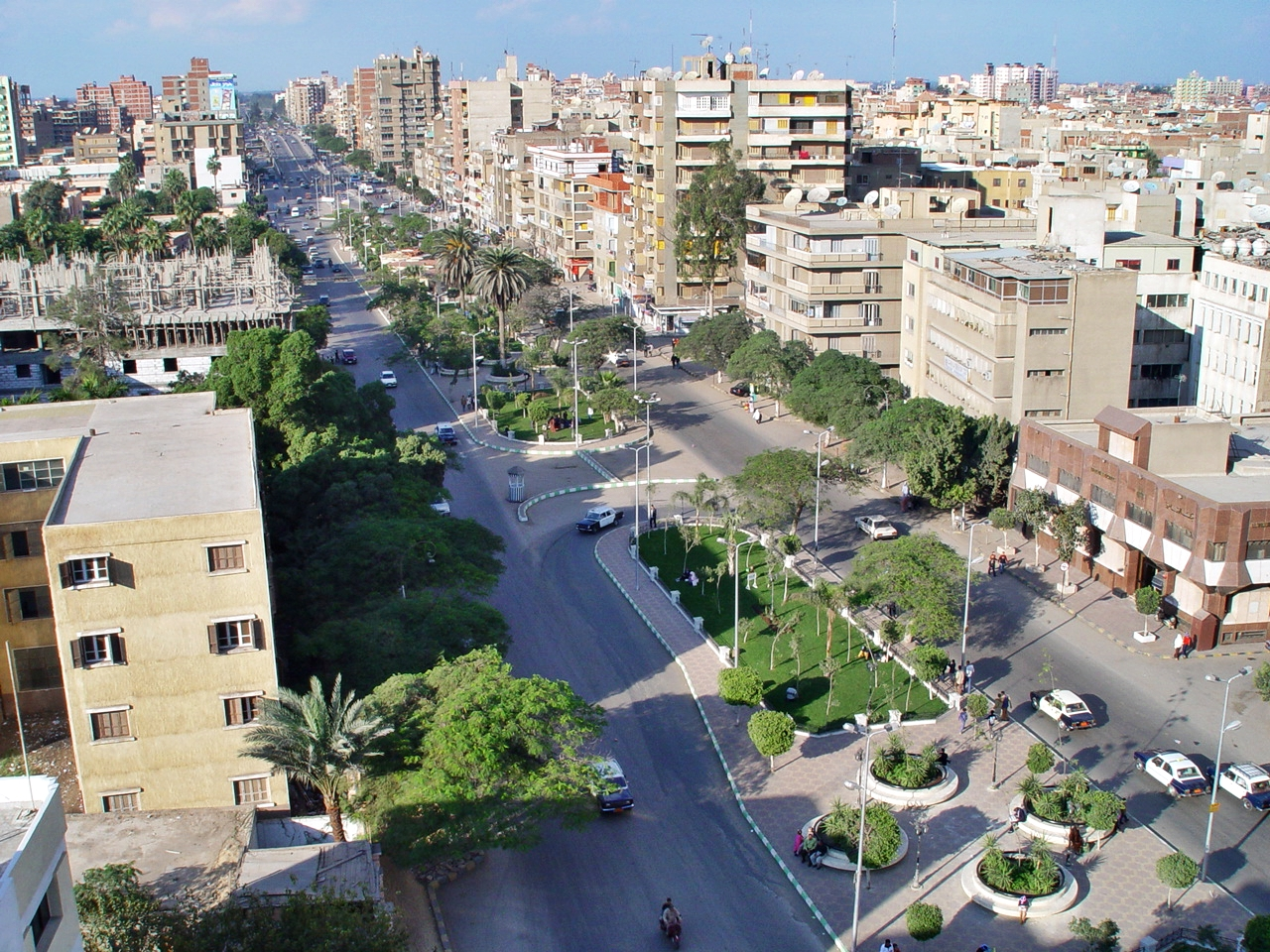
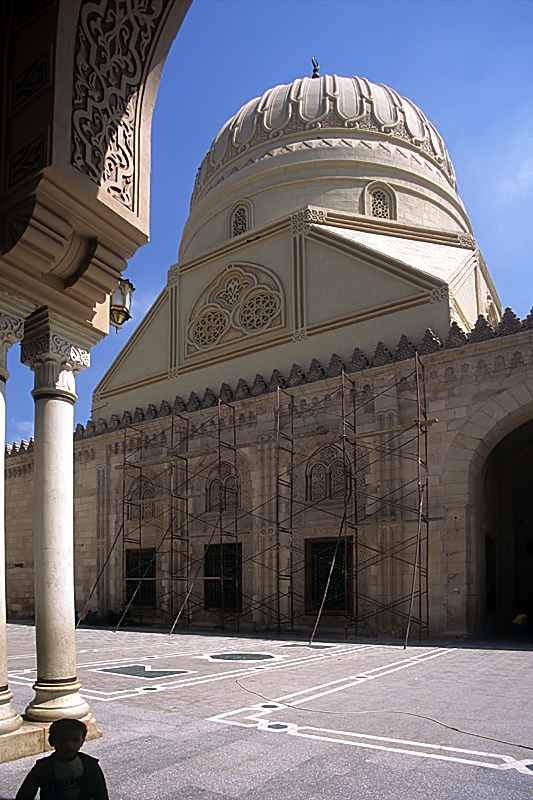
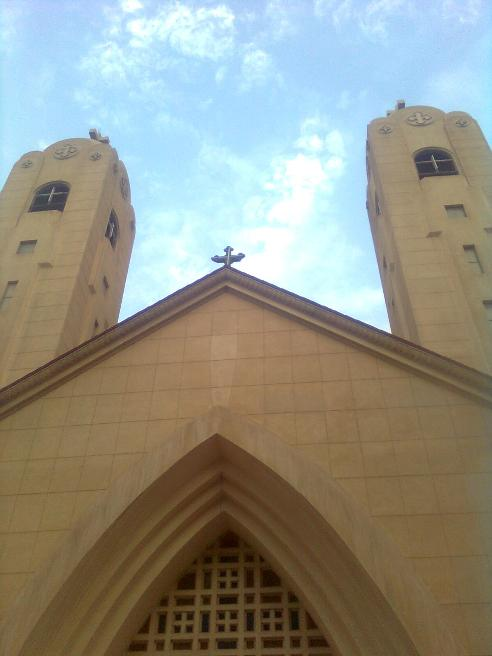
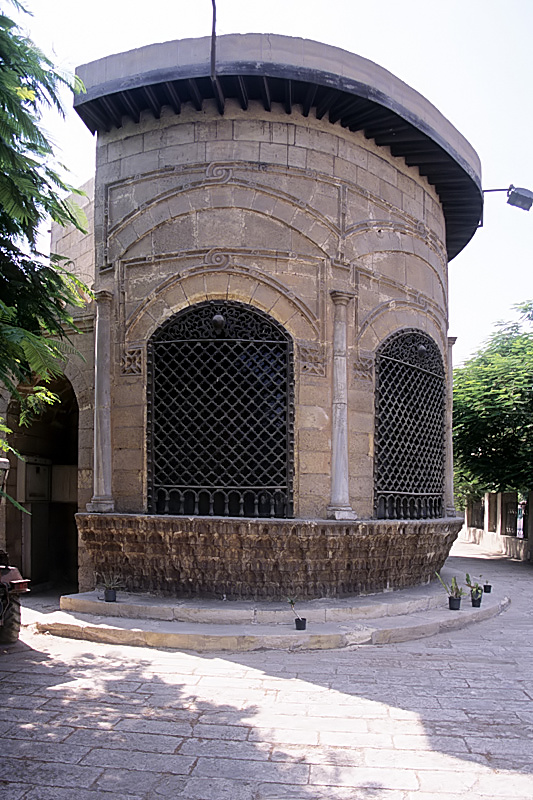
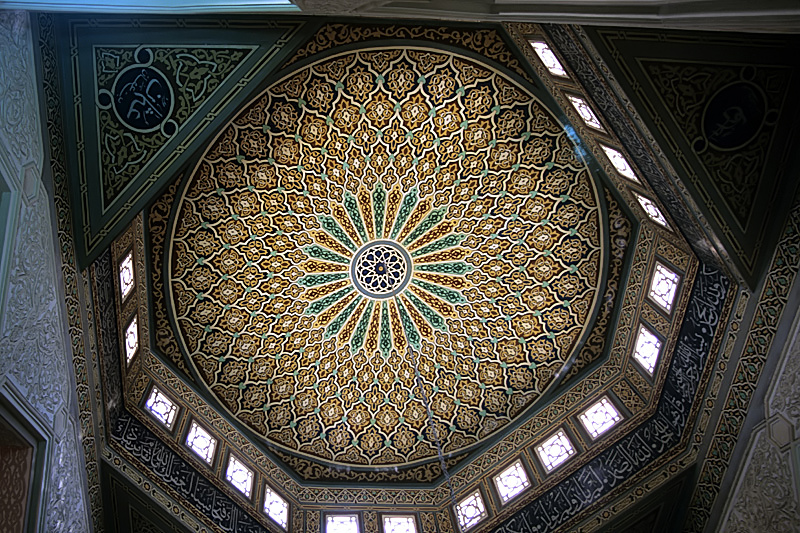
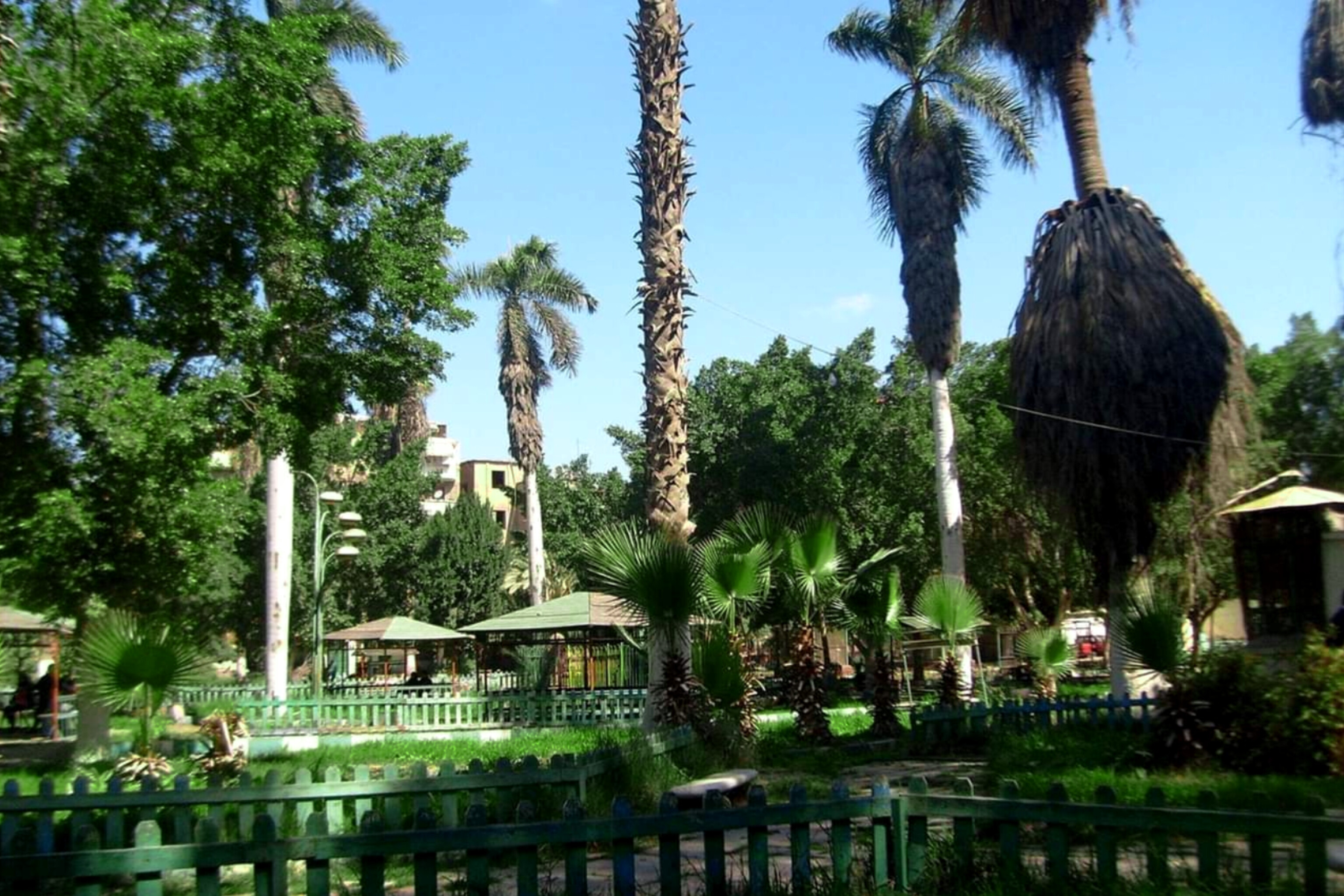
- Downtown Ahmad Al-Badawi Mosque Mary Girgis Church Sabil Ali-Bek Sheikha Sabah Mosque dome Tanta Zoo
- Nickname: Madinat Al-Saïd Al-Badawi
- Location of Tanta within Egypt
- Coordinates: 30°47′N 31°0′E
- Country: Egypt
- Governorate: Gharbia

Area
  - Total: 19.5 km^{2} (7.5 sq mi)
- Elevation: 12 m (39 ft)

Population (2024)
  - Total: 530,000
  - Density: 27,000/km^{2} (70,000/sq mi)
- Demonym(s): Tantawi (Male, Arabic: طنطاوي) Tantawiyah (Female, Arabic: طنطاوية)

GDP (nominal, constant 2015 values)
  - Year: 2024
  - Total: $2.8 billion
  - Per capita: $5,283
- Time zone: UTC+2 (EET)
  - Summer (DST): UTC+3 (EEST)
- Postal code: 31511
- Area code: (+20) 40

Tanta (Note: Arabic: طنطا, romanized: Ṭanṭa; pronounced [ˈtˤɑntˤɑ]) is a city in Egypt. It had a population of 530,000 in 2024, making it the seventh most populous city in Egypt. The city is located between Cairo and Alexandria: 94 km (58 mi) north of Cairo and 130 km (81 mi) southeast of Alexandria. The capital of Gharbia Governorate, Tanta is a center for the cotton-ginning industry.

A key city in Egypt, Tanta is both a major commercial hub and a significant cultural center. One of the major railway lines in Egypt passes through Tanta, enhancing its connectivity and importance. It is also famed for its sweet shops and snack industry, particularly for its roasted chickpeas and confections like Hab El-Aziz. In addition to food production, the city is known for its oil, soap, flax, and textile industries. It hosts both Tanta University and a branch of Al-Azhar University, the only two universities in the governorate, offering diverse academic disciplines. The city also includes the historic Ahmadi Mosque, a long-standing center for Islamic scholarship.

Historically, Tanta dates back to the Late Period of ancient Egypt and has gone by several names over time, such as Tanitad, Tantathna, and Tantata. It witnessed massive urban expansion, especially during the reign of Isma'il Pasha and later between the 1950s and 1970s, absorbing farmland and neighboring villages like Qaffaha, Sejer, and Satouta, and connecting with villages such as Sibrbay, Mahalla Marhom, Meet Habeesh El-Bahareya, and Kafr Essam.

== Etymology ==
The current name of the city, Tanta, is a modified form of its ancient Coptic name Tanitad (Tantant). (Note: Peust 2010) Over time, the name underwent several transformations before reaching its present form. The geographer Ibn Hawqal (d. 380 AH; 990/991 CE) referred to it as "Tantata" in his book Ṣūrat al-ʾArḍ. Al-Idrisi (d. 560 AH; 1164/1165 CE) mentioned it as "Tantana" in his work Nuzhat al-Mushtāq fī Ikhtirāq al-Āfāq.

Al-As'ad ibn Mamati (d. 606 AH; 1209/1210 CE) recorded the name as "Tandata" in his book Qawānīn al-Dawāwīn. Ibn Jubayr (d. 614 AH; 1217/1218 CE) referred to it as "Tandata" in his travelogue Riḥlat Ibn Jubayr. Yaqut al-Hamawi (d. 626 AH; 1228/1229 CE) cited the name as "Tantathna", and Ibn Duqmaq (d. 709 AH; 1309/1310 CE) used the form "Tandata".

Tanta is also known as the "City of Shaykh al-Arab" and the "City of al-Badawi".

== History ==
Archaeological evidence indicates that the area of present‑day Tanta was inhabited as early as the reign of Egypt’s 26th Dynasty. A red granite block bearing the name of Pharaoh Ahmose II (570–526 BCE) was discovered near the Ahmad al‑Badawi Mosque, suggesting the settlement may have been known in antiquity as *Tanasu* or *Tanaso*. During the 4th century BCE, Greek sources referred to the town as “Tanitad,” and in the Roman period it was known as “Tantathna,” where it also maintained a local council of elders. The French Egyptologist Georges Daressy proposed that in the Greek period the settlement may have been called *Tawa*, *Tawwa*, or *Tafa* in Latin. In the Byzantine era, it appeared as *Tou* and was the seat of a significant bishopric.

During the Muslim conquest of Egypt, the settlement retained the name “Tanitad,” which later evolved into “Tantada.” It remained a small village until the 11th century CE, when it became the capital of the Tandtawi district under the Fatimid Caliph Al‑Mustansir Billah, who appointed a governor to administer it. Subsequently, the administrative structure changed, and Tantada became part of the larger Gharbia Governorate with its capital at Mahalla. Under the rule of Saladin, the village expanded to cover about 100 feddans.

Tanta regained prominence in the 13th century with the arrival of the Sufi figure Ahmad al‑Badawi, who settled there c. 634 – 637 AH (1236/1237 – 1239/1240 CE). His annual birthday festival transformed the town into a major commercial hub and attracted the attention and patronage of local rulers and leaders of the Badawiyyah Sufi order. The celebration is still held at the Ahmad al‑Badawi Mosque, the city’s most significant religious monument.

The city’s development continued under Ali Bey al‑Kabir, who initiated construction of the present Ahmad al‑Badawi Mosque, funded salaries for teachers and students, and established commercial infrastructure including shops and caravanserais. During this period, goods such as indian textiles and Yemeni coffee became common in local markets.

Following the French invasion of Egypt in 1798, a French battalion under General Le Fèvre reached Tanta on 7 October, at a time when pilgrims were gathered for the annual festival. Encouraged by the local governor, Salim al‑Shurbagi, worshippers resisted the French, briefly forcing their retreat. This popular uprising later became commemorated as the national day of Gharbia Governorate. The French returned three days later, besieged the town, shelled it, and captured it. They arrested the custodians of the Ahmad al‑Badawi shrine and imposed heavy fines on both the shrine and the population. During the occupation, the French administration reassigned Tanta to the Monufia Governorate.

Scholars of the French campaign estimated Tanta’s population at around 10,000 and noted the presence of 12 commercial agencies. The Ottoman traveler Evliya Çelebi later described the town as having 1,500 houses, eight large mosques, 32 smaller mosques, seven schools, and seven caravanserais, and also noted the tomb of Ahmad al‑Badawi.

In 1813, Muhammad Ali Pasha reorganized the Nile Delta, restoring Tanta to Gharbia province, which then comprised two‑thirds of the Delta’s land. Tanta became the capital of a district that included 12 villages. It officially replaced Mahalla as the capital of Gharbia Governorate in 1836 and, between 1856 and 1874, served at intervals as the capital of the province of Rawdat al‑Bahrayn, which encompassed much of the Delta except Damietta.

Tanta flourished during the 19th‑century cotton export boom, becoming a regional industrial and commercial center and attracting migrants from across Egypt and abroad, including Levantines, Jews, British, Italians, and French.

In 1888, Ali Mubarak Pasha described Tanta as an overcrowded city with narrow streets and poorly constructed buildings. Under Khedive Ismail, however, the town underwent significant urban development, including wider avenues, a municipal engineer, and a health director. By that period it extended over approximately 180 feddans. Several educational institutions were established, including the Saint Louis School, a convent school, an American missionary school, and Tanta Secondary School. The Alliance Israélite Universelle opened a school in 1905 that enrolled 220 students in its first year.

During the 1919 Revolution, Tanta experienced frequent disruptions to railway and telegraph lines. On 12 March, British forces fired on unarmed demonstrators, killing 16 and injuring 49. On 18 November, some 40,000 people marched in protest, prompting the authorities to require passports for entry into the city.

In 1921, following a decree by Sultan Hussein Kamel establishing a delegation led by Adly Yakan to negotiate with the British, local residents protested, demanding that Saad Zaghloul lead the talks. Demonstrations spread, leading to closures of shops, factories, and cafés, and telegrams were sent to the government expressing local demands.

Tanta was among the cities involved in the 1935 Egyptian protests, which sought restoration of the 1923 Constitution and an end to British occupation. Students from the Ahmadi Institute led protests beginning on 13 November, resulting in clashes with police; one demonstrator was killed and dozens were wounded. A large peaceful march followed on 18 November, and the city observed strikes and school closures until the constitution was reinstated. Further unrest in January 1936 led to the temporary closure of Tanta Secondary School and the Ahmadi Institute, with continued disturbances until the formation of the first government under Ali Mahir Pasha.

In 1960, the villages of Qaffaha and Kafr Sejer were annexed to the city as part of its urban expansion. Tanta also played a role in the Egyptian revolution of 2011, witnessing large demonstrations. In 2013, the city hosted both pro‑ and anti‑Mohamed Morsi protests, reflecting its continued political significance.

== Geography ==
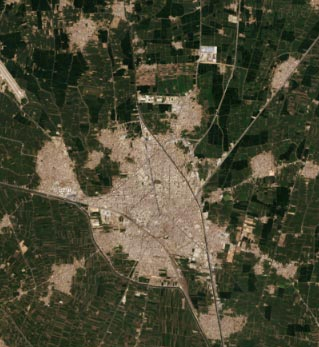
2021 satellite photo of Tanta

Tanta is located in the center of the Nile Delta in northern Egypt, in the southern part of the Gharbia Governorate. It occupies a central position relative to Cairo, Alexandria, and most other cities of the Delta. Like the rest of the Delta, the city’s soil is black, alluvial, and formed from Nile silt. This fertile and flat terrain facilitated the city’s urban expansion and its integration with surrounding villages. The city is bordered to the north and east by the Qasr Drain, and to the west and south by the Tanta Canal. In the past, various canals such as the Ja'fariyya Canal ran through what is now the urban area.

Tanta experienced a major wave of urban expansion between 1947 and 1976, marked by the spread of informal housing on its agricultural outskirts. This was driven by rural-to-urban migration, increased job opportunities, and the development of modern roads and transportation. Most of the growth occurred to the north and west, near the Cairo–Alexandria agricultural road, and extended southward, leading to the expansion of areas like Kafrat Satouta and Kafrat Al-Ajezi. These areas eventually connected with Kafr Sejer, prompting their incorporation into the city, along with Qaffaha, in 1960.

The southeastern expansion was limited due to poor services, proximity to cemeteries, and the presence of railway workshops, which hindered development. However, the area later attracted industrial activity because of cheap land prices, drawing both migrants from rural areas and residents displaced from the Suez Canal region after the 1967 war.

Between 1976 and 1986, the city expanded further to reach Sibrbay, where a campus for Tanta University, branches of Al-Azhar University, and a broadcasting center were established. It also extended toward Mahalla Marhom and Meet Habeesh El-Bahareya, separated from the city only by the Qasr Drain. This expansion was fueled by population growth, rising living standards, and the economic influence of Egyptian expatriates in the Gulf region. These surrounding villages continue to attract people for work or residence and serve as hubs for commercial and educational activities.

Tanta faces several urban challenges, including encroachment on fertile farmland, the deterioration of the old city center, lack of public services, and environmental pollution. These issues are compounded by the governorate’s lack of a desert hinterland, weak oversight of urban development, and poor coordination among local authorities.

=== Old Core ===
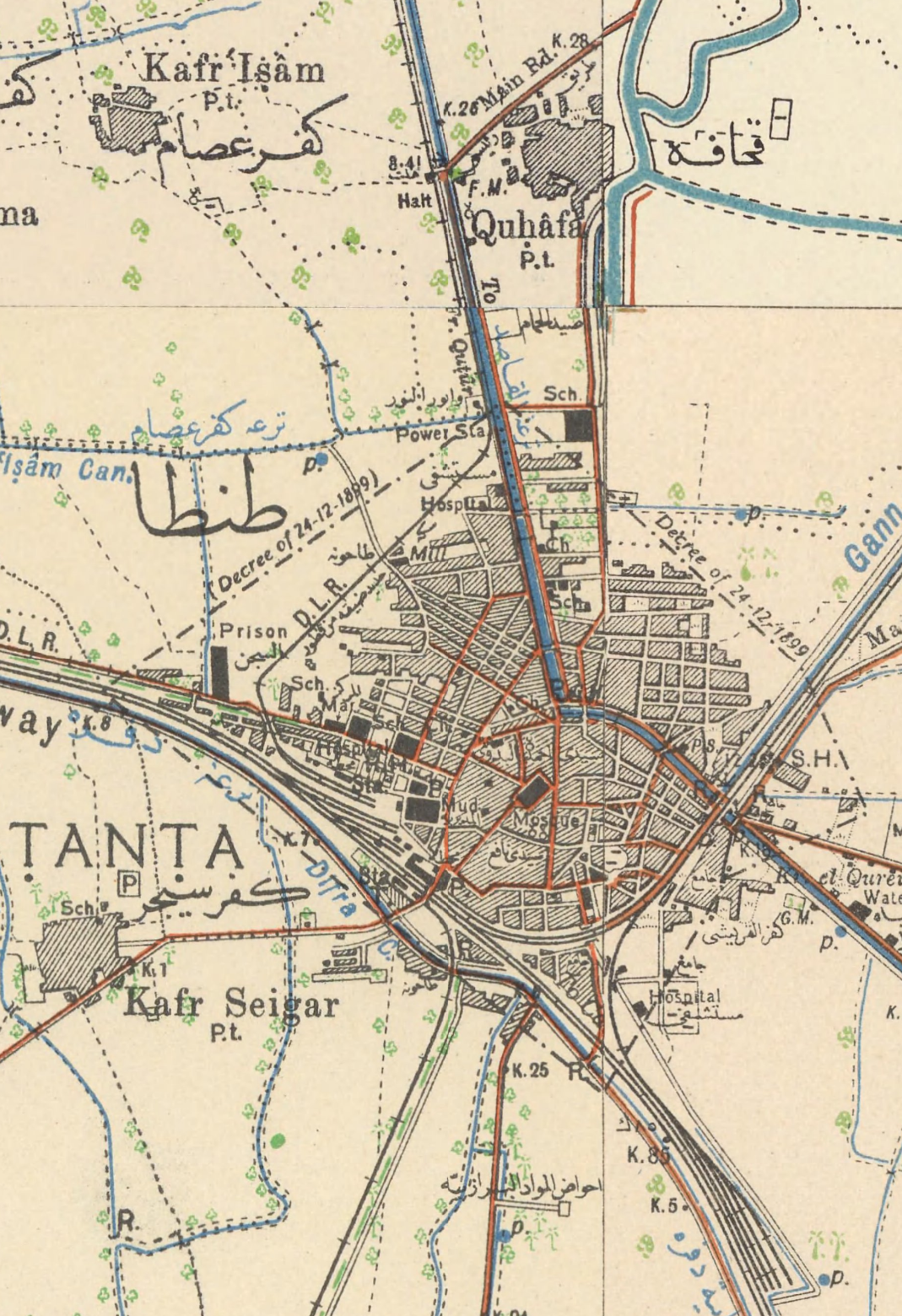
1901 map of Tanta

The heart of the city sits approximately three meters above the surrounding agricultural lands, as it was built atop ancient mounds. In the Middle Ages, the city was limited to the area around the Ahmadi Mosque, surrounded by canals to the east and south and enclosed by high walls. During the reign of Isma'il Pasha, Tanta expanded beyond these walls, with a new district established to the west of the old core. This district housed the headquarters of Gharbia Governorate, several government buildings, palaces, and four foreign consulates (Italian, French, Persian, and Greek). Cotton ginneries and storage facilities were later built to the north of the old city center.

Today, the population of this old core is declining due to higher commercial land values, prompting residents to move toward the city’s outskirts. Urban sprawl extended eastward in an unplanned manner to areas like Al-Kafra Al-Sharqiya and Kafr El-Qurashi, and northward to areas such as Kafr El-Kurdi (also known as Kafr Ali Agha El-Kurdi), Kafr Taher, and Kafr Gharib. West of the old city, Kafrat al-Bahariya emerged, while to the south, neighborhoods like Kafrat Sheikh Salim and Kafrat Ibrahim El-Masry appeared near the site of present-day Kafr Satouta.

=== Area Expansion ===
Estimates of the city’s size vary depending on the source. The Central Agency for Public Mobilization and Statistics (CAPMAS) reported that Tanta covered 909 feddans in 1937, growing to 1,515 feddans by 1970, and reaching 8.81 km² in 1976. In 2007, the city’s area was estimated at approximately 3,604 feddans, including about 1,258.57 feddans for residential use, 547.31 feddans for public services, and 181.52 feddans for economic activities.

By 2006, the area was estimated at 19.04 km², and by 2013, it had grown to 23.26 km². In 2019, Tanta's area was measured at 20.2 km², representing 6.1% of the total area of the Tanta district. Of this, residential zones made up 30.8%, agricultural land 23.6%, educational use 3.5%, and health services 0.7%.

== Divisions ==
The 27 shiakhas of Tanta (Arabic)

The two districts of Tanta

Tanta is divided into 27 shiakhas (neighborhood units), with 10 located in the First District and 17 in the Second District. Additionally, there are 6 shiakhas under the jurisdiction of the Third Police Division. Historically, the city was divided into 15 shiakhas—seven in the First District (including Al-Borsa, Al-Dawawin, Sejer, Al-Muhatta, Marzouk, Al-Saa'a, and Wabor El-Nour) and eight in the Second District (including Al-Salkhana, Al-Omari, Al-Kafra Al-Sharqiya, Al-Malga, Sabry, Ali Agha, Qaffaha, and Khareg Al-Kordon).

== Demographics ==
=== Population ===
Tanta is a densely populated city; it is the third-largest city in the Nile Delta and the ninth-largest in Egypt. As of January 2025, its population was estimated at 604,653. This large population is primarily due to two main factors: natural population growth and rural-to-urban migration, as Tanta is one of the main destinations for migrants within the Delta.

Due to this population increase, Tanta’s urban sprawl has merged with the nearby villages and hamlets of Qaffaha, Kafr Essam, Sibrbay, Kafr Sejer, Kafr Satouta, and El-Agaizi.

The city’s population growth rate between 1996 and 2006 was 1.2653 (approximately 1.29% annually). The average household size was 3.7, and the infant mortality rate stood at 19.81 per 1,000 live births in 2006. The significant population increase in Tanta is mainly attributed to migration, which accounted for 89.1% of the city's population growth between 1986 and 1996, and 93.1% between 1996 and 2006.

To help accommodate this demographic expansion, the government has developed several public housing projects in areas such as Al-Salam, Shawqi Housing, Al-Tabari, Corniche Street (Tanta), New Qaffaha, Al-Sarie Housing, Al-Omari, Rat’at Al-Dafraweya, Al-Janabeya, New Stables, and the Youth City.

=== Religion ===
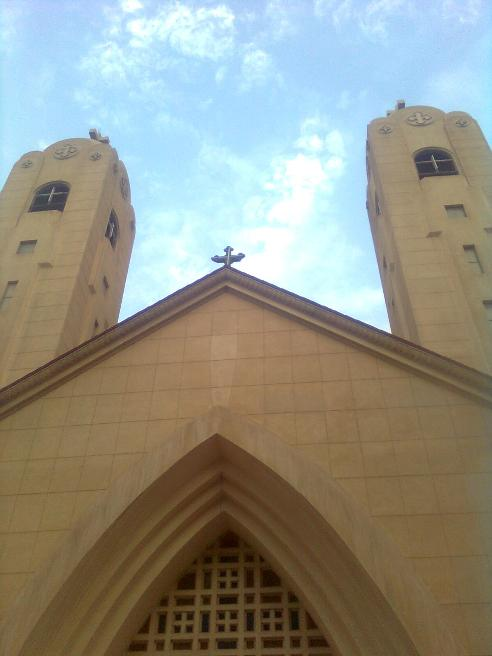
St George’s Church

The majority of Tanta’s population are Sunni Muslims, with a Christian minority—primarily Coptic Orthodox Christians—similar to most other Egyptian cities. The city is home to the headquarters of the Ahmadiyya Sufi order, located at the Ahmadi Mosque.

According to the 1986 census, the number of Muslims in the city was 311,516, while Christians numbered 24,982, out of a total population of 336,517 at the time. The Coptic Orthodox Church in Tanta is headed by Anba Boula, the Metropolitan of Tanta and its surrounding areas.

In the past, the city was home to a small Jewish community, which numbered 943 people in the 1926 census. This community had a lodge called Ohel Moshe, and three synagogues: the Magrabi Synagogue (the oldest), one established by Bekhor Mouton in 1908, and another built by Luna Bouton in 1924.

== Economy ==
The city's central location has contributed to the growth of industrial settlement within it. As the capital of the Gharbia Governorate, it has become a hub for industries and services that cater to other cities in the region. Its position amid agricultural lands has also made it a center for the trade of agricultural products. In 2019, the city's labor force reached 143,060—a 24.2% increase from 115,226 in 1996.

The largest segment of the population works in the services sector, which employed 85,316 people in 2019, representing 59.6% of the workforce. Although the number of service workers rose compared to 2017, their percentage of the total workforce slightly declined from 59.9%.

=== Industry ===
Historically, sources mention that Tanta’s traditional industry was the production of karaka linen, which was exported to Syria. Today, the city hosts an industrial zone along Galaa Street, which includes the Delta Spinning and Weaving Company, Misr Dairy Company, and the Tanta Oil and Soap Company. In addition, there are many private sector factories engaged in a variety of light industries, such as fertilizers, sweets, agricultural pesticides, and food products, as well as rice mills and cotton ginneries.

=== Tourism ===
The birthday celebration festival of al-Badawi is considered one of the most famous religious festivals in Egypt, with its prominence dating back to the Mamluk era. It is said that around 150,000 people visited during the French campaign, and that number rose to 100,000 in the early 19th century. By the 1860s, after Tanta was connected by rail, attendance reached nearly one million. Today, it is estimated that between one and three million people attend the festival.

The celebration lasts for one week each October under tight security and draws thousands of Sufi followers from all across Egypt. It is also an important commercial season, attracting vendors who sell sugarcane, rice pudding, koshary, flags, and other goods to visitors. During this time, sweet shops, cafés, and restaurants experience a significant economic boom.

The city's most prominent Christian landmark is the St. George Coptic Orthodox Church, which was established by a royal decree from King Fuad I in 1934 and completed in 1939. It is the largest church in Tanta. The church was the target of a terrorist attack during the Palm Sunday church bombings in which 27 people were killed and 176 injured.

== Culture ==
Tanta is home to two prominent libraries. The first is the Ahmadi Library, which is attached to the Ahmadi Mosque. It was established in 1898 during the reign of Khedive Abbas Helmy II and was initially based on the book collections of the mosque’s teachers. By 1955, the library housed 10,200 books and 11,700 volumes, including 1,500 manuscripts.

The second is the Dar Al-Kutub (House of Books), founded in 1913 and later relocated to its current site on Geesh Street in 1960. This library holds a collection of 292 manuscripts.

=== Tanta Museum ===
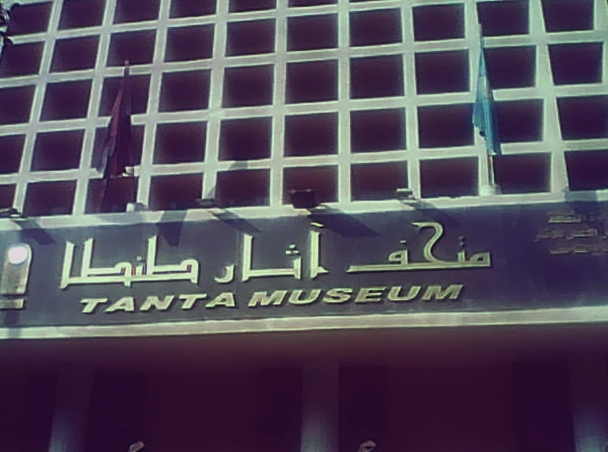
Tanta Museum

Tanta Museum was first established in 1913 in a room within the Tanta City Council to display a small collection of antiquities. In 1957, it was relocated to the entrance of the Municipal Cinema. The current building was constructed by the Supreme Council of Antiquities in 1981 and officially opened in 1990.

The museum consists of five floors:

The first floor is dedicated to Islamic antiquities. The second holds manuscripts. The third contains antiquities from the Greco-Roman and Coptic periods. The fourth showcases ancient Egyptian artifacts. The fifth houses administrative offices, a storage room, and a conference hall. The museum is located at the beginning of Mohib Street, off Bahr Street. It contains artifacts from local excavations as well as items from other governorates and museums. The museum was closed in 2000 due to various issues but reopened in 2019 with a collection of 2,000 artifacts.

=== Tanta Cultural Center ===
Tanta Theater was inaugurated in 1936 by then-Prime Minister Mostafa El-Nahas under the name "Tanta Municipality Theater." Built in the Italian style, it served as a central venue for cultural dissemination in the governorate. The theater was renovated over eight years starting in 2010 by the National Service Projects Organization, at a cost of 50 million EGP. After the renovation, it was reopened as the Tanta Cultural Center by Culture Minister Inas Abdel Dayem and Gharbia Governor Ahmed Sakr.

Located in Republic Square, the theater spans 1,500 square meters and seats 450 people. It includes halls for information technology, VIP lounges, artist dressing rooms, rehearsal spaces, and rooms for cultural and artistic activities. The stage measures 12 meters in length, 20 meters in width, and 20 meters in height.

== Infrastructure ==
=== Education ===
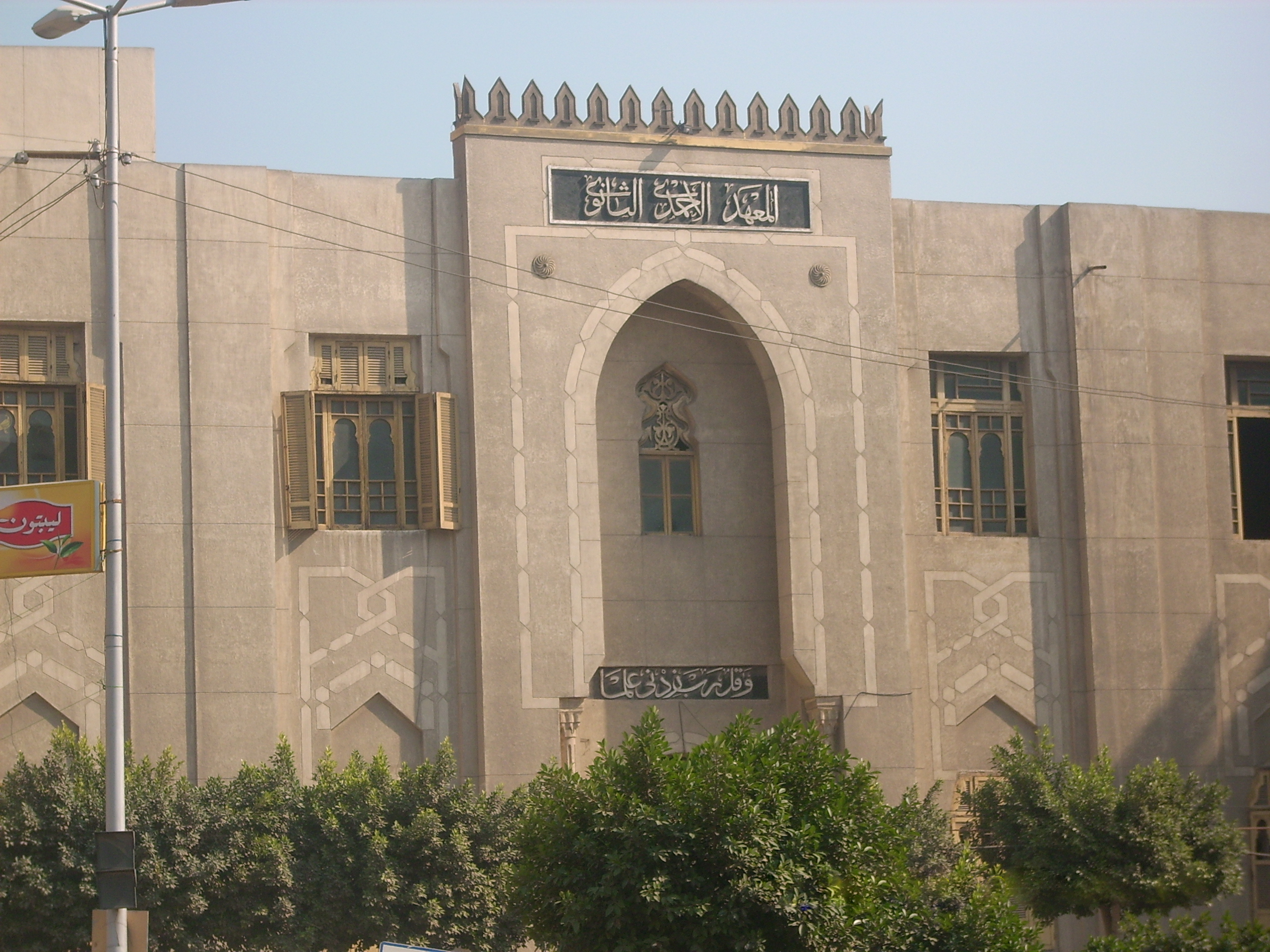
Al-Ahmadi Azhar Institute

The enrollment rate for students across all educational levels in Tanta reached 92.6%, and the literacy rate stood at 83.3% in 2005. According to the 2017 census, the number of illiterate individuals in the city was 47,500, while 28,408 held a high school diploma and 117,385 held a university degree. Tanta has a diverse range of private and public schools, Al-Azhar institutes, and technical schools, totaling 254 schools with 3,284 classrooms.

==== Universities ====
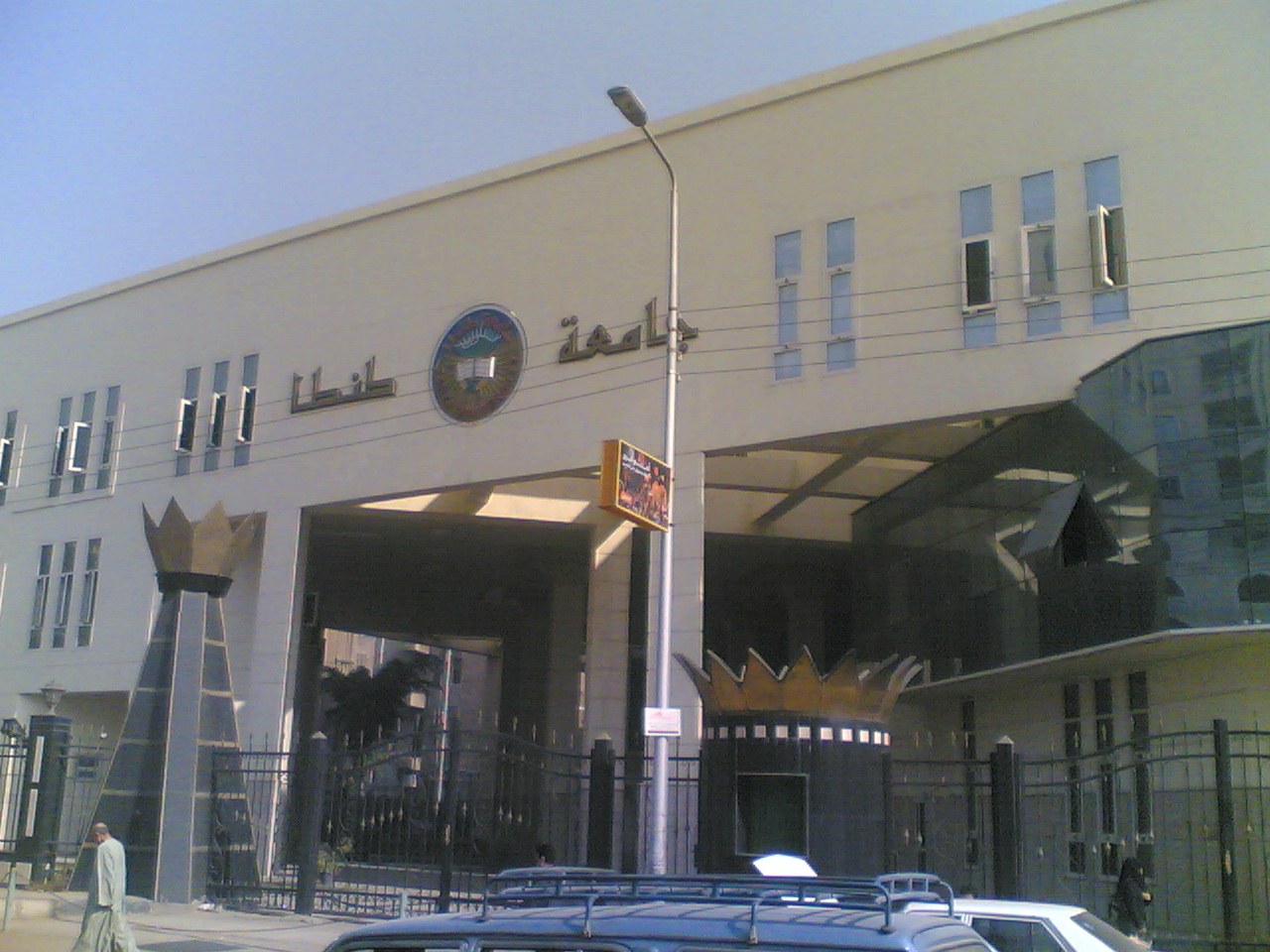
Tanta University

Tanta University is one of the prominent universities in the Nile Delta region, offering a wide range of academic disciplines. It began as a branch of Alexandria University in 1962 before becoming an independent institution under the name "Middle Delta University" in 1972. Its name was changed to Tanta University in 1973. The university currently includes 16 faculties: Medicine, Science, Education, Commerce, Pharmacy, Dentistry, Arts, Law, Nursing, Engineering, Agriculture, Physical Education, Specific Education, Computer and Information Sciences, Applied Arts, and a Technical Nursing Institute. As of 2020, the university is headed by Dr. Mahmoud Ahmed Zaki Mohamed.

Tanta also hosts a campus of Al-Azhar University that includes three colleges: the Faculty of Fundamentals of Religion and Islamic Preaching (established in 1976), the Faculty of Sharia and Law (established in 1978), and the Faculty of the Quranic Sciences and Readings (established on September 30, 1991).

=== Health ===
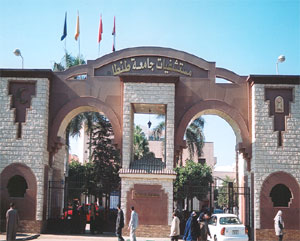
Tanta University Hospital

Among the public hospitals in Tanta are:

- Tanta General Hospital
- 57357 Hospital
- El-Menshawy General Hospital
- Tanta University Hospital
- El-Mabara Health Insurance Hospital
- Tanta Chest Hospital
- Tanta Fever Hospital
- Tanta Military Hospital
- Tanta Ophthalmology Hospital

=== Sports ===
Tanta Sporting Club was founded in 1932, making it the oldest sports club in the city. It currently plays in the Egyptian Second Division and has previously competed in the Egyptian Premier League for several seasons.

=== Drinking Water ===
Tanta’s water network is among the oldest in Egypt, established in 1907. However, it has not kept pace with the city’s urban expansion and growing population. The primary source of the city’s water supply is groundwater, drawn from 12 groundwater stations. The secondary source is water from the Qasr Canal, which is treated at the Galaa Water Station on Galaa Street, the New Tanta Station in the southeast of the city, and the Filter Station in the First District.

== Landmarks ==
=== Ahmad al-Badawi Mosque ===
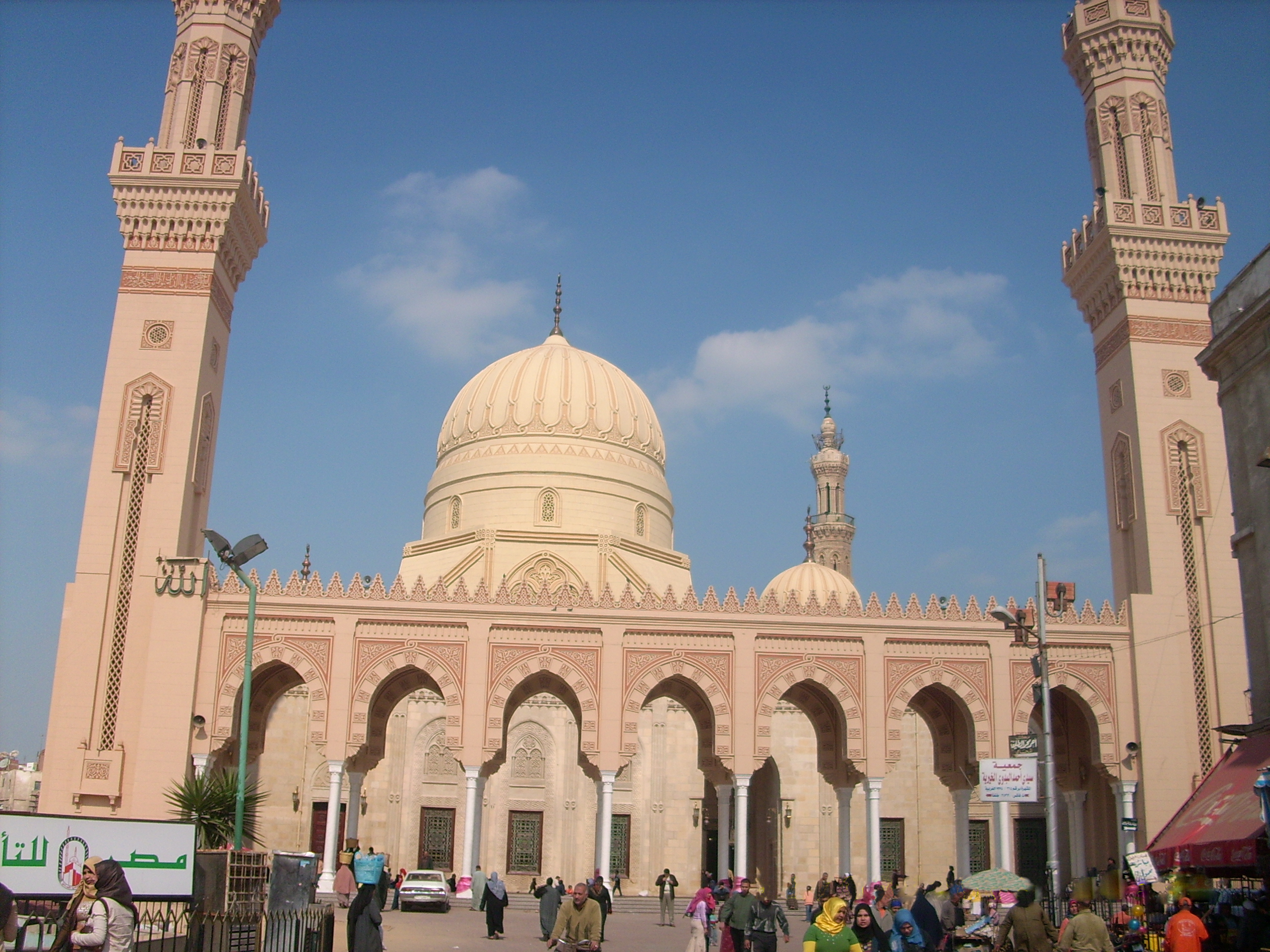
El-Sayed el-Badawy Mosque

The Ahmad al-Badawi Mosque is the most famous mosque in Tanta and all of Gharbia Governorate, and among the most renowned in the Nile Delta. It covers an area of one and a half feddans. The mosque is square-shaped, featuring a domed courtyard surrounded by four arcades. The tombs of Ahmad al-Badawi, his disciple Abdul-Mutal, and Sheikh Mujahid are located on the southern side. The mosque has seven entrances—four on the western side and one on each of the remaining sides.

The mosque was originally a small zawiya (Sufi lodge) for the Ahmadiyya order in the 13th century CE. Later, the Mamluk Sultan Qaitbay built a minaret and a dome over it. The current mosque was built by Ali Bey al-Kabir in the 18th century, along with a sabil (public water fountain) and a school for orphans. He also installed a copper enclosure around the tomb and endowed the mosque with agricultural land and real estate to support scholars, the poor, students, and followers of the Ahmadiyya order.

The mosque became a center of Islamic studies in the 18th century, similar to Al-Azhar, with over 2,000 students and a sheikh equivalent to the Sheikh of Al-Azhar. It reached the peak of its prestige in the 19th century. The mosque was renovated and expanded during the reigns of Abbas I of Egypt, Muhammad Sa'id, Isma'il Pasha, Abbas Helmy II, and King Fuad I, with the latest renovation completed in 2024. The annual celebration of Al-Badawi is celebrated at the mosque, accompanied by fairs, dhikr gatherings, and tents set up for visitors in the Sejer area south of the city.

=== Other Mosques ===
Tanta has many mosques and shrines. The oldest is the Al-Borsa Mosque, said to have been established by a companion of the Prophet during the Rashidun Caliphate. It is now known as the Muhammad Al-Bahi Mosque, where he is buried. The second-oldest is the Marzouk Al-Ghazi Mosque, built at the end of the Umayyad period and known as the Umayyad Mosque until Marzouk Al-Ghazi settled there and was buried during the Mamluk era. The current structure was built in 1578 CE and renovated in 1927 CE. Another well-known mosque is the Izz Al-Rijal Mosque, named after the Sufi figure Muhammad Izz Al-Din. Built in the iwan style but without a courtyard, it was restored in 1894 CE.

==== Sabils ====
Ali Bey al-Kabir, the Mamluk ruler of Egypt, built a sabil near the Ahmad al-Badawi Mosque in 1770 during the Ottoman era. It was later relocated in 1962 to its current site on Galaa Street. The sabil is constructed in Islamic architectural style, featuring traditional carvings and decorations, as well as ornate windows and doors. The area around it was renovated in 2011. Another newer sabil, the Ahmadi Sabil, is located on the mosque’s southwestern side.

=== Palaces ===
The Princess Feryal Palace was built in 1909 by Ibrahim Bahgat in the Khedivial area of Tanta. It features a unique baroque architectural style unlike other buildings in the city. It was initially a private residence, then served as a school for 70 years before being abandoned. The Ministry of Public Education rented it from its owner and turned it into a school named after Princess Feryal, daughter of King Farouk I. It was later renamed Al-Zuhour School, after the palace's large flower-filled garden.

Another palace is the Cohen Palace (also known as the Villa of Mohamed Bey Asaad), located on Tutankhamun Street off Bahr Street. It was built by the Jewish Cohen family in the early 20th century. The family later raffled the palace via lottery, which was won by Mohamed Bey Asaad, the current owner.

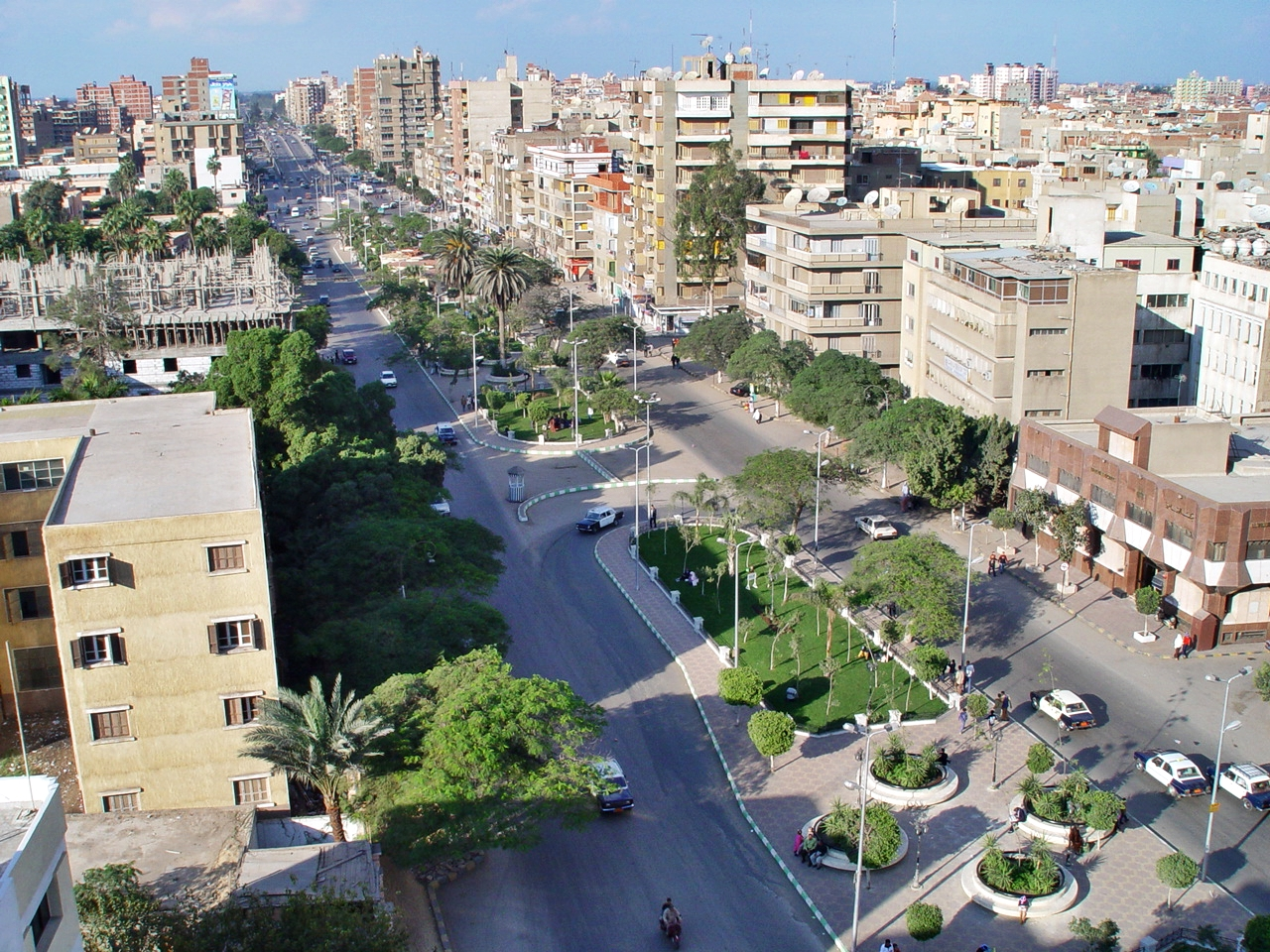
Tanta's city center, Elgeish street.

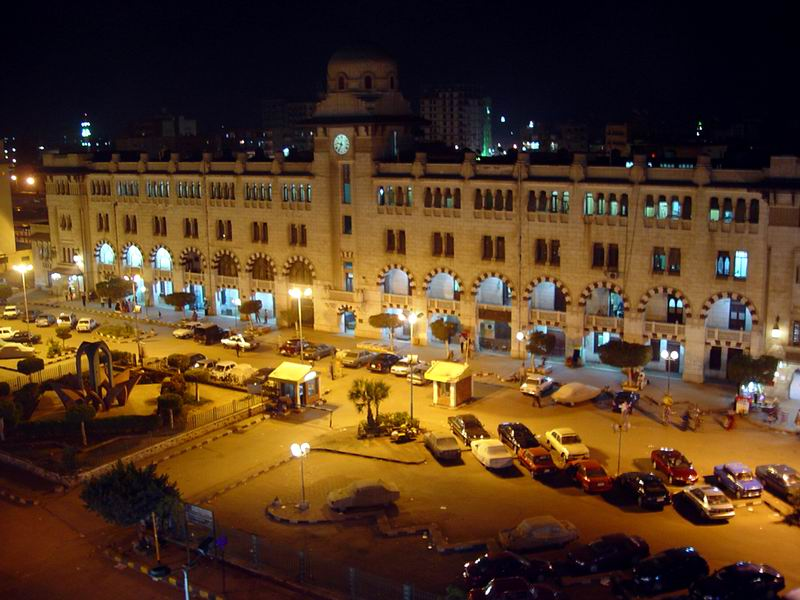
Tanta Station at Night

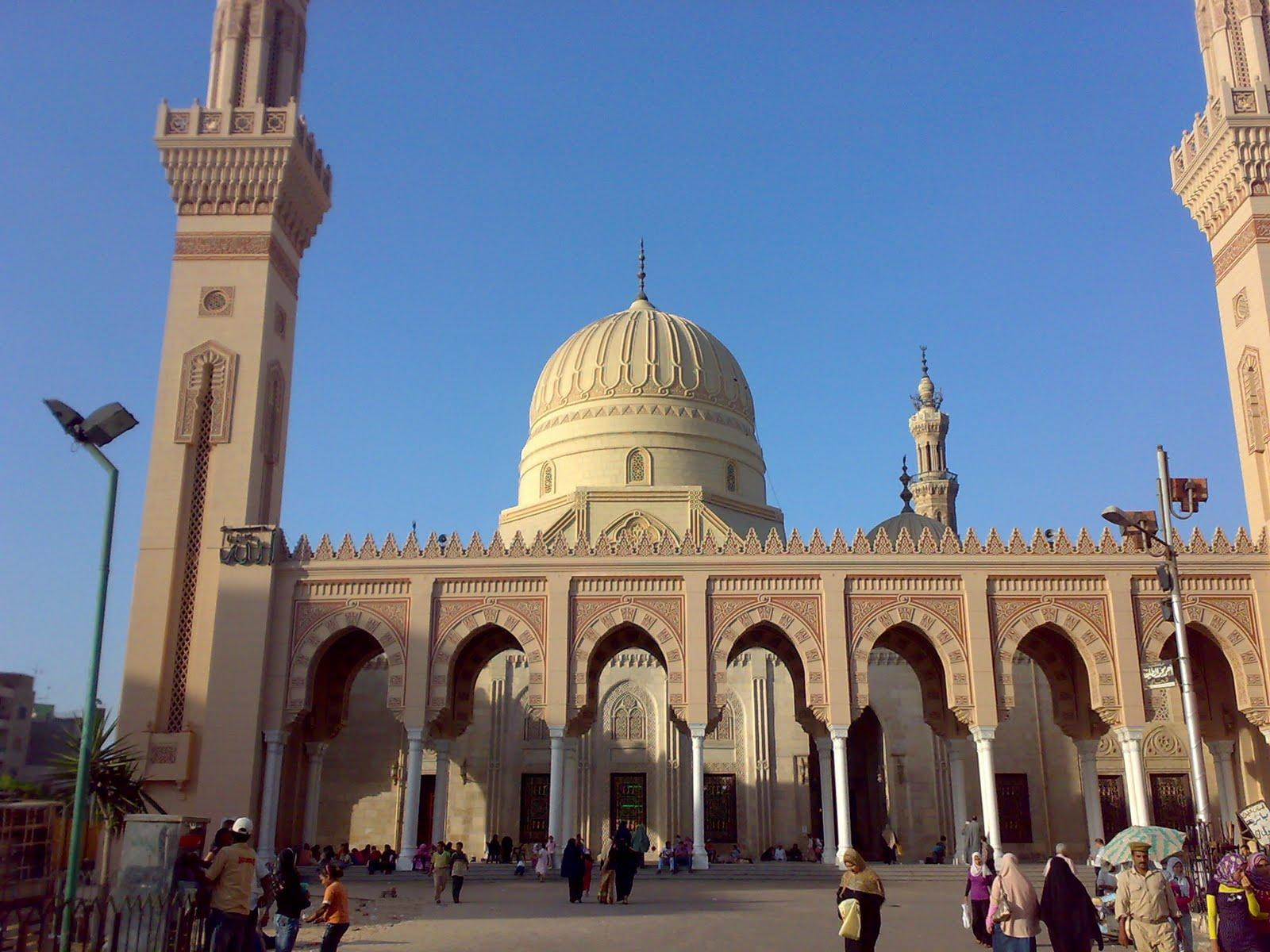
Ahmad al-Badawi Mosque

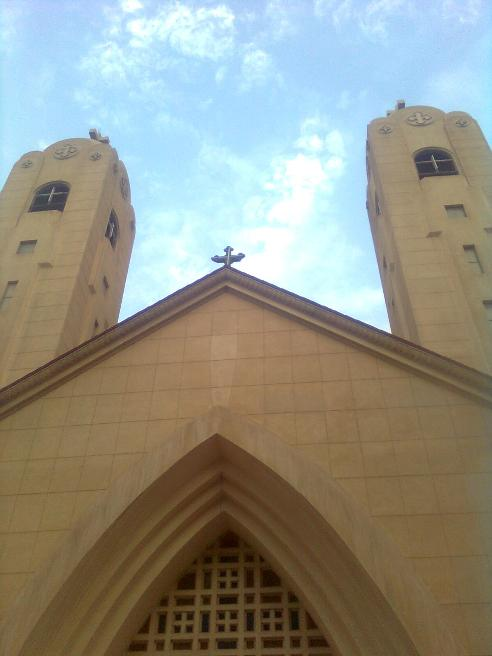
Saint George Cathedral

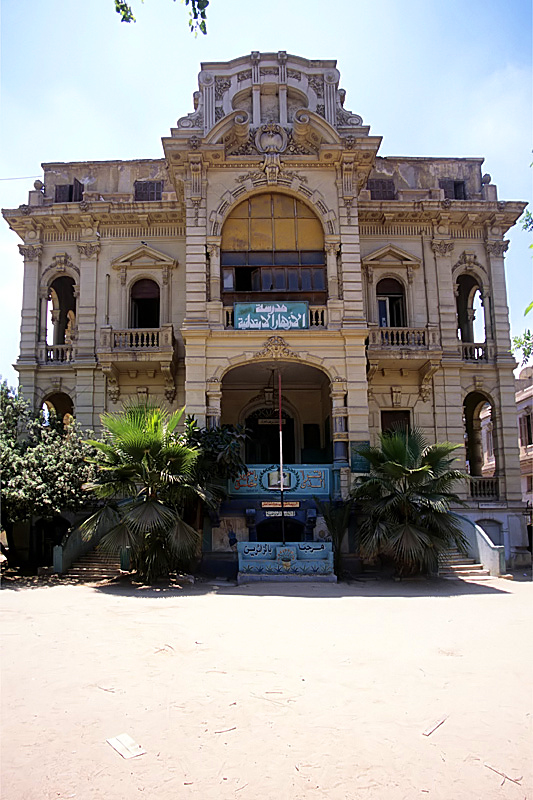
palace in Tanta which was used as a primary school named flowers school

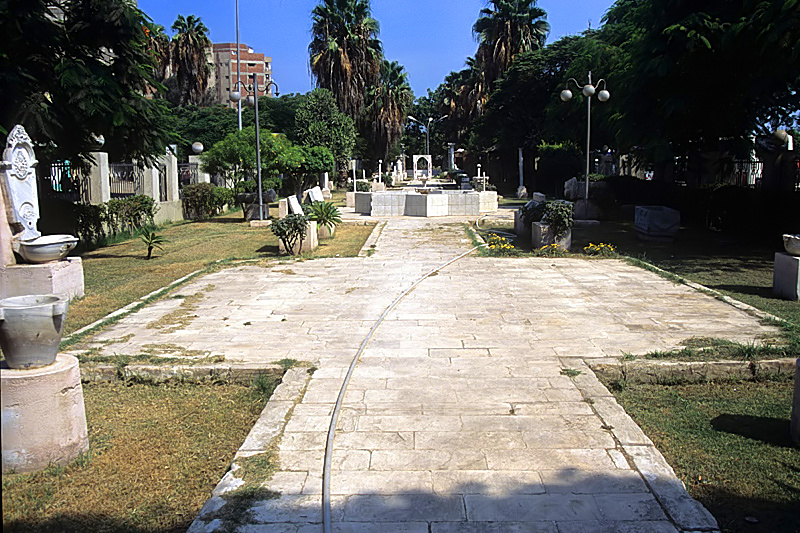
Tanta Montaza park

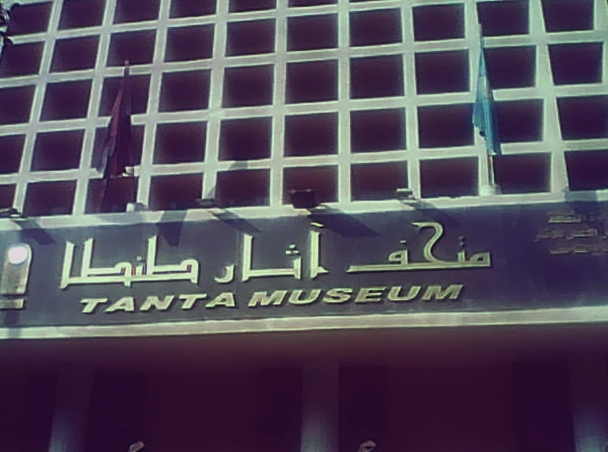
Tanta Museum

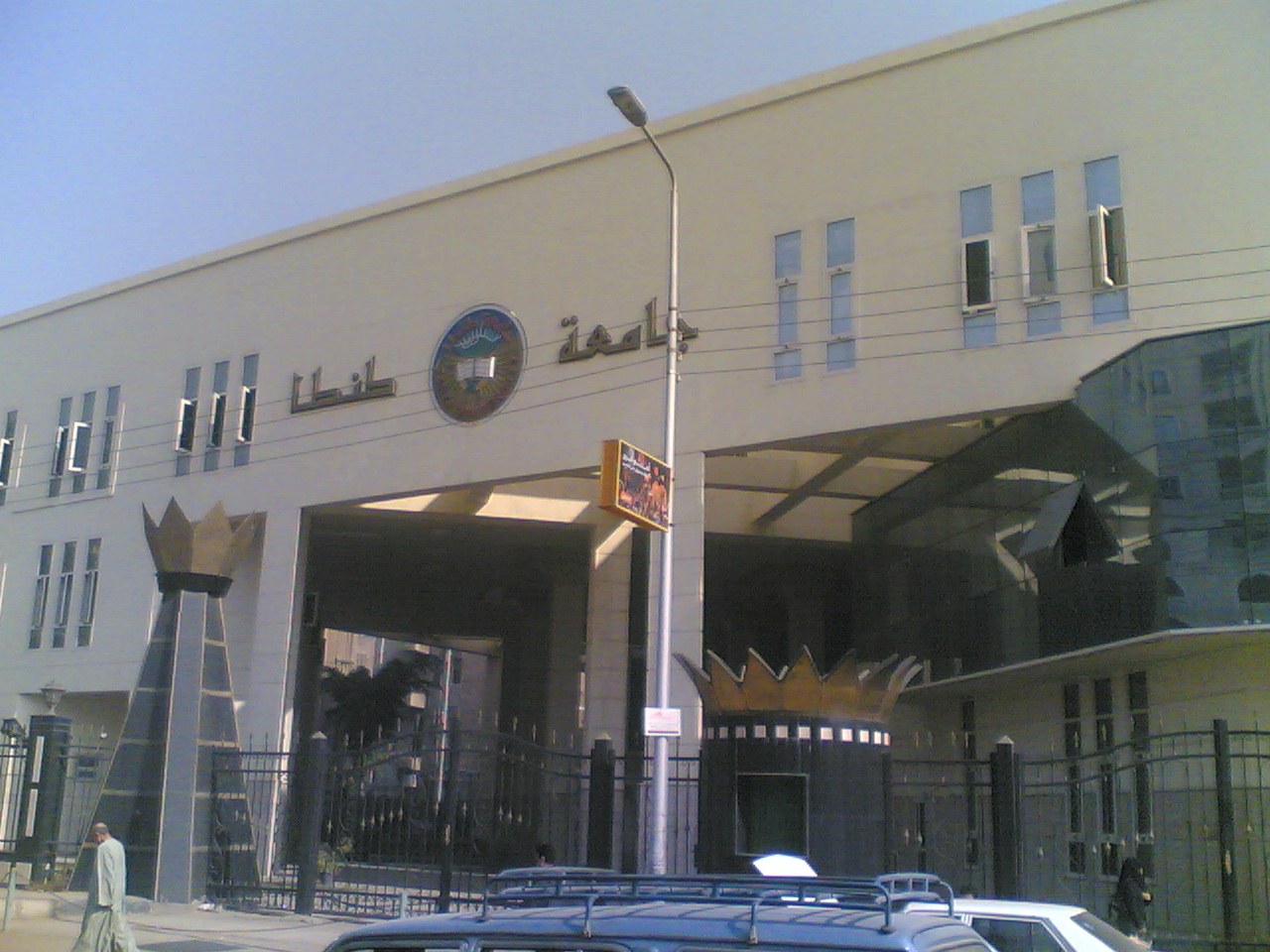
Tanta University

== Transportation ==
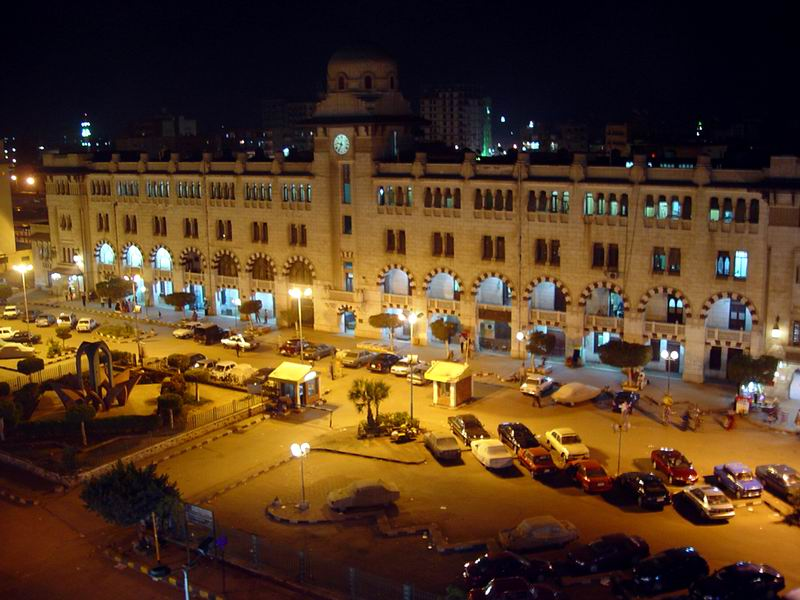
Tanta Railway Station

As of 2019, Tanta had a road network spanning 508.8 kilometers, with 27 main streets such as Elmodiriyya, El-Geish Street, Elnahhas, Taha El-Hakim, Al-Borsa, Ahmed Maher, Alexandria, Saeed Street, El-Helou Street, and Mohib Street. These roads are vital due to the buildings they contain or their connections to major squares like Republic, Al-Hekma, Al-Saa'a, and Alexandria. The city has six tunnels under railway lines: Segar (Satouta), Al-Khadem, El-Maqaber, El-Orashi, El-Ganabiyya, and El-Agaizi (market).

Traffic congestion is common, especially in the mornings and afternoons. Problems include pedestrian and vehicle traffic mixing, bottlenecks near tunnels, the growing number of cars exceeding the capacity of the city’s roads, and ineffective traffic management.

Public transportation includes buses operated by the Gharbia Governorate, cooperative buses, microbuses, and taxis. These systems are often overcrowded due to the city’s population density, narrow streets, and poor road conditions. In 2026 Egypts transport minister Kamel el Wazeer announced plans to build an underground metro system in Tanta. Rail lines divide the city, causing disconnection and congestion.

Tanta is a central transportation hub for the Nile Delta and a strategic crossroads for Egypt as a whole. It is served by the Cairo–Alexandria agricultural road and another route connecting it to the Port of Damietta via Mahalla, Samannoud, and Mansoura. Other roads link Tanta to Shibin El Kom and other towns in the governorate.

The city is also home to Tanta railway station, the largest in the Delta and the second oldest in Egypt after Misr Station in Cairo. Opened in 1856 on the Cairo–Alexandria railway, it serves 203 trains. Major lines passing through include the Cairo–Alexandria line (via Berket El Sab), the Tanta–Mansoura–Damietta line, the Tanta–Zagazig line, the Tanta–Menouf–Qalyub line, and the Tanta–Kafr El Sheikh line (via Qutour).

Until the late 19th century, the Qasr Canal was a major transportation route. In the 18th century, it reportedly held about 10,000 boats during the birthday celebration of al-Badawi. Its significance declined with the arrival of railways in the 1850s, and its original course (now El-Galaa Street and El-Bahr street was filled in. The canal now runs through northern Tanta, measuring 6.3 km in length and 34 meters in width. The Tanta Navigation Canal lies south of the city, extending 4.9 km in length and 29 meters in width, connecting Tanta to Shibin El Kom and Kafr El Zayat.

== Climate ==
Tanta has a warm winter and hot summer climate, and is relatively moderate throughout the year. The most significant weather phenomena affecting the city are winter and spring low-pressure systems, which are the main cause of rainfall and the occurrence of the Khamsin winds.

The average annual precipitation in the city is 4.39 mm. The average annual relative humidity was recorded at 66.0% in 2023.

The lowest temperature ever recorded in the city was −2°C (28°F), on January 4, 1937, and again on February 9, 1950. The highest recorded temperature was 46.8°C (116.2°F), on May 10, 1942, when the temperature rose by 15°C (27°F) within hours due to a passing low-pressure system over the city.

For most of the year, the weather in Tanta is calm. When winds do occur, they are usually from the north or west.

Climate data for Tanta 1991–2020 normals, extremes 1950–present
Month	Jan	Feb	Mar	Apr	May	Jun	Jul	Aug	Sep	Oct	Nov	Dec	Year
Record high °C (°F)	29.2 (84.6)	32.5 (90.5)	38.6 (101.5)	41.6 (106.9)	45.3 (113.5)	46.7 (116.1)	45.0 (113.0)	44.4 (111.9)	43.1 (109.6)	40.2 (104.4)	36.5 (97.7)	29.6 (85.3)	46.7 (116.1)
Mean daily maximum °C (°F)	18.9 (66.0)	20.3 (68.5)	23.3 (73.9)	28.3 (82.9)	32.4 (90.3)	35.1 (95.2)	35.8 (96.4)	35.6 (96.1)	33.9 (93.0)	30.7 (87.3)	25.5 (77.9)	20.7 (69.3)	28.4 (83.1)
Daily mean °C (°F)	13.4 (56.1)	14.3 (57.7)	16.9 (62.4)	21.0 (69.8)	24.9 (76.8)	27.8 (82.0)	29.2 (84.6)	29.1 (84.4)	27.4 (81.3)	24.4 (75.9)	19.6 (67.3)	15.1 (59.2)	22.0 (71.6)
Mean daily minimum °C (°F)	7.9 (46.2)	8.3 (46.9)	10.5 (50.9)	13.7 (56.7)	17.5 (63.5)	20.5 (68.9)	22.6 (72.7)	22.7 (72.9)	20.9 (69.6)	18.2 (64.8)	13.7 (56.7)	9.5 (49.1)	15.5 (59.9)
Record low °C (°F)	0.2 (32.4)	0.4 (32.7)	0.8 (33.4)	4.6 (40.3)	8.3 (46.9)	12.0 (53.6)	14.8 (58.6)	16.4 (61.5)	13.7 (56.7)	9.1 (48.4)	5.0 (41.0)	1.6 (34.9)	0.2 (32.4)
Average precipitation mm (inches)	12.3 (0.48)	8.4 (0.33)	6.2 (0.24)	2.8 (0.11)	1.1 (0.04)	0 (0)	0 (0)	0 (0)	0.1 (0.00)	3.6 (0.14)	7.2 (0.28)	11.5 (0.45)	53.2 (2.07)
Average precipitation days (≥ 1.0 mm)	3.1	2.5	2.0	0.8	0.4	0.0	0.0	0.0	0.1	0.9	1.8	2.8	14.4
Average relative humidity (%)	69.5	65	61.5	54	50	53	59.5	62	61.5	63	67.5	70	60.6
Average dew point °C (°F)	7.8 (46.0)	7.7 (45.9)	9.3 (48.7)	11.3 (52.3)	13.8 (56.8)	17.4 (63.3)	20.3 (68.5)	20.9 (69.6)	19.3 (66.7)	16.9 (62.4)	13.2 (55.8)	9.6 (49.3)	14.0 (57.2)
Mean monthly sunshine hours	207.7	220.4	260.4	282.0	319.3	348.0	356.5	347.2	300.0	275.9	222.0	195.3	3,334.7
Source 1: NOAA
Source 2: Egyptian Meteorological Authority / World Meteorological Organization; Climate Data

== Notable people ==
- Adel Esmat, Novelist
- Magda al-Sabahi or Magda Sabbahi = Magda (1931–2020), actress
- Huda Sultan (1925–2006) singer and actress
- Kamal Amin (1923–1979), artist
- Mahmoud Zulfikar (1914–1970), Film director
- Khairy Beshara, film director
- Abdu al-Hamuli (Egyptian Arabic: عبده الحامولى) (1836–1901), singer
- Mahmoud Khalil Al-Hussary, (1917–1980) reciter of the Qur'an
- Mohamed Fawzi (1918–1966), composer, singer, and actor
- Naima Akef (1929–1966), actress and circus player
- Doria Shafik (1908–1975), leader of the Women's Liberation Movement in the early 1950s
- Ahmad Hegazi (cartoonist) (1936–2011), known as "Hegazi", a caricature artist
- Nasr Abu Zayd (1943–2010), thinker and liberal theologian
- Ahmed Khaled Tawfik (1962–2018), author
- Amina Rizk (1910–2003), actress
- El-Sayed Nosseir (1905–1977), Olympic Gold medal winner in weightlifting
- Hilana Sedarous (1904-1998), first female Egyptian doctor and first female Egyptian gynaecologist
- Maximos V Hakim (1908-2001), Melkite Greek Catholic Patriarch
- Nabil Farouk (1956-2020), novelist

== See also ==
- List of cities and towns in Egypt
- Nile Delta
- Egyptian festivals
