= Al-Fida Club Saida =

- Leagues: Lebanese Basketball League Div.2
- Arena: Hariri Sport Club Court
- Location: Saida, Lebanon
- Team colors: Red and White
- President: Nizar Al-Rawas
Home	Away

Al-Fida Saida Sports Club, also known as Al-Fida Club (Arabic: نادي الفداء الرياضي) is a Lebanese basketball club based in Sidon, in Lebanon-Div.2 League. Where both old and young players can play in the team.

== Notable former players ==
- Hussein Tawbe
- Abdallah Hijazi
