= Ibdaa (magazine) =

Egyptian monthly literary magazine

- Categories: Literary magazine
- Frequency: Monthly
- Publisher: General Egyptian Book Organization
- First issue: 1 January 1983; 42 years ago
- Country: Egypt
- Based in: Cairo
- Language: Arabic

Ibdaa (Arabic: Creativity) is a monthly Arabic literary magazine based in Cairo, Egypt. It has been in circulation since 1983.

== History ==
Ibdaa was launched in January 1983. The magazine, based in Cairo, is published by the General Egyptian Book Organization, an agency of the ministry of culture.

Egyptian poet Ahmed Abdel Muti Hijazi became chief editor of the magazine in 1990 which he held until 2002 when he resigned from the post. He was reappointed chief editor of Ibdaa in 2006. As of 2015 the editor of Ibdaa was Egyptian novelist Mohamed Mansi Qandil.

One of the major contributors was Ahmed Morsi, an Egyptian painter and poet. His column was Risalat New York (Arabic: Dispatch from New York) which included his writings about Allen Ginsberg, Jasper Johns, and Toni Morrison.

== Bans ==
Ibdaa has been banned several times. For instance, it was banned following the publication of a painting portraying Adam and Eve naked. The other ban occurred after publishing a study about Jewish culture.

In April 2007, the magazine was banned and its license was revoked by the Egyptian State Council Administrative Court on 7 April 2009 due to the publication of a poem entitled "On the balcony of Leila Murad" by Egyptian poet Hilmi Salem (1951–2012). The poem in which God was likened to an Egyptian peasant was regarded by the court as "blasphemous". The petition to the court was made by the authorities at Al Azhar University. However, the earlier prints of the poem in Salem's 2006 anthology and in Al Wafd daily and Al Arabi magazine did not cause any stir. In addition to the ban, the magazine was harshly criticized by Hamdi Rizq writing for Almasry Alyoum, a daily in Egypt, due to its publication of the poem. The ban and license revoking were reversed on appeal in June 2009.

== See also ==
List of magazines in Egypt
