= Badawiyya =

Sufi mystic order in Sunni Islam

The Badawiyyah, Sufi tariqah, was founded in the thirteenth century in Egypt by Ahmad al-Badawi (1199-1276). As a tariqah, the Badawiyyah lacks any distinct doctrines.

It was, however, extremely popular during both the Mamluk and Ottoman periods of Egypt. Mamluk Sultans often supported elaborate 'Mawlids' at the resting place of Shaykh Ahmed al-Badawi (or Sayyid Badawi as he is more commonly known) in the Nile Delta town of Tanta.

During the Ottoman period, this order spread to Turkey and there were several Tekkes or zawiyas in Istanbul many of which survived until the founding of the Turkish republic.

The mawlid of Sayyid Badawi is still celebrated in Egypt every year where the population of Tanta swells to almost double. Tents are placed in the streets around the Ahmad al-Badawi Mosque where Qur'an recitations and sermons by important scholars from al-Azhar Mosque are delivered.
