= Hegazi =

Hegazi or Hegazy (Egyptian Arabic: حجازي) is an Egyptian Arabic surname. Notable people with the surname include:

- Abdel Aziz Mohamed Hegazy (1923–2014), Egyptian politician
- Ahmed Hegazi (actor) (1935–2002), Egyptian actor
- Ahmed Hegazi (footballer) (born 1991), Egyptian footballer
- Ahmed Gaffer Hegazi (born 1948), Egyptian scientist
- Hussein Hegazi (1891–1961), Egyptian footballer
- Mahmoud Hegazy (born 1956), Egyptian general
- Mohammed Farid Hegazy (born 1954), Egyptian lieutenant general
- Mohammed Hegazy (born 1982), Egyptian convert to Christianity
- Morsi El Sayed Hegazy, Egyptian academic and economist
- Safwat Hegazi (born 1963), Egyptian imam
- Salama Hegazi (1852–1917), Egyptian musician
- Sarah Hegazi (1989–2020), Egyptian queer activist
