= Ahmad al-Badawi Mosque =

Mosque in Tanta, Egypt

- مسجد أحمد البدوي
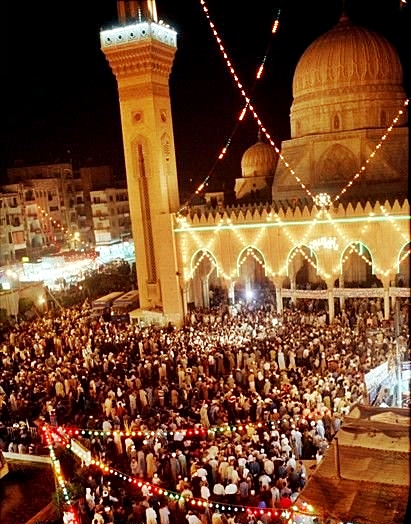
- The mosque during the Mawlid celebration of Ahmad al-Badawi

- Location of the mosque in the Nile Delta

Religion
- Affiliation: Sunni Islam
- Rite: Sufism
- Festival: Mawlid
- Ecclesiastical or organisational status: Mosque; Shrine
- Status: Active
- Dedication: Ahmad al-Badawi

Location
- Location: Tanta, Gharbia Governorate
- Country: Egypt
- Interactive map of Ahmad al-Badawi Mosque
- Coordinates: 30°59′56″N 30°47′01″E

Architecture
- Type: Mosque
- Style: Mamluk
- Founder: Mamluk Sultan Al-Nasir Muhammad
- Completed: c. 1276 CE

Specifications
- Dome: 3
- Minaret: 3
- Shrine: 1: (Ahmad al-Badawi)

The Ahmad al-Badawi Mosque (Arabic: مسجد أحمد البدوي) is a Sufi mosque and shrine complex in Tanta, in the Gharbia Governorate of Egypt. The mosque's name is derived from the Sufi mystic Ahmad al-Badawi, the founder of the Badawiyya Sufi order, who is buried in the shrine of the building. The mosque is also the largest and most-visited mosque in Tanta.

== History ==
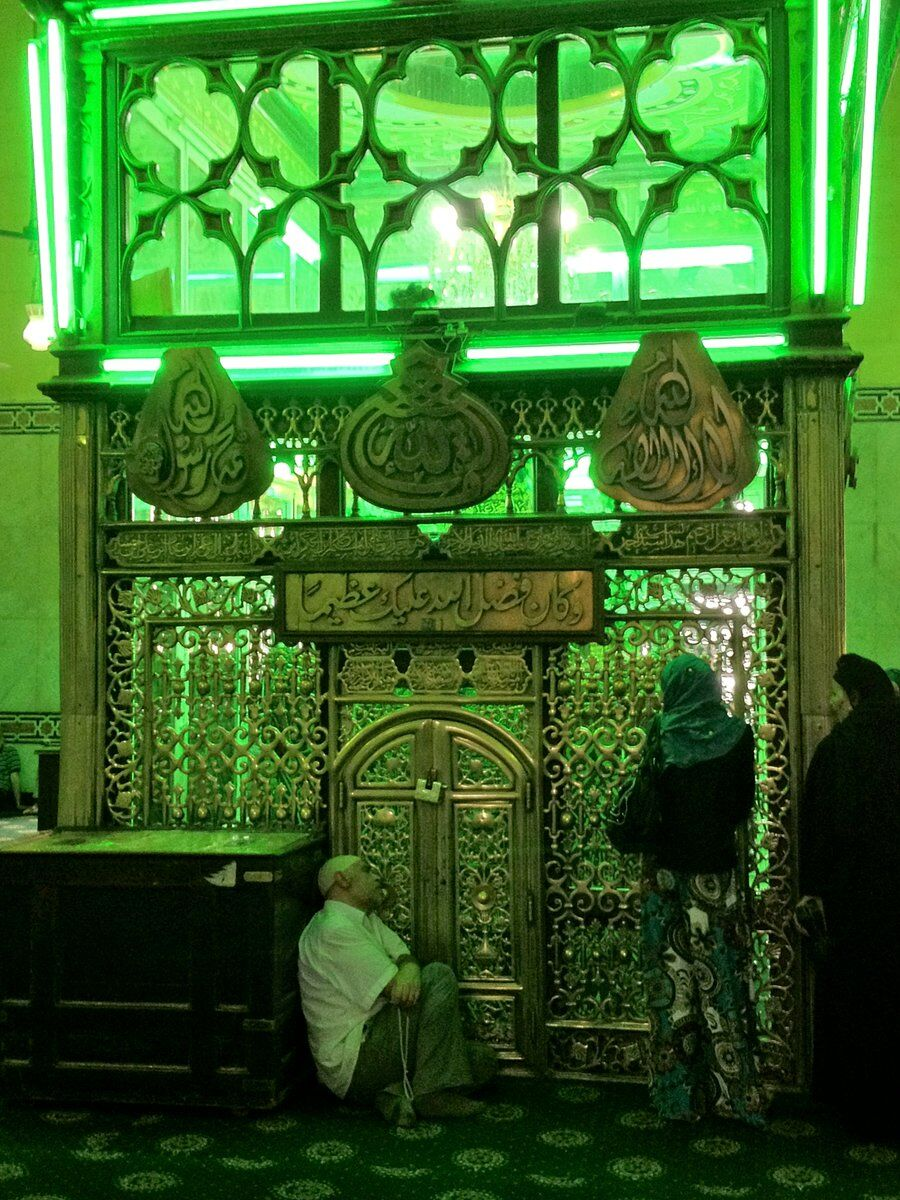
The grave of al-Badawi inside the mosque, in 2012.

After the death of Ahmad al-Badawi in the 13th century CE, his trusted student Abd al-Mu'tal succeeded him and built a khanqah next to his grave. This khanqah was eventually demolished and the site was incorporated into a mosque by the Mamluk Sultan Al-Nasir Muhammad. It was further expanded by Sultan Qaytbay. Years later, on the orders of Ali Bey al-Kabir, the Mamluk governor of the Ottoman Empire, a metal zarih was built around the grave of Ahmad al-Badawi. In the 1960s, the mosque received a new pair of minarets and an iwan. In 1975, during the presidency of Anwar Sadat, the mosque was further expanded.

== Architecture ==
Built in the Mamluk style, muqarnas were used in both exterior and interior design of the mosque. The mihrab incorporates pieces of rare mosaic material. The mosque also includes a collection of his possessions, including his rosary, which is 10 metres (33 ft) long and contains a thousand beads. His turban, garb, and wooden staff are also preserved in the mosque's private collection.

== Mawlid of Ahmad al-Badawi ==
The birthday celebration of Ahmad al-Badawi, known as the Mawlid (Milad) is celebrated every year. During this time and on Ramadan, special sweet candies, named after the saint, are sold at the entrance of the mosque.

== See also ==
- Islam in Egypt
- List of mosques in Egypt
- Mahmud Ali al-Banna
