= Ahmad al-Badawi =

13th-century Moroccan founder of Badawiyyah Sufi order

Sidi Quṭb Shaykh al-ʿArab Aḥmad al-Badawī
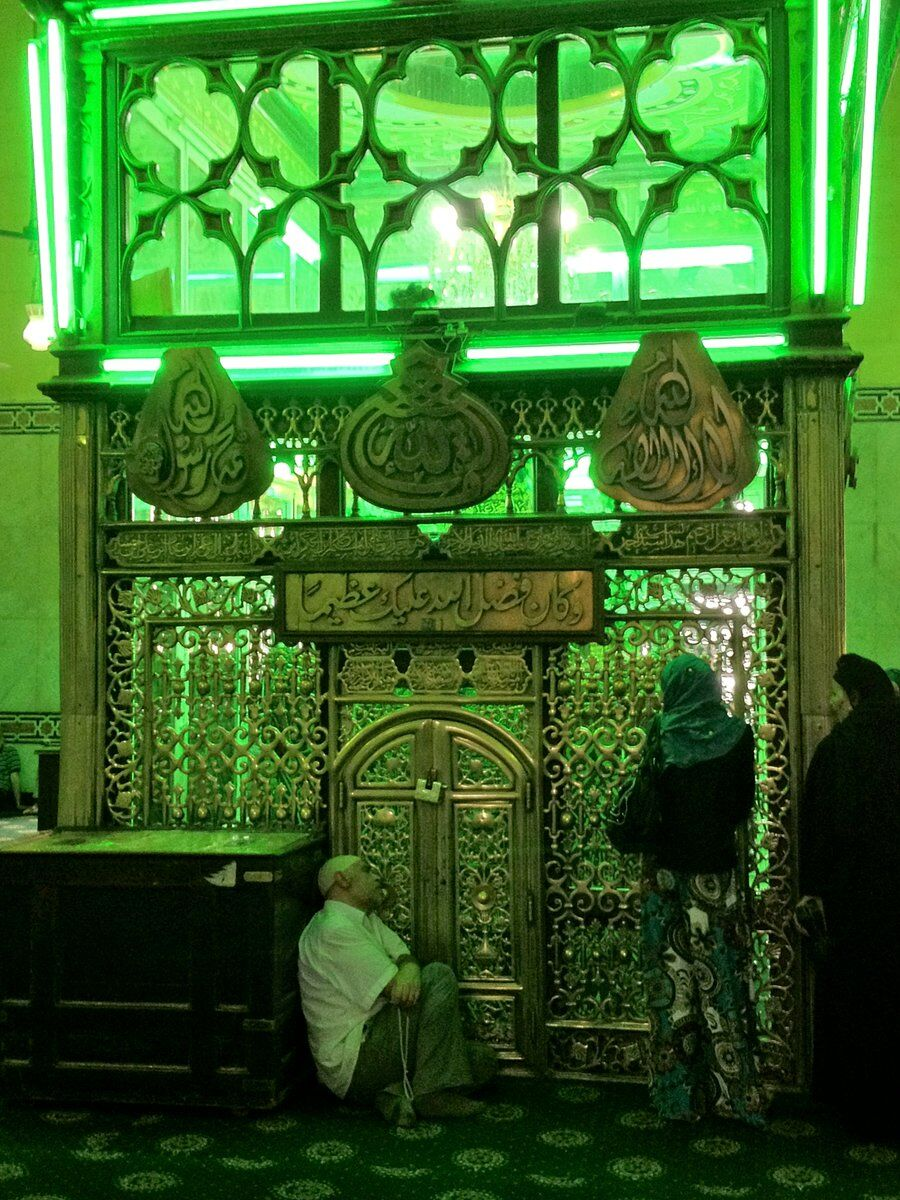
- Grave of Ahmad al-Badawi in Ahmad al-Badawi Mosque, Tanta, Egypt (2025)

Mystic, Jurist
- Born: 1200 CE (596 AH); Fez, Almohad Caliphate (present-day Morocco)
- Died: 1276 CE (674 AH); Tanta, Mamluk Sultanate (present-day Egypt)
- Venerated in: In some versions of Sufism
- Major shrine: Mosque of Aḥmad al-Badawī, Tanta, Egypt
- Feast: A few days every October (mawlid)
- Tradition or genre: Sufi Islam (Jurisprudence: Maliki)
- Arabic name
- Personal (Ism): Aḥmad
- Teknonymic (Kunya): Abū al-Fityān
- Toponymic (Nisba): al-Badawī al-Maqdisī al-Qudsī al-Qurashī

Aḥmad al-Badawī (Egyptian Arabic: أحمد البدوى, Egyptian Arabic pronunciation: [ˈæħmæd elˈbædæwi]), also known as al-Sayyid al-Badawī (السيد البدوى [esˈsæjjed elˈbædæwi]), was a 13th-century Arab Sufi Muslim mystic and spiritual adept, immensely revered in Egypt, who became famous as the founder of the Badawiyyah Sufi order. He was born in Fes, Morocco, into a Bedouin tribe originally from the Syrian Desert.

Described as boisterous in his youth, al-Badawī underwent some form of inner conversion around 627 AH, after which he withdrew from ordinary human contact, including marriage, in order to seek God alone. He made pilgrimages to the tombs of several great Sufis, including al-Jīlī and al-Ḥallāj. In 1236 he settled permanently at Tandiṭā (Tanta) in Egypt, where he adopted still more ascetic practices.

Al-Badawī acquired an exceptional posthumous reputation, being described as "one of the greatest saints in the Arab world" and perhaps the most popular of the Sufi saints of Egypt. His tomb consequently remained a major site of ziyara, or devotional visitation, for Sufis in the region. After his death in 1276, ʿAbd al-ʿĀl succeeded him as his khalīfa and organized his followers under a strict rule.

== History ==
He was born in and brought up in Fez. According to several medieval chronicles, al-Badawi hailed from an Arab tribe of Syrian origin. He was referred to as a Sharif as he traced his genealogy to Ali. His father was called ʿAlī al-Badrī and his mother was a North African Berber called Fatima. A Sufi Muslim by persuasion, al-Badawi entered the Rifaʽi sufi order (founded by the renowned Shafi'i mystic and jurist Ahmad al-Rifaʽi [d. 1182]) in his early life, being initiated into the order at the hands of a particular Iraqi teacher. After a trip to Mecca, al-Badawi is said to have travelled to Iraq, "where his sainthood believed to have clearly manifested itself" through the karamat "miracles" he is said to have performed. In Iraq, he visited the tombs of Adi ibn Musafir and Al-Hallaj.

Eventually al-Badawi went to Tanta in the Sultanate of Egypt, where he settled for good in 1236. According to the various traditional biographies of the saint's life, al-Badawi gathered forty Sufi disciples around him during this period, who are collectively said to have "dwelt on the city's rooftop terraces," whence his spiritual order were informally named the "roof men" (aṣḥāb el-saṭḥ) in the vernacular. al-Sayyid al-Badawi died in Tanta in 1276, being seventy-six years old.

== Spiritual lineage ==
As with every other major Sufi order, the Badawiyya proposes an unbroken spiritual chain of transmitted knowledge going back to Muhammad through one of his Companions, which in the Badawi's case is Ali (d. 661). In this regard, Idries Shah quotes al-Badawi: "Sufi schools are like waves which break upon rocks: [they are] from the same sea, in different forms, for the same purpose."

== See also ==
- Ibrahim al-Desuqi, a contemporary and founder of the Burhaniyya.
- List of Sufis
