= Kamal Amin =

Egyptian artist

- Born: 30 May 1923; Tanta, Egypt
- Died: 15 July 1979 (aged 56); Cairo, Egypt
- Known for: Graphic

Kamal Amin Awad (Arabic: كمال أمين عوض) 30 May 1923 – 15 July 1979) was a pioneering Egyptian artist in the field of graphic arts.

== Biography ==
Amin was born in Cairo, Egypt in 1928. He studied at the Institute of book art in Urbino, Italy. He was interested in teaching his students about the modern techniques applied by schools abroad. However, he was keen to make use of the talents of his ancient forerunners in view of Egypt's rich Pharaonic, Coptic, Islamic and Folk arts. Accordingly, he succeeded in a unique style in his works. His masterpieces and unique techniques impressed Egyptian modern art. The artist's versatility helped him to work as a photographer, a sculptor, and an illustrator. He received the First Class Award of Art and Science in 1974.

== Personal life ==
Kamal Amin was married to a Swedish woman and had two children.

== Exhibitions ==
Special exhibitions

- 1945 – held special exhibitions of his work in the city of Urbino, Italy
- 1956 exhibition in Paris
- 1957, 1978 exhibitions in Cairo
- 1966, 1969, 1971, 1976 Gallery in Sweden

International exhibitions

- 1954 International Exhibition of Youth in Gorizia, Italy
- 1962 São Paulo Art Biennial.
- 1971 Egyptian Art Exhibition in Paris.
- 1968, 1970, 1972, 1974 International Biennial of Kraków, Poland
- 1961, 1967 International Bienniale of graphic arts of Ljubljana, Yugoslavia
- 1968, 1972, 1976 International Bienniale of Florence, Italy
- 1964, 1972, 1976, 1978 International Bienniale of Verchen, West Germany
- 1960, 1976 Venice Biennale, Italy.
- 1972 Egyptian Art Exhibition.
- 1973 International Exhibition of Miniature Graphics Norway
- 1973 International Exhibition of Fine Arts, Spain
- 1973 Contemporary Egyptian Art Exhibition, Netherlands
- 1974 Egyptian Art Exhibition, Japan
- Traveling exhibition of Egyptian art in Italy, Yugoslavia and Hungary
- Exhibition of Egyptian artists in Moscow and India

== Awards ==
National Awards

- 1949 Honor Award and a gold medal in graphics and decoration of the agro-industrial exhibition
- 1951 State Award in Arts (branch of graphics) and was called (Ismail Award for the Arts)
- 1958, 1960 Prizes for the first graphic fairs Cairo Salon
- Galaa Revolution Award
- 1960 First prize in the sculpture competition for the terminal building in Luxor with the implementation of the project
- 1965 First prize in the Mosaic contest for the building of the province of Beni Suef with the implementation of the project
- Second prize in the Alavrsk competition for the court complex building
- Third prize in the Alavrsk contest of Central Cairo
- 1973 State Incentive Award of Art (branch of graphics)
- 1974 First prize in the contest of October 6
- 1974 Medal of Science from the first class

International Awards

- Holdings Awards in the International Biennale Exhibition of the basin of the Mediterranean Sea in Alexandria
- 1968 Honor Award from the UNESCO and the International Fair for graphics, Poland

== Official holdings ==
- The Egyptian Modern Art Museum
- Jordan National Gallery Of Fine Arts
