= Yannis Yfantis =

Greek poet (born 1949)

Yannis Yfantis is a Greek poet who is awarded with the Cavafy Award. He was born in 1949 in Raina near Agrinio in Aetolia-Acarnania. He was presented to the Thessaloniki Public Broadcasting with Elliniki kai pagkosmia poiisi (Ελληνική και παγκόσμια ποίηση = Greek And International Poetry) and Kata vathos to thema ine ena (Κατά βάθος το θέμα είναι ένα). His poems were translated into several languages including English.

== Poetry ==
- Mystiki tis Anatolis (Μυστικοί της Ανατολής = Secrets From The East) (1980)
- Ancient Edda (1983)
- O Kathreftis tou Protea (Ο Καθρέφτης του Πρωτέα = The Mirror of Protea) (1986])
- Naos tou Kosmou (Ναός του Κόσμου = The Temple Of The World) (1996)
- O Kipos tis Poiisis (Ο Κήπος της Ποίησης = The Garden Of Poetry) (2000)
- Arhetypa (Αρχέτυπα = Archetype) (2001)
