= Ali Hijazi =

Sierra Leonean basketball player

Personal information
- Born: November 23, 1976 (age 49) Freetown, Sierra Leone
- Listed height: 6 ft 3 in (1.91 m)
- Position: F/C

Career history
- 2004–: Sierra Leone

Ali Hijazi (born November 23, 1976) is a former Sierra Leonean international basketball player and the current manager of the Sierra Leone national basketball team. He has been the coach of the national basketball team since 2004. Hijazi was born in Freetown, the capital city of Sierra Leone to parents of Lebanese descent. He is a father of three girls; Rayan, Maya and Alina. Hijazi is the current President of the Sierra Leone Basketball Federation (SLBF).

Ali Hijazi is the current President of the Sierra Leone Basketball Federation (SLBF).

Hijazi is also a businessman and the current exclusive agent of Philip Morris.
