= Sahar El Mougy =

Egyptian novelist and academic

Sahar El Mougy (سحر الموجي) is an Egyptian novelist and academic. She teaches English Literature and American Studies at Cairo University. She has published several novels and short story collections. Her most celebrated work, Noon, published in 2007, won the Cavafis Award.

She has served as a judge for the Arabic Booker Prize.
