= Nawal Hijazi =

Lebanese voice actress

- نوال حجازي
- Born: Lebanon
- Occupation: Voice actress

Nawal Hijazi (Arabic: نوال حجازي) is a Lebanese voice actress.

== Filmography ==
=== Dubbing roles ===
- Around the World with Willy Fog
- Arrow Emblem: Hawk of the Grand Prix - Rie Katori
- Astroganger
- Clémentine
- Hello! Sandybell - Sandybell
- Inspector Gadget - Penny
- Lightspeed Electroid Albegas
- Manga Aesop Monogatari
- Manga Sarutobi Sasuke - Yuki
- Moomin - Moominmamma (Lebanese dub)
- My Pet Monster
- Nobody's Boy: Remi - Arthur Milligan, Lise Acquin, Benjamin Acquin (Lebanese dub)
- Pole Position
- Rainbow Brite
- Serendipity the Pink Dragon
- Sport Billy - Lilly
- The Adventures of Pepero - Chuchu, Narrator (Lebanese dub)
- The Adventures of Teddy Ruxpin
- The Care Bears (Lebanese dub)
- The Littles
- The Many Dream Journeys of Meme
- Time Travel Tondekeman - Yumi
- Tom Clancy's The Division
- Treasure Island - Jim's mother (first voice), Lily (Lebanese dub)
- UFO Robot Grendizer - Hikaru Makiba (Lebanese dub)
