= Mohamed Mansi Qandil =

Egyptian novelist and author (born 1946)

- Born: 1949 (age 76–77); El Mahalla El Kubra
- Citizenship: Egypt
- Occupations: Writer, Physician, Novelist, Screenwriter, Film screenwriter

Mohamed Mansi Qandil (Arabic: محمد المنسي قنديل; born 1946) is an Egyptian novelist and author.

== Early life ==
His father was a simple labourer. Qandil went to medical school and worked as a country doctor before turning to writing as a full-time profession. He lived in Kuwait for several years, where he was an editor at the monthly magazine Al Arabi. As of 2015 he was the editor of the Egyptian magazine Ibdaa.

== Career ==
Qandil's first novel was called Breaking of the Spirit and dealt with the subject of workers' unrest in the delta region. Another novel Moon Over Samarqand was inspired by a conversation with a taxi driver he had met in Uzbekistan. This novel won the Sawiris Foundation Award in 2006. An English translation of Moon over Samarqand by Jennifer Peterson has been published by AUC Press. His 2010 novel A Cloudy Day on the West Side was shortlisted for the Arabic Booker Prize. An English translation by Barbara Romaine has been published by Syracuse University Press.

Apart from novels, Qandil has also published short story collections and children's books.

== Awards and honours ==
Qandil won the Egyptian State Incentive Award in 1988.

== Selected works ==
- Breaking of the Spirit (novel)
- Moon over Samarqand (novel)
- A Cloudy Day on the West Side (novel)
- A Dinner with Aisha (short stories)
