= Ahmed Hegazy (pharmacist) =

Egyptian-German pharmacist (1939–2021)

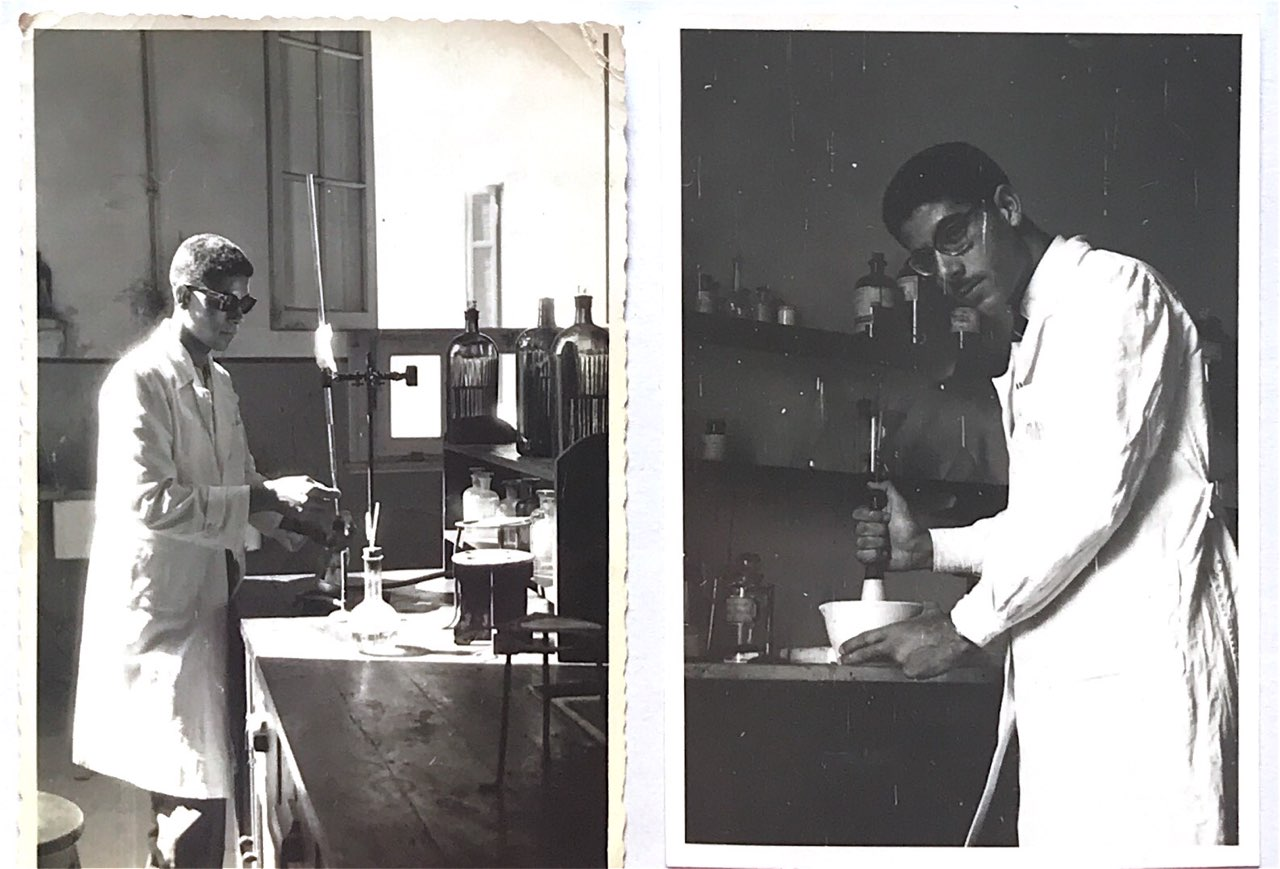
Studies of pharmacy, Cairo 1959 and 1960

Ahmed Hegazy (also: Hegasy; Arabic أحمد حجازي, Aḥmad Ḥiǧāzī, born October 24, 1939, in Cairo; died February 5, 2021, in Leverkusen) was an Egyptian-German pharmacist. He conducted research in the Pharmaceutical Technology Department of Bayer from 1966 to 1999, during which time he invented a new galenic formulation for the active components nifedipine and nimodipine. By blocking calcium channels, the substance has a relaxing effect on vascular muscles and is therefore used for the treatment of hypertension. In 1991, Hegazy received the Otto Bayer Medal for the solubilization of poorly soluble ingredients such as nimodipine. His galenic invention is still the basis for many modern formulations at Bayer AG (A. Ohm).

== Life ==
Letter Dr K. Schauerte, patent rights Adalat, 1987. Source: Family archive.

Ahmed Hegazy was born in Cairo in 1939 as the youngest of seven siblings. As shown in his high school diploma, he passed the matriculation examination in 1955 in the natural sciences branch as 296th out of 10,445 students. After studying pharmacy at Cairo University, he was sent to West Germany in 1961 by a United Arab Republic study mission on a scholarship for a Ph.D. at the Technical University of Braunschweig. In 1966, he received his doctorate supervised by Walther Awe with a thesis on "Contributions to the analytics of pantothenic acid and pantothenol." Since 1966, he worked at Bayer in Leverkusen, first as plant manager at the penicillin factory, then as laboratory manager in galenics and finally as head of department in the Institute for Pharmaceutical Technology for Liquid and Semi-Solid Pharmaceutical Forms. From 1977 onward he researched the administration of nifedipine, which brought the drug to world market maturity under the name Adalat retard. In his spare time, he was a passionate botanist. He retired in 1999 and died in Leverkusen in 2021.

== Work ==
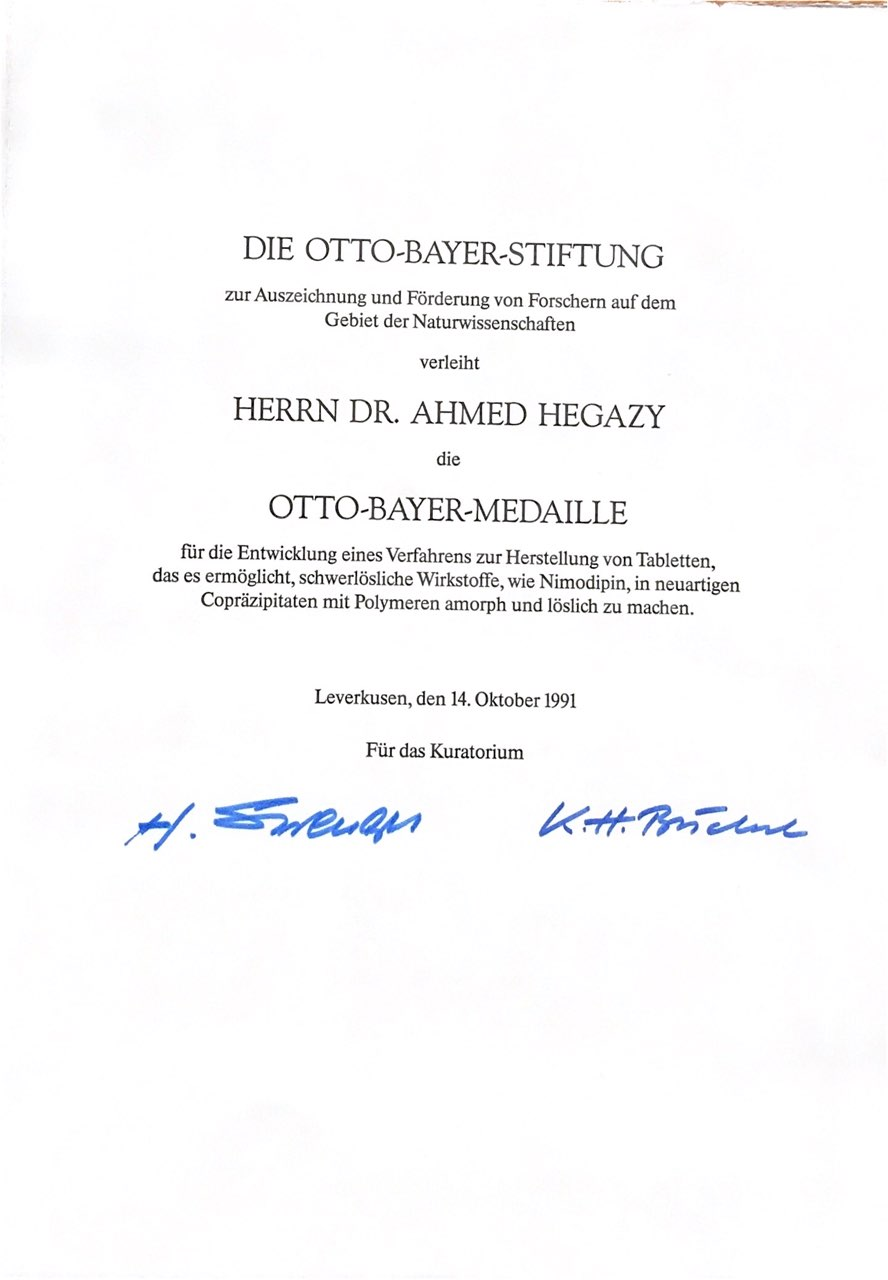
Award certificate Otto-Bayer prize, 1991

On September 9, 1980, Bayer patented a solid drug preparation containing nifedipine for Ahmed Hegazy and Klaus-Dieter Rämsch at the German Patent Office in Munich (No. DE3033919 and EP0047899). The surface area of 1–4 m^{2}/g resulted in the best absorption effect and a release over up to 36h. Previously, nifedipine was administered as a soft gelatin capsule. This was very light-sensitive and could not be manufactured by the company itself. The production of the capsules had to be outsourced to the company R.P. Scherer. In addition, the gelatin shell contained pork skins and could thus not be exported worldwide. The Adalat retard tablet, on the other hand, used iron oxide as light protection. The Bayer AG secured the patent in more than 40 countries.

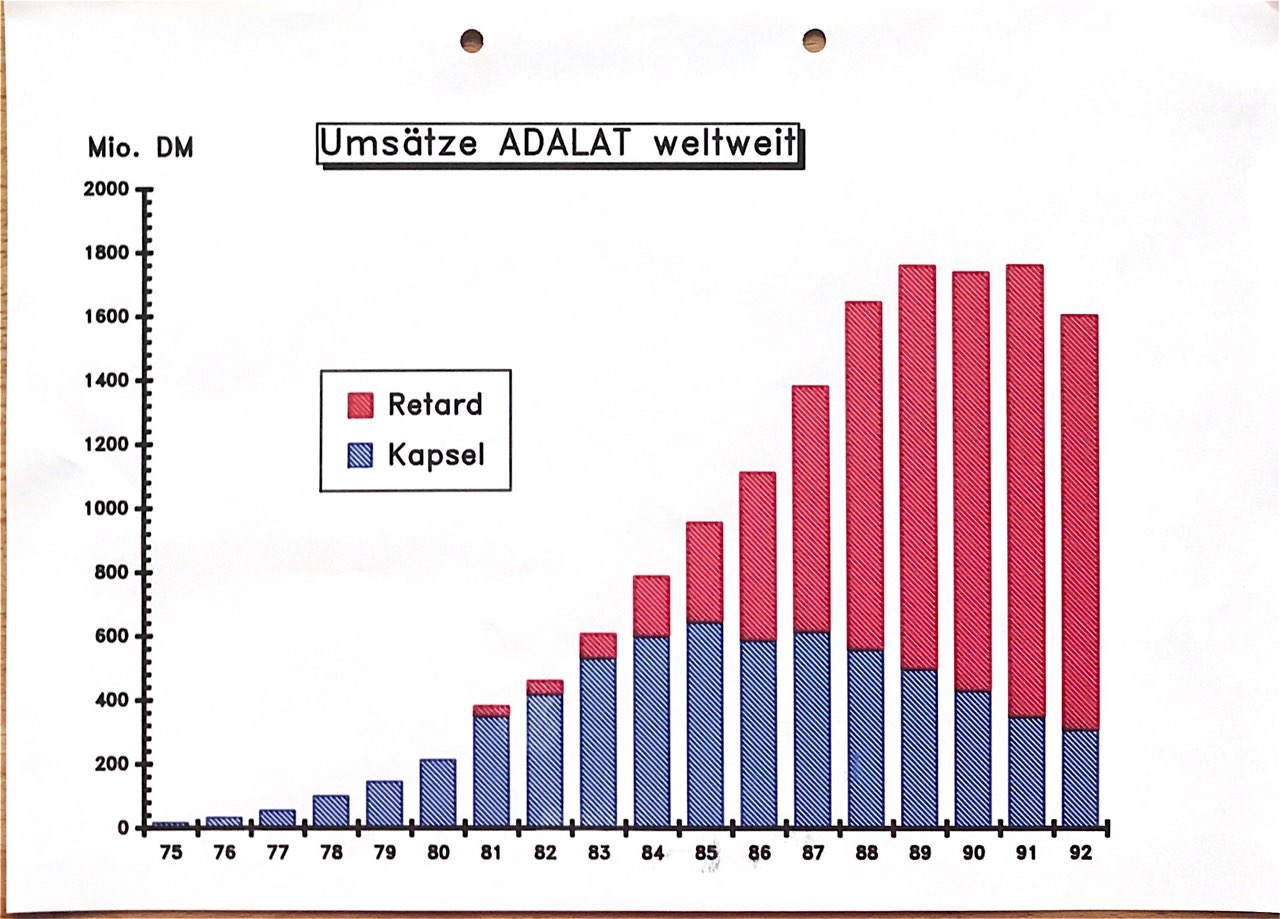
Sales Adalat and Adalat retard globally between 1975 and 1992

In the 1990s Adalat replaced Aspirin as the Bayer Group's largest single product for two reasons: The expansion of the indication to include hypertension in 1985, and a once-a-day regimen due to the invention of the retard tablet. Both led to substantive increase in global sales. By 2001, turnover had risen to €975 mio. The rise of Adalat retard after 1990 is a paradigmatic case for the success of already established medication due to new forms of administration "even though the drug had already been on the market for a quarter of a century," writes a study by the Erfurt University of Applied Sciences on. Today, it is still one of Bayer's 15 most important pharmaceutical products. In a legal dispute between Bayer and Pfizer in the US in 1995, it was established that Pfizer's product Procardia XL was based on this patent (Patent No. US5264446). Ahmed Hegazy was involved in ten other patents of the Bayer group.
