= Farouk Shousha =

Egyptian poet

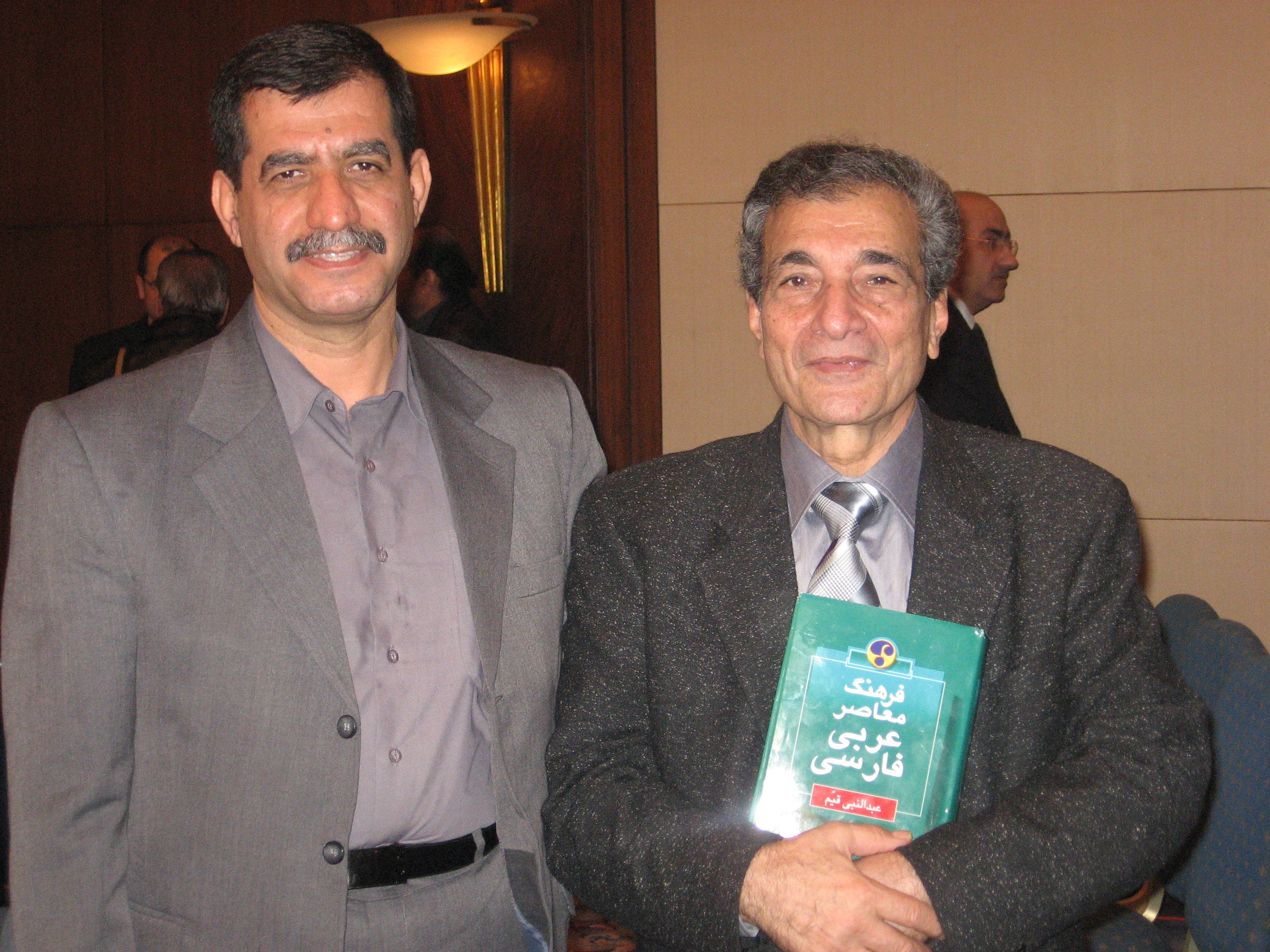
Farouk Shousha right) and Abdulnabi Ghayem

Farouk Shousha (Arabic: فاروق شوشة; January 9, 1936 – October 14, 2016) was an Egyptian poet. He hosted the popular television program Umsiya Thaqafiya ("Cultural Evening") from 1977 through 2006.

== Early life ==
Shousha was born in Damietta, where he attended kuttab. He credited the kuttab with having provided him "a strong foundation of language". When a cholera epidemic led to his confinement at home, Shousha read poetry to pass the time. Afterwards, he began a programmatic reading of Arabic poetry at the local library, where he read everything from the pre-Islamic period through contemporary poets. Of the Damietta library, Shousha related that, "It was there that my first poems were born."

== Career ==
Shousha attended Dar al-Ulum, where he became known as the Students' Poet. After graduation, he began working as a radio presenter. Eventually, he rose to be Director of Egyptian Radio. Later, Shousha entered the field of television. Throughout his media career, Shousha was associated with cultural and literary programs.

In 2005, Shousha was named Secretary-General of the Arabic Language Academy, a body described by Al-Ahram Weekly as "the guardians of the language". In his role as Secretary-General, Shousha was critical of what he considered to be a decline in the quality of Arabic in Egypt, a problem he attributed to radio and television announcers, poor teaching standards and the lack of libraries in schools. Shousha described the problem as "an issue of national security".

The first volume of Shousha's Collected Poems was published in 1985, and the second volume in 2007. Concerning the volumes' publication, Shousha remarked, "I am happy to be honored during my lifetime, not, as is the case with so many intellectuals, long after I die."

In 2018, in his honor, Google changed its logo to a doodle of him in nine countries across the Middle East on what would have been his 82 birthday.

== Selected awards ==
Shousha won the following honors, among others:

- State Encouragement Award for Poetry (1986)
- Kfafis International Prize for Poetry (1994)
- Saudi Yemeni Prize for Poetry (1994)
- State Recognition Prize for Literature (1997)
