= Abdallah Hijazi =

Lebanese basketball player

Sporting Al Riyadi Beirut
- Position: Forward
- League: Lebanese Basketball League

Personal information
- Born: Saida, Lebanon

Career information
- Playing career: 2002–present

Abdallah Hijazi is a Lebanese basketball player with Sporting Al Riyadi Beirut of the Lebanese Basketball League.
