= Ahmed Gaffer Hegazi =

- أحمد جعفر حجازي
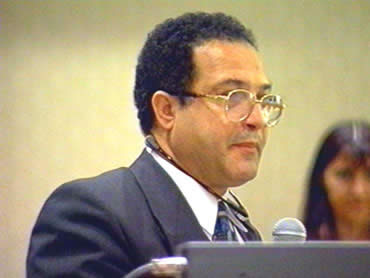
- Prof. Dr. Ahmed Gaffer Hegazi
- Born: May 31, 1948 (age 78); El Mansoura, Egypt
- Education: Cairo University (MS 1979, PhD 1981)
- Known for: Research on therapeutic applications of bee propolis and natural products
- Awards: First Class Decoration of Excellence (1995); Senior Scientist Prize of National Research Center (1996); Merit Award in Medical Sciences (2016)
- Scientific career
- Fields: Zoonotic diseases, apitherapy, bee products research

Ahmed Hegazi (or Ahmed Gaffer Hegazi; احمد جعفر حجازى) (born May 31, 1948) is currently a Professor of Microbiology and Immunology in the department of Zoonotic Diseases, National Research Centre, Egypt. Hegazi received his master's degree in 1979, and his PhD in 1981. Hegazi's research work has been focused lately on bee products and their therapeutic effects.

Hegazi organized and contributed to national and international research projects since 1977; he has been the principal investigator on multiple research projects within the National Research Center. He has published 166 scientific papers and articles in national and international journals. He also served on the board of multiple national and international scientific journals.

Hegazi is also the president of the Egyptian Environmental Society for Uses and Production of Bee Products, secretary of the Egyptian Society of Apitherapy, secretary general of the African Federation of Apiculture Associations, and a member of the International Apitherapy Commission (APIMONDIA).

== Awards ==
- First Class Decoration of Excellence, Egypt, 1995
- The Senior Scientist Prize of National Research Center, Cairo, Egypt, 1996
- The National Scientific Prize In Biological Sciences, Egypt, 1990
- The Scientific Prize of The National Research Center, Cairo, Egypt, 1989
- The Second Best Research Paper Award, International Congress of Propolis, Bones Airs, Argentina, 2000
- Main Speaker Award, 10th Academic Conference, PRA and NAS (Nippon Apitherapy Soc.) Japan, 2006
- 2 Bronze medals from The International Innovation Fair of the Middle East, Kuwait, 2007

== Patents ==
- Patent No. 8901 at 22/08/2006: A novel drug from natural products with new therapeutic modalities in treatment of psoriasis
- Patent No. 1005 at 02/01/2006: A novel drug from natural resources for controlling Fascioliasis
- Patent No. 270: at 01/06/2005: A novel drug from medicinal plants with antiatherosclerotic (hypocholesterolaemic), antioxidant and cardio protective properties.
- Patent No. 272: at 01/06/2005: A novel drug from natural resources with antiatherosclerotic (hypocholesterolaemic), antioxidant and cardio protective properties.

== Scientific activities ==
Referee in the following International Journals:

- Journal of Planta Medica, 2005
- Journal of Evidence Based Complementary and Alternative Medicine, 2006
- International Journal of Radiation Biology, 2007
