= Ahmad Hegazi =

Egyptian cartoonist

Ahmad Hegazi (cartoonist)
- Born: May 13, 1936; Alexandria
- Died: October 21, 2011 (aged 75)
- Occupations: Cartoonist; Writer; Caricaturist

Ahmad Ebrahim Hegazi (1936–2011) was an Egyptian satirical cartoonist, known for his criticism of politicians and society.
