= Ahmed Hijazi (poet) =

Egyptian contemporary poet (born 1935)

Ahmed Abdel Muti Hijazi (Arabic: أحمد عبد المعطي حجازي) (born in 1935 in Al-Menoufiya, Egypt) is an Egyptian contemporary poet.

Contributed to many literary conferences in many Arab capitals, and is one of the pioneers of the movement of renewal in contemporary Arabic poetry.

== Education ==
Bachelor of Arts, Department of Sociology at the University of Sorbonne, France, in 1979.

== Positions held ==
He was the managing editor of Rose al-Yūsuf magazine. In France he worked as a professor of Arabic poetry at the Paris 8 University and the new Sorbonne University. He returned to Cairo and worked for Al-Ahram newspaper. He served as editor-in-chief of Ibdaa magazine from 1990 to 2002 when he resigned from the post. He was reappointed editor-in-chief of the magazine in 2006.

== Poetry works ==
- City Without A Heart, 1959.
- Uras, 1959.
- Nothing Remains but Confession, 1965
- Elegy of the Beautiful life, 1972
- Creatures of the Kingdom of the Night, 1978.
- Cement Trees, 1989.
- Ruins of Time, 2011.
- Me and the city, 1957.

== Writings ==
- Muhammad and those
- Ibrahim Nagi
- Khalil Mutran
- An interview Tuesday
- My poetry
- Other cities
- Arabism of Egypt
- Ahmed Shawqi grandchildren

== Awards ==
- Was awarded the 1989 Egyptian-Greek Cavafy
- Egyptian State incentive prize in literature of the Supreme Council of Culture, 1997
- African Poetry Prize, 1996

== See also ==
- List of Egyptians
