= Gharbia Governorate =

Governorate in Egypt

- Governorate
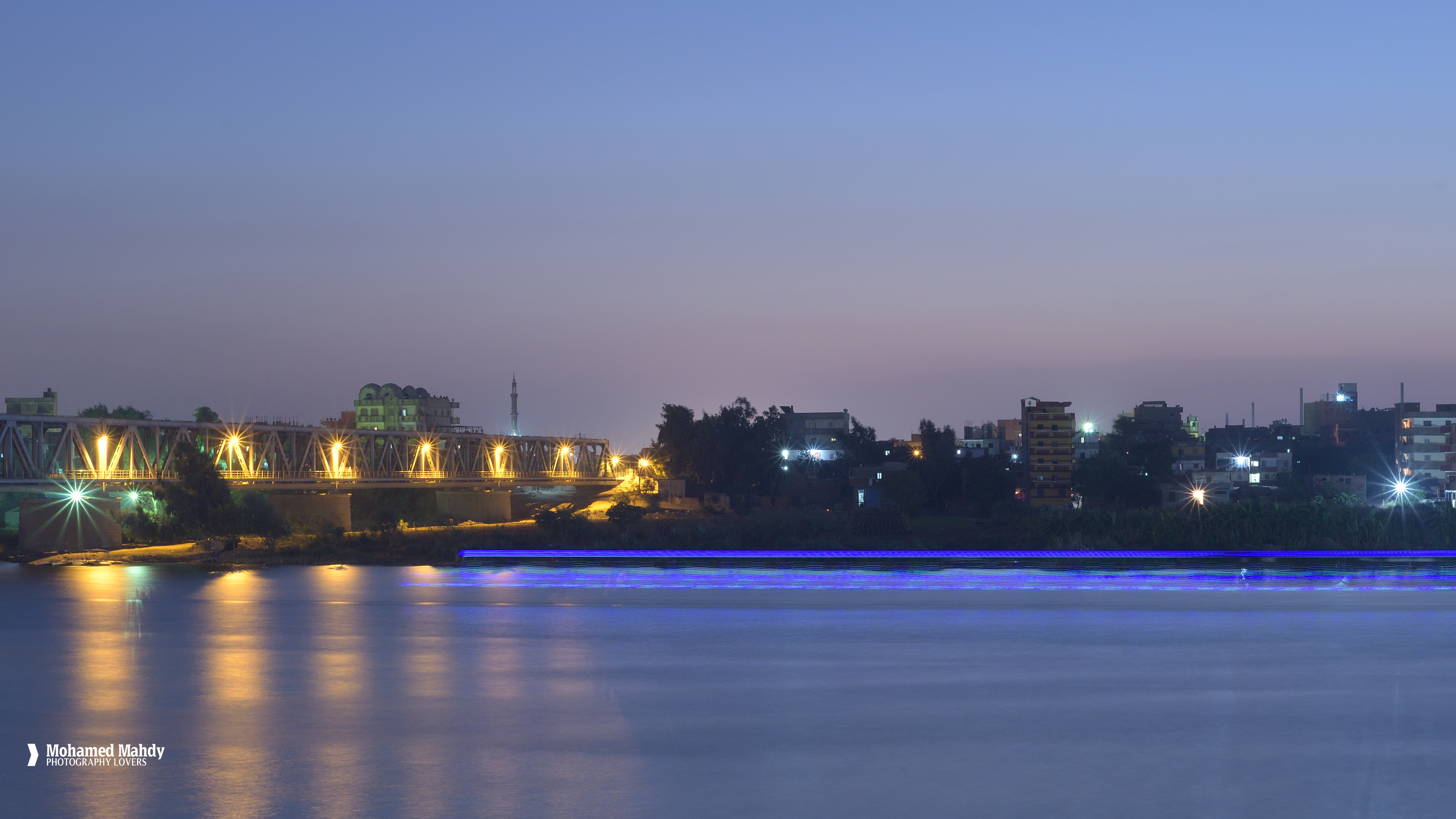
- The Nile in Kafr Az-Zayyat, Gharbia

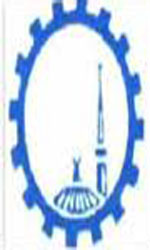
- Flag

- Gharbia Governorate on the map of Egypt
- Coordinates: 30.867°N 31.028°E
- Country: Egypt
- Seat: Tanta (capital)

Government
  - Governor: Ashraf Magdi Ibrahim El-Gendy

Area
  - Total: 1,942 km^{2} (750 sq mi)

Population (January 2023)
  - Total: 5,409,714
  - Density: 2,786/km^{2} (7,215/sq mi)

GDP
  - Total: EGP 174 billion (US$ 11.1 billion)
- Time zone: UTC+2 (EGY)
  - Summer (DST): UTC+3 (EEST)
- HDI (2021): 0.743 high · 9th

Gharbia (Egyptian Arabic: محافظة الغربية Muḥāfaẓat al-Gharbiyya, IPA: [elɣɑɾˈbejjɑ, -jæ], "the western governorate") is one of the governorates of Egypt. It is located in the north of the country, south of Kafr El Sheikh Governorate, and north of Monufia Governorate. Its capital is Tanta, which is 90 km north of Cairo, and 120 km south east of Alexandria. The largest city in Gharbia is El Mahalla El Kubra. The total area of Gharbia governorate is 1,942 km^{2}.

Gharbia's known history dates back to the Pharaonic era, during which its territory was part of three ancient administrative districts centered around Abu Sir, Samannoud, and Sa El Hagar. These cities held religious and political significance in ancient Egypt: Abu Sir was a pilgrimage site, Sa El Hagar was a religious and medical hub during the early dynastic period, and also the capital of Tefnakht, who unified the Delta and Middle Egypt under his rule. It later became the center of the Twenty-fourth Dynasty of Egypt, which played a role in reuniting Egypt following fragmentation under Nubian and Assyrian occupation, and was followed by the Twenty-sixth Dynasty of Egypt, whose king Amyrtaeus expelled the Persians from Egypt.

The name "Gharbia" (meaning "western") was adopted during the Islamic era, referring to its location west of the Damietta branch of the Nile. The governorate witnessed significant events in modern Egyptian history, including resistance to the French Campaign in 1798, particularly in Tanta, whose resistance day is now commemorated as the governorate’s national day. The region also played an active role in the Egyptian Revolution of 1919 against British occupation of Egypt, notably during the Republic of Zefta incident, where residents declared temporary independence from British control.

Today, Gharbia is an important economic center in Egypt. It is the country's largest producer of onions and the second-largest producer of grapes, in addition to producing key crops such as wheat, rice, and jasmine, the latter being a valuable cash crop. The governorate hosts several major industrial establishments, including Misr Spinning and Weaving Company in El Mahalla El Kubra, along with textile factories in Tanta, Samannoud, and Zefta, fertilizer and pesticide plants in Kafr El Zayat, food processing industries, perfume production, and pottery manufacturing in various towns across the region.

== Municipal divisions ==
The governorate is divided into eight administrative municipal divisions (markazes and kisms), with an estimated total population of 5,500,507 as of January 2023. In some cases, a markaz and a kism share the same name.

The administrative history of the governorate dates back to the early 19th century. During the rule of Muhammad Ali Pasha, Egypt was reorganized into administrative units (أخطاط) following a comprehensive land survey in 1813. By 1822, Gharbia had been subdivided into five districts. In 1825, the governorate was further reorganized into the following districts: Mahallat al‑Kubra (including Mahalla, Nabaruh, and Shirbin); Al Jaʿfariyah (including Jaʿfariyah and Tanta); Zifta (including Zifta and Mit Bera); Fuwa (including Balad al‑Arz and Idfinah); and Kafr El Sheikh (including Kafr El Sheikh and al‑Shabasat).

Administrative boundaries continued to change until the naming of districts (مراكز) was standardized in 1871. In 1896, 22 districts across Egypt, including six in Gharbia, were renamed.

In addition to the eight municipal divisions, the governorate comprises seven higher‑level administrative divisions, 71 local units, and 320 villages.

The largest urban and administrative center by both area and population is El Mahalla El Kubra, followed by Tanta. The highest population density is found in Tanta and El Mahalla El Kubra, while Samannud is the smallest center. Basyoun has the lowest overall population, and Qutur has the lowest population density.

Anglicized name	Native name	Arabic transliteration	Population (January 2023 est.)	Type
El Mahalla El Kubra	مركز المحله الكبرى	Al‑Maḥallah al‑Kubrā	829,692	Markaz
El Mahalla El Kubra 1	قسم أول المحلة الكبرى	Al‑Maḥallah al‑Kubrā 1	186,805	Kism (fully urban)
El Mahalla El Kubra 2	قسم ثان المحلة الكبرى	Al‑Maḥallah al‑Kubrā 2	289,541	Kism (fully urban)
El Mahalla El Kubra 3	قسم ثالث المحلة الكبرى	Al‑Maḥallah al‑Kubrā 3	133,652	Kism (fully urban)
El Sunta	مركز السنطة	As‑Sanṭah	507,934	Markaz
Basyoun	مركز بسيون	Basyūn	318,370	Markaz
Kafr El Zayat	مركز كفر الزيات	Kafr az‑Zayyāt	486,055	Markaz
Kotoor	مركز قطور	Quṭūr	357,643	Markaz
Samanoud	مركز سمنود	Samannūd	426,257	Markaz
Tanta	مركز طنطا	Ṭanṭā	716,116	Markaz
Tanta 1	قسم أول طنطا	Ṭanṭā 1	315,737	Kism (fully urban)
Tanta 2	قسم ثان طنطا	Ṭanṭā 2	277,863	Kism (fully urban)
Zefta	مركز زفتى	Ziftā	449,066	Markaz
Zefta (urban)	قسم زفتى	Ziftā	114,983	Kism (fully urban)

== Etymology ==
The name Gharbia (Arabic: الغربية, al-Gharbiyyah) derives from the Arabic root "غرب" (gh-r-b), meaning "west." The term al-Gharbiyyah translates to "the Western [province]" or "the Western one.". This designation reflects the governorate's geographic position relative to historical administrative centers, particularly Cairo and the Nile Delta.

== History ==
Archaeological evidence of Pharaonic remains found throughout the Gharbia Governorate indicates that the region was inhabited during ancient times. Egypt during the Pharaonic era was divided into administrative provinces (nomes), each with its own emblem and deity. The current area of the governorate was not part of a single nome nor did it worship a single deity. Notable nomes included the Fifth Lower Egyptian nome (Neith Mehyt, or Northern Neith) with its capital at Sais and deity Neith; the Ninth nome (Anzat) with its capital at Abu Sir and deity Anzati; and the Twelfth nome (Thab Netjer, the Sacred Bull) with its capital at Samannud and deity Onuris.

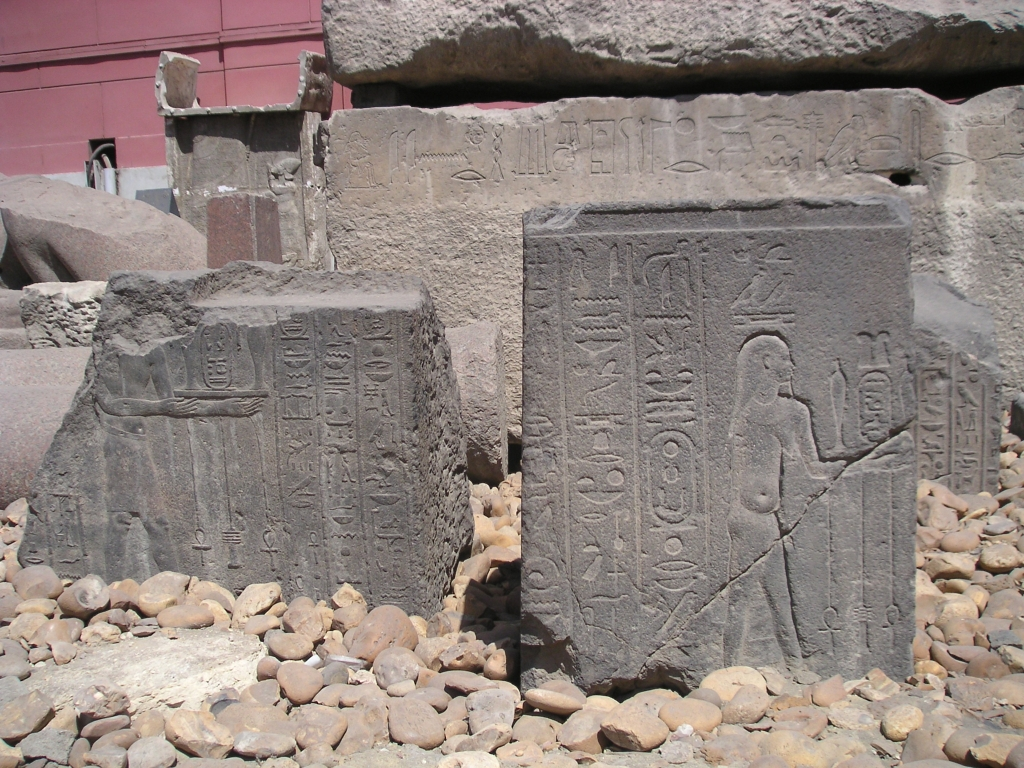
Wall-reliefs of Nectanebo II from Behbeit el-Hagar (on the left) and of Nectanebo I from Sebennytos (on right). 30th deynasty of Egypt

Sais held religious significance at the beginning of the Dynastic Period and was also a center for medical education. Abu Sir similarly served as a pilgrimage site. In 730 BCE, Tefnakht succeeded in uniting the Delta and Middle Egypt under his rule, founding the 24th Dynasty. He took advantage of the weakness of neighboring rulers and marched southward, but was eventually confronted and defeated by Piye, king of Kush. Tefnakht submitted to Piye’s rule but later reasserted his authority in the Delta. His successor Bakenranef faced invasions by the Kushite king Shabaka, who captured and executed him, ending the 24th Dynasty.

Necho I ruled Sais for eight years during the early Assyrian invasions. His allegiance fluctuated between the Assyrians and Kushites. He was succeeded by his son Psamtik I, who reigned for over fifty years, during which he expelled the Assyrians and unified Egypt, founding the 26th Dynasty. His son Necho II focused on naval expansion and military campaigns against Syria and the Kingdom of Judah. He was followed by Psamtik II, Apries, Amasis II, and Psamtik III, who was defeated and captured by the Persian king Cambyses II, ending the 26th Dynasty and Egypt’s independence.

Amyrtaeus of Sais expelled the Persians and ruled Egypt for six years, founding the 28th Dynasty. Later, Nectanebo I established the 30th Dynasty in 380 BCE with Samannud as its capital. He was succeeded by Teos and Nectanebo II, who struggled to repel successive Persian invasions until the final fall of Egypt to Persia.

=== Medieval Era ===
During the Byzantine period, Lower Egypt was divided into two administrative regions: Augustamnica and Aegyptus. The present-day Gharbia Governorate was part of Aegyptus, with its eastern portion belonging to the third eparchy centered in Shabas ash-Shuhada (ancient Kbasa), and the central and western areas part of the fourth eparchy based in Alexandria. Following the Islamic conquest, Aegyptus was renamed "Batn al-Rif," and its subdivisions became 14 kuras instead of 13 during Roman rule. The area now comprising the governorate fell within the kuras of Samannud, Bana Busir, Damsis, Menouf, Sa, Tuh, Shabas, Sakha, Tayda, and Farajun.

The Fatimids initially divided Lower Egypt into four provinces, including the Gharbia Province, which lay between the Rosetta and Damietta branches of the Nile River and had al-Mahalla as its capital. It was named "Gharbia" due to its location west of the Damietta branch. During the reign of Al-Mustansir Billah, a new administrative system was introduced—major kuras—which included the villages of the current governorate under the jurisdictions of Bani Nasr Island, Quesna Island, Sakha, Samannud, Sanhur, and Tanta kuras.

Under the Ayyubid dynasty, Gharbia’s administrative jurisdiction included the villages of Tamhariya, Sakha, Sanhur, Tanta, Samannud, Quesna Island, Fuwwah, Nastrawiya, and Danjawiya. During the early Mamluk period, Fuwwah and Nastrawiya were separated, followed later by Quesna Island, Danjawiya, and Samannud. Al-Nasir Muhammad later reattached the last three kuras to Gharbia during his Al-Rawk al-Nasiri administrative survey, resulting in a total of 471 villages. The area roughly matched the current governorate, except for the southwestern section, which belonged to Bani Nasr Island and was centered in Ibyar. Gharbia was designated a province in the early Ottoman era in 1527.

=== Modern Era ===
The French campaign in Egypt in 1798 reached Tanta on 7 October, under General Le Febvre, demanding hostages from the town’s notables during the annual celebration of the Mawlid of Ahmad al-Badawi. Governor Salim al-Shurbaji encouraged religious leaders to rally the crowds to resist, which led to a popular uprising and the temporary withdrawal of the French forces. This date is now celebrated as Gharbia's National Day.

The French returned three days later, bombarded the city, arrested shrine servants, and imposed fines totaling over 150,000 French reals. In al-Mahalla, resistance was met with heavy bombardment, resulting in over 600 casualties and large indemnities. Residents of Sanbat also took part in a revolt in Dakahlia.

During the French occupation of Egypt, the term “province” was replaced by “district,” and administrative boundaries were redrawn. The western part of the area was temporarily attached to Monufia, and new districts like Rosetta and Damietta were created at Gharbia’s expense. Samannud briefly became the provincial capital. After the French left, Muhammad Ali Pasha reorganized the country, naming the area “Gharbia Mamuriyya”, then “Mudiriya” (directorate) in 1833.

In 1836, the capital of Gharbia shifted from al-Mahalla al-Kubra to Tanta due to its central location. Gharbia and Monufia were merged several times under the name “Rawdat al-Bahrayn” by Said Pasha (1856), Isma'il Pasha (1866), and again briefly in 1874.

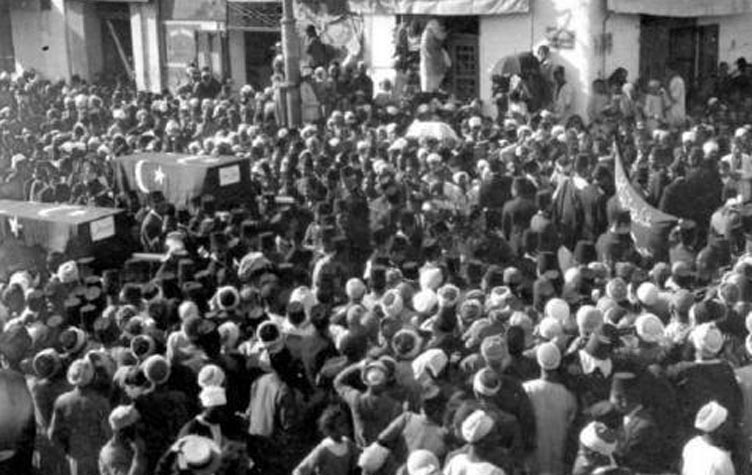
1919 protest of Zefta

During the 1919 Revolution, demonstrations spread across Gharbia: 12 March in Tanta, 15 March in al-Mahalla, 18 March in Samannud. In Zefta, the rebellion escalated into the declaration of the "Republic of Zefta" led by lawyer Yusuf al-Jundi, with public support from neighboring villages. The revolutionaries established a local governing council with committees for supplies, security, hygiene, and media, and issued a daily newspaper, Al-Jumhur. Although British forces intervened, the revolutionaries eluded capture.

In the 1935 protests demanding the return of the 1923 Constitution and British withdrawal in Egypt, demonstrations erupted in Tanta (13, 18 November; 3, 8, 10 December) and strikes followed on 21 November and 19 December. Protests also occurred in al-Mahalla and Zefta.

A 1941 administrative reform committee recommended dividing Gharbia due to its vast size. It proposed transferring Sharbīn, Talkha, and Bilqas to Dakahlia and creating the Fuadiya Directorate from the northern centers of Kafr El Sheikh, Desouk, Fuwwah, Qaleen, Biyala, and the Barullus district. The plan was enacted by Royal Decree No. 149 of 28 August 1949. Further administrative changes occurred between 1943 and 1955, including village reassignments between centers and governorates. In 1960, the term “directorate” was replaced with “governorate,” and some areas were reallocated to Monufia.

== Population ==
In 1960, the governorate numbered 1,815,000 inhabitants. According to population estimates, in 2015 the majority of residents in the governorate lived in rural areas, with an urbanization rate of 25%. Out of an estimated 4,751.865 people residing in the governorate, 3,324,630 people lived in rural areas as opposed to only 1,427,235 in urban areas.

As of recent data, the governorate is home to approximately 1,307,120 households, with an average household size of 3.83 individuals. The birth rate stands at 17.8 live births per 1,000 people, which is below the national average of 21.2. Meanwhile, the death rate is 6.1 per 1,000, slightly higher than the national average of 5.8. This results in a natural population increase rate of 11.7 per 1,000. Official records indicate 9.1 marriage contracts and 2.5 divorce certificates per 1,000 individuals. The average age at first marriage is 30.1 years for males and 24.4 years for females.

=== Religion ===
There are no recent official statistics on the religious composition of the population, as Egyptian censuses have not included such data since 1986. However, as in most parts of Egypt, the majority of the population in the governorate are Sunni Muslims, followed by Orthodox Christians, along with smaller communities of other Islamic and Christian denominations. According to the 1986 census, the religious distribution was as follows: 2,835,472 Muslims (98.29%), 49,085 Christians (1.70%), three Jews, and 38 individuals of other religions. The governorate contains 3,399 mosques under the Ministry of Religious Endowments and 1,418 mosques supervised by the Directorate of Endowments, in addition to 63 churches and monasteries.

Historically, the governorate had a small Jewish community in cities such as Tanta, El Mahalla El Kubra, Zefta, and Kafr El-Zayat, which hosted synagogues and, in the case of Tanta, a school affiliated with the Alliance Israélite Universelle. These cities were centers for Jewish migration in the Nile Delta. The Jewish population contributed to various sectors, including silk weaving, medicine, tax collection, and commerce. In Zefta, they held prominent religious positions in the Delta region. Most of the Jewish population belonged to the Rabbanite sect, with a smaller number of Karaite Jews.

=== Tribes ===
Several Arab tribes settled in the governorate during the Ayyubid period. Prominent among them were the Banu Sinbis from the Tayy tribe, including clans such as the Khaza’ila, who gave their name to the village of Kafr Khaza’il, as well as the Banu Rumaith and Banu ‘Anaz. Allied tribes such as the Banu ‘Adwa from Quda'a also settled in the area. Other groups included the Banu Yazid from Kahlan, the ‘Umariyyun from Banu ‘Adi, as well as segments from Judham, Banu Kinana, Banu Mazid (who lent their name to Tukh Mazid), Banu Wa’il, ‘Azala, and al-Lazz. In addition, tribes from the Kutama and Lawata settled in various parts of the governorate, including groups from the Mazata who lived in El Mahalla and Samannoud and their surroundings.

== Cities ==
- El Mahalla El Kubra
- Kafr El Zayat
- Samanoud
- Tanta
- Zifta
- El Santa
- Kotoor
- Basyoun

== Economy ==
Estimated revenues for Gharbia Governorate in the projected budget plan for the fiscal year 2024 amounted to EGP 28,681,000, while total estimated expenditures reached EGP 26,878,465, resulting in a surplus of EGP 1,802,535. The governorate’s gross domestic product (GDP) stood at EGP 173,762,730.9 in the fiscal year 2020–2021. The total labor force in Gharbia is 1,799,000 individuals, of whom 1,624,900 are employed and 174,100 are unemployed, representing an unemployment rate of 9.7%. Historical sources mention that the revenues of Gharbia during the reign of Sultan Al-Ashraf Sha'ban were recorded as 1,844.47 military dinars.

=== Agriculture ===
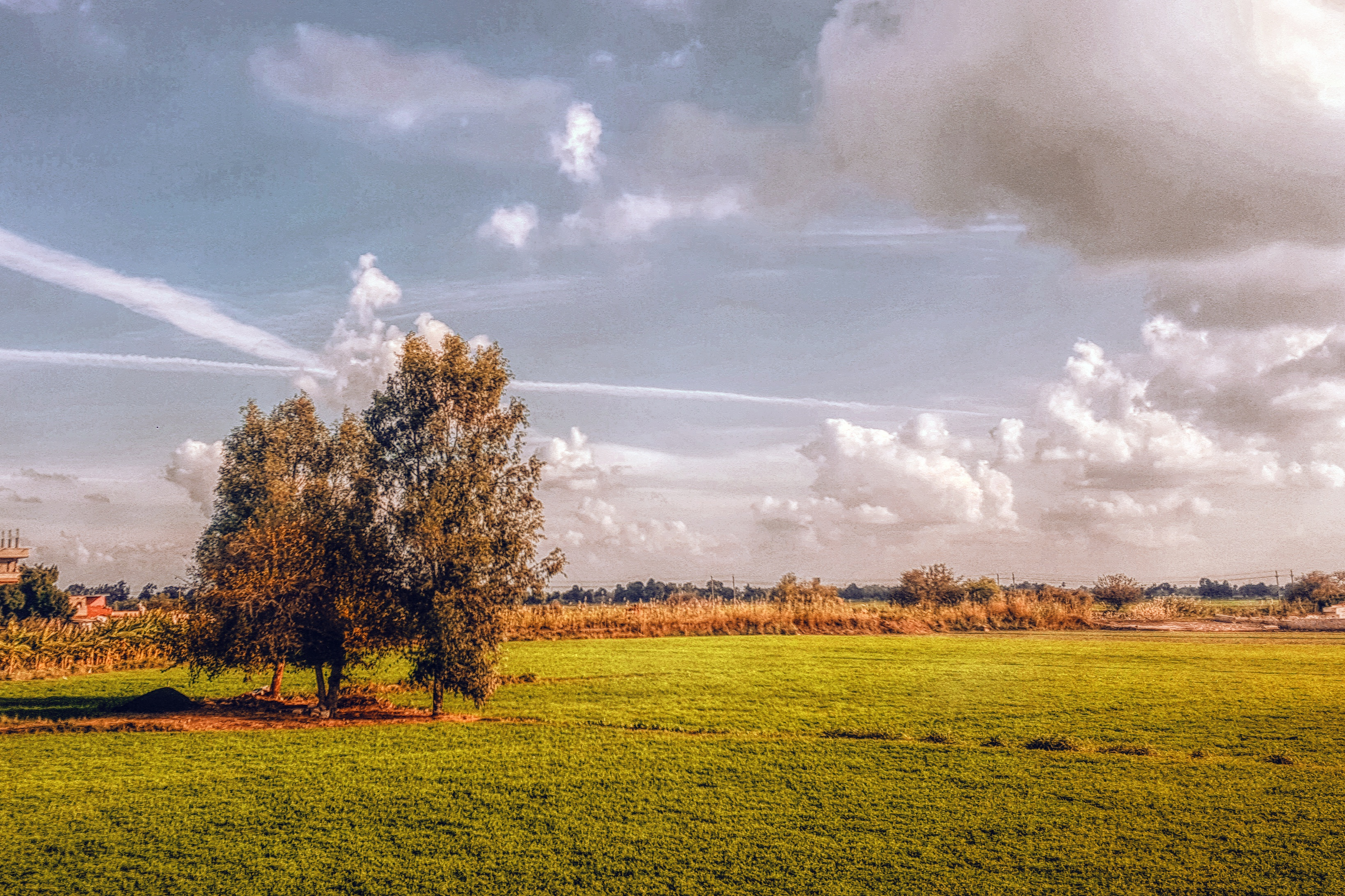
Farm in Al-Farstaq, Gharbia

Agriculture is the most significant economic activity in the governorate. The total cultivated area reached 735,992 feddans in 2021, distributed as follows: 647,163 feddans for crops (producing 5,423,038 tons), 61,744 feddans for vegetables, 26,683 feddans for fruit trees, 376 feddans for date palms, and 26 feddans for timber trees. Other statistics indicate that the planted area was 359.81 thousand feddans, with a total cropped area of 726.36 thousand feddans, compared to 398 thousand feddans in 1996.

In the 2024 harvest season, the governorate's agricultural output included 8,529 feddans of sugar beet, 5,094 feddans of cumin, 34,650 feddans of onions, 259 feddans of garlic, 11,102 feddans of flax, 2,720 feddans of fava beans, 116,566 feddans of wheat, 25,548 feddans of potatoes, 8,469 feddans of vegetables, and 6,998 feddans of maize.

Jasmine cultivation thrives in the village of Shubra Beloula Sakhawiya in Qutour Center, which produces 2,500 tons—accounting for 60% of global jasmine output. Gharbia is the largest onion-producing governorate in Egypt, with an annual production of 920,540 tons. Its key crops include onions, wheat, rice, and maize. The governorate also ranks second nationally in grape production, with 98.73 thousand tons annually. It is home to 11,615 greenhouses producing a total of 42,578 tons of crops.

As of 2021, the governorate had a livestock population of 319,570 heads. The number of poultry stood at 72,872 birds in 2017. Over the past two decades, the composition of livestock has shifted, with an increase in cattle numbers at the expense of buffaloes, goats, sheep, and camels, which have significantly declined. Gharbia hosts 70 animal feed factories and 21 government-run manual slaughterhouses, which produced approximately 13.97 thousand tons of red meat and around 0.32 thousand tons of white meat. The governorate also produces freshwater fish, with a total output of 6.87 thousand tons in 2022. It plans to inaugurate a table egg production facility in the village of Kafr Sheikh Selim.

=== Irrigation ===
Approximately 1.79 billion cubic meters of water are used annually to irrigate the agricultural lands of the governorate. The terrain of the governorate slopes from east to west with an average elevation difference of two meters. Historically, its agricultural lands have been irrigated through canals branching from the Damietta Branch of the Nile, which flows northwest into the Nile Delta and empties into Lake Burullus. In the 19th century, all of these canals began drawing water from the Monufia Canal instead of directly from the Damietta Branch.

To reduce water waste into the Mediterranean Sea, a barrage was constructed near Zefta in 1903. This structure helped increase the supply of water to the Shibin Canal via the Abbas Canal, thereby enhancing water availability for agricultural lands in the northern part of the governorate.

Irrigation in the governorate relies primarily on two sources: the Shibin Canal, which runs parallel to the Damietta Branch, and the Bajouria Canal, which runs along the Rosetta Branch until it reaches the town of Al-Qudaba. Lands situated between the Damietta Branch and the Shibin Canal are irrigated by the Sahil, Atf, and Khadra canals, while those between the Rosetta Branch and the Bajouria Canal are irrigated by the Na’na’iya and Sarsawiya canals. Additionally, several canals such as the Ja’fariya, Qasid, and Mallah irrigate central areas of the governorate.

=== Drainage ===
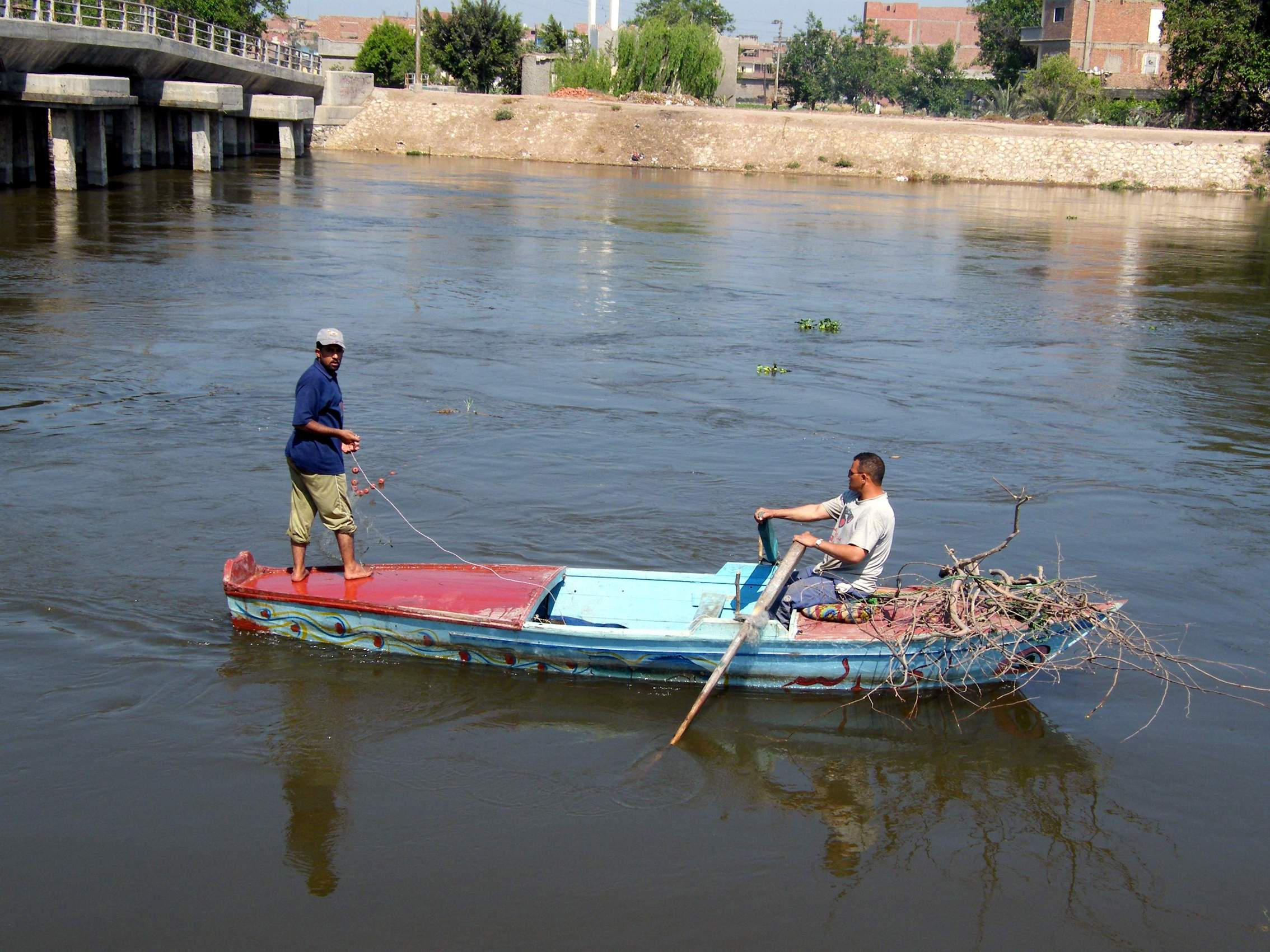
Two fishermen in Shubra Melkan

The governorate has a wide network of drainage systems and pumping stations. Each region is served by a primary drain that collects wastewater from secondary drains. The most significant of these is the Zefta Main Drain, which begins at the Abbas Canal and flows northward, receiving discharge from drains in the area east of the Qasid Canal, such as the Samatay Drain. The southeastern part of the governorate relies on the Atf Drain, which branches off near the confluence of the Atf and Sahil canals and flows into the Zefta Main Drain. The region west of the Qasid Canal and north of Shibin El Kom is drained by two systems: the Denshawai Drain, which starts to the south and discharges into the Rosetta Branch, and the Nashrat Drain, which begins near Kafr El Zayat and flows into Drain No. 9 in Kafr El Sheikh Governorate.

=== Industry ===
Historically, the cities of the governorate were known during the Islamic era for producing textiles such as "al-Basyuni" and "al-Karkha," which were exported to Syria. Today, there are 4,325 registered industrial facilities in the governorate employing over 100,000 workers. These facilities are primarily engaged in the textile and food industries, followed by dyeing, soap and oil production, fertilizers, pesticides, chemicals, paper, perfumes, and furniture manufacturing.

The modern textile industry began with the establishment of the Misr Spinning and Weaving Company in El Mahalla El Kubra in 1927 by Talaat Harb and Abdel Hai Khalil. The company produces 15 tons of fine yarn and 20 tons of coarse yarn daily. It has a branch in Samannoud known as the Samanoud Weaving and Terry Company. Another notable factory is the Tanta Linen Company, also located in the governorate.

The largest sector within the food processing industry is oil production, accounting for about one-fifth of the sector and producing around 23,300 tons of oil. White cheese production follows, contributing another fifth with 4,000 tons, then pickles (12%) with 4,700 tons, halva (12%) with 10,400 tons, and other products like smoked fish, pasta, dried fruits, and yogurt. Kafr El Zayat is home to the pesticide industry, with companies such as the Egyptian Salt and Soda Company (1899), the Egyptian Financial and Industrial Company (1929), and Kafr El Zayat Pesticides and Chemicals Company (1957).

Flax is cultivated in the village of Shabramant, where 29 factories process it for export. In 2022, an industrial zone for furniture production was established in the village of Kutama Al-Ghaba, which now hosts 504 workshops employing 2,424 workers and includes 220 furniture showrooms. The village of Al-Farsatak is home to around 200 pottery and ceramics workshops, making it the governorate’s largest producer in this craft. There are also many small-scale factories in the villages of Qarnshu and Tag Al-Ajam for producing charcoal, clay bricks in the centers of Zefta and Kafr El Zayat, and tire recycling in the villages of Mit Al-Harun and Kafr Mit Al-Harun. However, due to the rudimentary nature of these industries and the limited support they receive, they often harm workers and pollute the environment, negatively affecting agricultural productivity in these areas.

=== Tourism ===
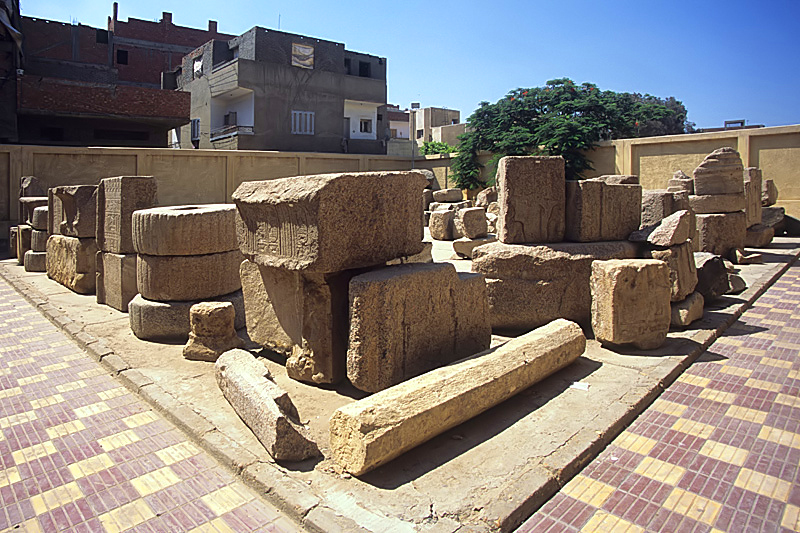
Stones of the Temple of Samanud

The governorate offers a mix of recreational, religious, and archaeological tourism. There are four main Ancient Egyptian archaeological sites: Sa El-Hagar, which was once the capital of the Fifth Nome of Lower Egypt and later the capital during the 24th and 26th dynasties; the ruins of a Ptolemaic temple at Bahbit El-Hagar in Samannoud; Abu Sir, where a statue of Psamtik I and other artifacts were discovered; and the Temple of Samannoud, located behind the city’s central hospital, which features granite blocks inscribed with 30th dynasty and Ptolemaic engravings. Additional finds including inscribed stones, coins, pottery, and temple remains have been discovered in Tell Aba Yazid and the villages of Nimra El Basal, Beltag, Ibyar, and Al-Nahariya.

=== Religious Sites ===
Among the Coptic sites, the most prominent is the Church of Saint Abanoub in Samannoud, considered by Christian tradition to be the fifth stop of the Holy Family during their flight into Egypt. They are believed to have stayed there for two weeks. Other notable churches include the Church of Saint Rafka in Sanbat (one of the oldest in the governorate), the Church of the Virgin Mary and the Church of Saint George in Ibyar, and Coptic churches in Tanta and El Mahalla El Kubra.

The governorate is also known for its Islamic heritage sites, most famously the Ahmad al-Badawi Mosque in Tanta, which hosts a major moulid in October attracting between one and three million visitors. Other important Islamic sites include historical mosques, fountains, and public baths in Tanta, El Mahalla, and Samannoud. Notable examples are the Bourse Mosque (Mohamed El-Bahi) in Tanta, said to have been founded during the Rashidun Caliphate; the Amri Mosque, Al-Mutawalli Mosque, and the Ghoury Agency in El Mahalla; the Jewish alcove established by Rabbi Haim Al-Amshati in 1044; and the public bath in Samannoud, built in 1748 and preserved in its original form since then.

== Environmental projects and programs ==
In 2016, Switzerland committed to funding a solid waste management program in Gharbia, a project with the Egyptian Ministry of Environment that was set to conclude in 2021. The National Solid Waste Management Programme (NSWMP) involves the construction of infrastructure for new, as well as the expansion and improvement of existing waste treatment, landfill, and recycling facilities.

== Infrastructure ==
=== Road and Highway Transport ===
The road network in Gharbia Governorate is considered one of the key components of the infrastructure in the Nile Delta. The governorate plays a central role in connecting Cairo with the northern coasts and the Suez Canal cities. As of 2021, the total length of the road network in Gharbia reached approximately 4,743 kilometers, including 3,491 kilometers of paved roads and 1,252 kilometers of unpaved roads.

Key routes include the Tanta–El-Santa–Zefta road, which has seen the completion of its first phase, spanning 11 kilometers at a cost of approximately EGP 882 million. This project aims to improve traffic flow and enhance connectivity between the towns it serves. Another significant project is the Na'naiya axis in Kafr El-Zayat, designed to ease traffic congestion and link industrial areas to the main highways. The development involves the covering of drainage canals, the construction of sidewalks, and the installation of street lighting.

Gharbia Governorate is also witnessing the implementation of several road development projects. These include the dualization of the Tofeikeya–Khattaba road at a cost of EGP 165 million, the addition of a third lane to the agricultural road from Kafr El-Dawwar to Kafr El-Zayat at a cost of EGP 396 million, and the expansion and upgrading of the Cairo–Alexandria agricultural road from Tanta to Kafr El-Zayat at a cost of EGP 280 million. Additionally, six future road projects are planned within the governorate, totaling 56 kilometers in length and estimated to cost EGP 484 million.

Additional road improvements include the Al-Sheen–Qutour road, aimed at providing safer and more efficient transportation. These projects are overseen by the General Authority for Roads and Bridges through its regional branch in Gharbia, in coordination with other relevant entities.

=== Rail Transport ===
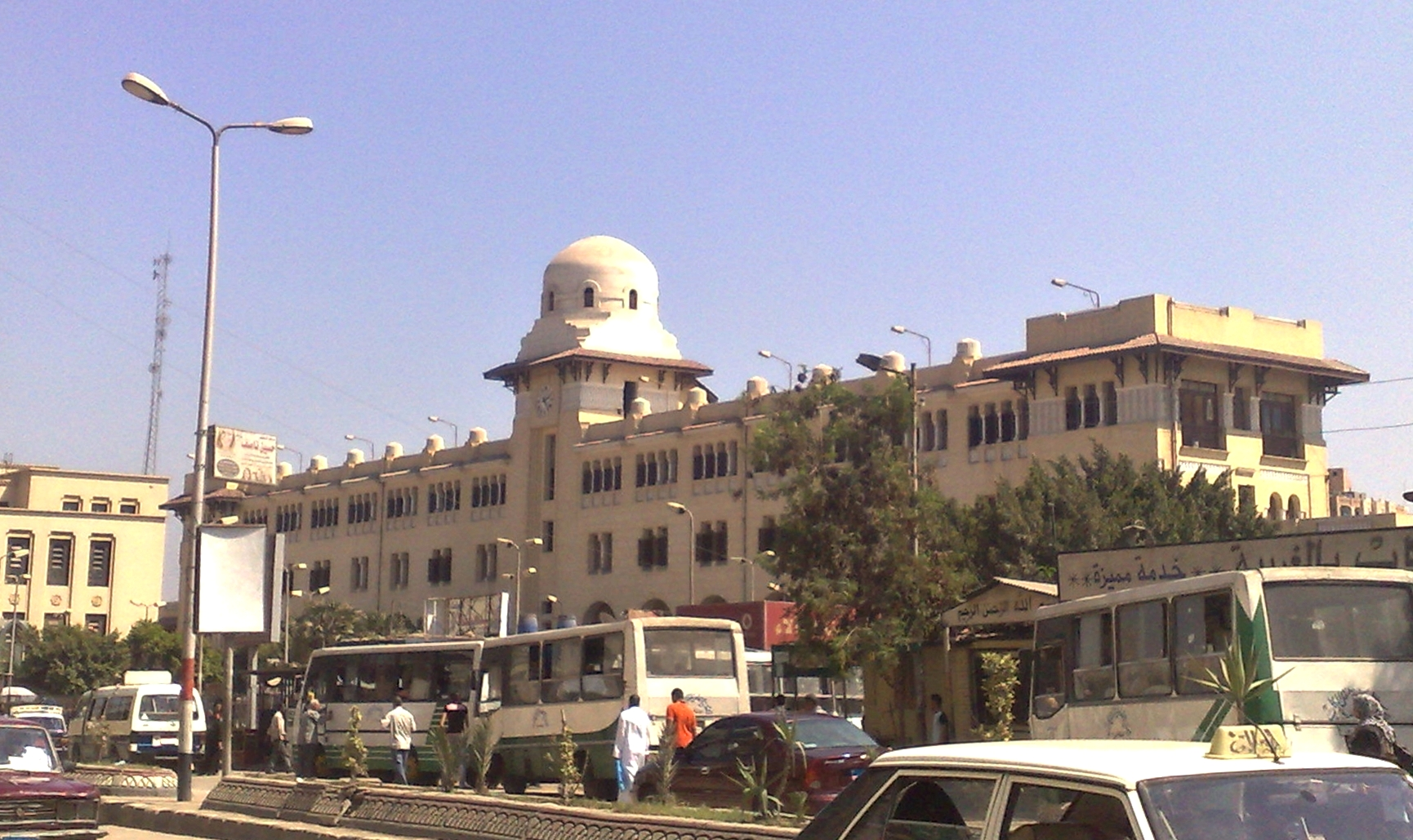
Tanta Railway Station

Gharbia is a significant hub within Egypt’s railway network. It lies on major railway lines connecting Cairo and Alexandria, in addition to secondary lines linking it to cities such as Zagazig, Mansoura, and Damanhur.

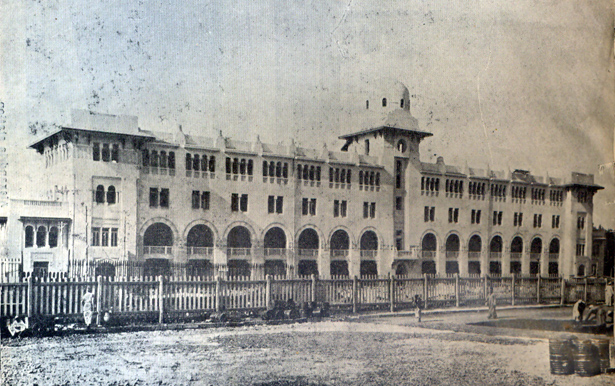
Older photograph

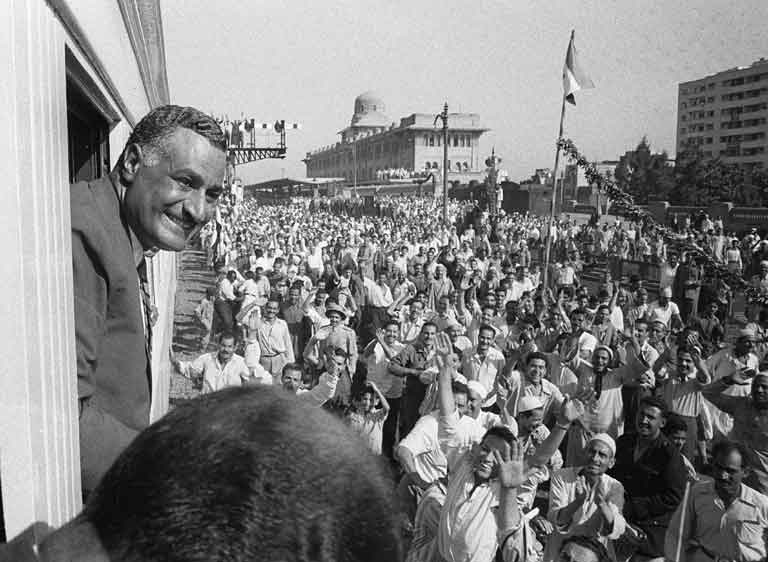
Nasser’s farewell to the people in Tanta Railway Station, August 8, 1959

Tanta serves as a central hub within Gharbia’s railway network, hosting one of the major interchange stations in Gharbia and the Delta region. The rail services in Gharbia are used for both passenger and freight transport and include express and local trains. Although the infrastructure is relatively old, certain sections have undergone limited upgrades in recent years, including station renovations, rolling stock updates, and signal system improvements, as part of broader government efforts to modernize public transportation.

The railway system occasionally faces challenges such as high population density, congested lines, and delays, along with a need for more comprehensive infrastructure development. Nevertheless, rail transport remains a vital mode of travel for residents of the governorate, particularly for commuting between its major cities and to other parts of the country.

The country’s first railway line began operation between Cairo and Kafr El-Zayat in 1854, and the full Cairo–Alexandria railway was completed in 1856. Several railway stations in the governorate are undergoing upgrades, including Tanta Station (67% completion) and Mahallet Rouh Station (45% completion).

=== Vehicles ===
As of 2022, the governorate had a total of 514,184 registered vehicles. It also has 183 bridges managed by the General Authority for Roads and Bridges, 189 by local municipalities, and 2,097 by the Ministry of Water Resources and Irrigation over canals and waterways.

=== Air and Water Transport ===
The governorate has no airports; the nearest are Cairo International Airport and Borg El Arab Airport in Alexandria. It also lacks river ports.

== Culture ==
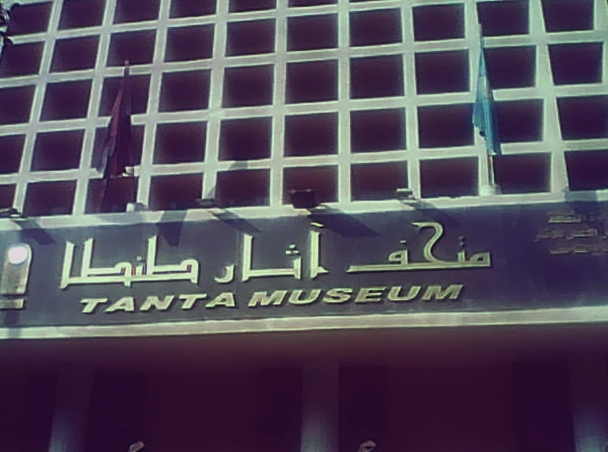
Tanta Museum

The Directorate of Culture in Gharbia Governorate contributes to promoting cultural awareness through a diverse network of institutions, including 12 cultural palaces and houses (as of 2021), 49 public libraries, and libraries attached to cultural centers, institutes, and faculties. The total number of reading halls is 83, with a combined collection of approximately 440,000 books.

The governorate's only museum is the Tanta Museum, which was originally opened in 1913. It houses artifacts resulting from archaeological excavations conducted in sites across the governorate, in addition to pieces from other governorates and museums to enrich the collection. The museum consists of five floors: the first floor is dedicated to Islamic antiquities, the second to manuscripts, the third to artifacts from the Greco-Roman world and Coptic heritage, the fourth to Ancient Egyptian artifacts, and the fifth floor contains administrative offices.

Among the most prominent cultural institutions in the governorate is the Tanta Library (Dar al-Kutub), which is over a hundred years old and contains around 30,000 books and volumes across various fields. Another significant institution is the Ahmadi Mosque Library, established in 1898 during the reign of Abbas II of Egypt, based on the collections of scholars at the mosque of Ahmad al-Badawi. In 1955, the library reportedly held 10,200 books and 11,700 volumes.

== Healthcare ==
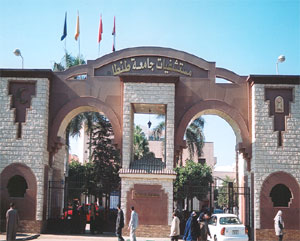
Tanta University Hospital

The healthcare sector in Gharbia generally performs better than the national average in Egypt, with the exception of child mortality rates. The total number of hospital beds in the governorate is 6,999, two-thirds of which are in public hospitals, while the remaining third are in the private sector. These hospitals employ 10,605 medical doctors and 15,828 nurses. Additionally, there are 3,358 practicing dentists and 8,362 pharmacists in the governorate.

As of 2022, there were 5,045 registered pharmacies in the governorate, only eleven of which offered overnight services. Child mortality rates in Gharbia are recorded at 13.4 per 1,000 live births for neonates, 21.1 per 1,000 for infants under one year, and 24.9 per 1,000 for children under the age of five.

== Education ==
The illiteracy rate in the governorate reached 14.41% in 2023/24, amounting to approximately 29.70 thousand individuals. According to the 2017 census data, out of the total population of the governorate over the age of ten (3,842,713 people), there were 822,781 illiterate individuals. Additionally, 385,548 people had completed only primary education, 239,846 held a secondary school certificate, and 995,323 had received intermediate technical education, which represented the largest educational group in the governorate. Meanwhile, 521,508 individuals held a university degree. A significant proportion of the population had dropped out of education for over four years, with 352,742 people having enrolled and later dropped out, and 1,008,261 never enrolling in school. The governorate ranked first nationally in the Decent Life initiative due to its efforts in eradicating illiteracy, with 220,000 individuals becoming literate over the three years preceding 2024.

=== Pre-university education ===
The governorate contains 2,457 schools and 810 Al-Azhar institutes. The number of students enrolled in public schools is approximately 1,084,840, while Al-Azhar institutes serve around 188,990 students. There are 196 technical schools in the 2023/24 academic year, the majority of which are industrial or commercial, with a smaller number being hotel or agricultural schools. These schools collectively educate around 107,390 students annually.

The governorate suffers from classroom overcrowding beyond the targets set by the Ministry of Education, which aims for a maximum average of 40 students per class. The average class size in primary schools is 50 students, in preparatory schools 45.7 students, and in secondary schools 39.2 students per class, although the target is 36. There are shortages in the number of schools across all educational levels.

=== Higher education ===
The only public university in the governorate is Tanta University, which began as a branch of Alexandria University in 1962. It became an independent institution under the name University of Middle Delta in 1972, and was renamed Tanta University in 1973. The number of faculties has increased over time, and the university currently comprises 16 faculties: Medicine, Science, Education, Commerce, Pharmacy, Dentistry, Arts, Law, Nursing, Engineering, Agriculture, Physical Education, Specific Education, Computers and Information, Applied Arts, and a Technical Nursing Institute.

There are three faculties affiliated with Al-Azhar University: the Faculty of Fundamentals of Religion and Preaching, established in 1976; the Faculty of Sharia and Law, founded in 1978; and the Faculty of the Holy Quran for Readings and its Sciences, established on 30 September 1991. The total number of students enrolled in these institutions is approximately 9,300. Higher education in the rest of the governorate is limited to institutes, with the exception of Gharbia Technological University in Samannoud, established in 2021, and the Technological College in El-Mahalla El-Kubra.

In September 2020, Tanta University announced its approval to establish Tanta National University at the Sibrbay campus. The Ministry of Higher Education and Scientific Research later approved the establishment in 2025. The planned university is expected to include ten faculties: Medicine, Dentistry, Pharmacy, Nursing, Engineering, Computers and Artificial Intelligence, Science, Financial and Administrative Sciences, Social and Human Sciences, and Al-Alsun.

== Notable people ==
- Mohamed Salah (Liverpool F.C. footballer)
- Mohammed Elneny (Former Arsenal F.C footballer and current Al Jazira F.C player)
- Alaa Aladdin Mumohamed Elghobashy (Imam)

== See also ==
- List of cities and towns in Egypt
