= List of Coptic place names =

This is a list of traditional Coptic place names. This list includes:

- Places involved in the history of Egypt and the Coptic Christianity and the Coptic names given to them.
- Places whose names originate from the Coptic language.
- Places whose names were derived from the Coptic language by scholars.

== Egypt ==
=== Cairo Governorate ===
Cities, towns, villages and neighbourhoods
English name	Coptic name		Transliteration and pronunciation		Etymology	Arabic name	Ancient Greek name
English name	Bohairic	Other dialects	Classical Bohairic	Late Bohairic	Etymology	Arabic name	Ancient Greek name
Cairo	ϯⲕⲉϣⲣⲱⲙⲓ		ti-Kešrōmi: [ti.kəʃˈɾoːmi]	di-Kešrōmi: [di.kəʃˈɾoːmi]	From Arabic: القصر الروم, romanized: al-Qasr ar-Rum	القاهرة	
Helwan	ϩⲁⲗⲃⲁⲛ, ϩⲁⲗⲟⲩⲁⲛ		Halban, Halouan: [ˈhɑlβɑn], [ˈhɑlwɑn]	Halwan: [ˈhɑlwɑn]	possibly Semitic in the origin, compare Hebrew: חול, romanized: khol, lit. 'sand' and Old Testament place name Holon.	حلوان	
Ayn Shams (Heliopolis)	ⲱⲛ ⲡⲉⲧⲫⲣⲏ		Ōn Petphrē: [oːn pətpʰˈɾeːʔ]	Ōn Badabra: [oːn bəˌdəbˈɾeːʔ]	from Ancient Egyptian: Jwnw	عين شمس	Ἡλιούπολις
Tura	ⲧⲣⲱⲁ		Trōa: [ˈtroː(w)ɑ]	Drōa: [ˈdroː(w)ɑ]		طرة	Τρωη
Minyat as-Sirgi	ϯⲙⲟⲛⲁⲭⲁ ⲙ̀ⲡⲓⲥⲓⲥⲙⲉⲗⲱⲛ		ti-Monakha m-Pisismelōn: [ti.ˈmɔnakʰə mpəsəsmɛloːn]	di-Monaka em-Bisismelōn: [di.ˈmonakə əmbəsəsmɛloːn]	the abode of sesame oil	منيه السيرج	
El-Hamra	ϩⲁⲗⲁⲙⲃⲣⲉⲟⲩⲁⲧ		Halambreouat: [hɑlɑmˈβrɛwɑt]	Halambraouad: [hɑlɑmˈbrawɑd]		الحمراء	
Abbasia	ϣⲁⲧⲥ/ⲡⲥⲟⲃⲧ ⲙ̀ⲡϩⲟⲓ		Šats/p-Sobt m-p-Hoi: [ˈʃats]/[ˈpsɔβt əmˈphɔj]	Šats/eb-Sobt em-be-Hoi: [ˈʃats]/[əbˈsobd əmbəˈhoj]	the moat/the wall of the moat	العباسية	
Al-Azbakeya	ϯⲁⲛⲧⲱⲛⲓⲁⲥ		ti-Antōnias: [ti.ənˈtoːnjas]	di-Andōnias: [di.ənˈdoːnjas]	related to a personal name Anthony	أزبكية	
al-Askar	ⲛⲓⲥⲧⲣⲁⲙ		Nistram: [niˈstram]	Nisdram: [niˈzdram]	from Ancient Greek: στράτευμα, lit. 'army, host'	العسكر	
El-Maasara	ϣⲁϩⲣⲉⲛ		Šahren: [ʃahˈrɛn]	Šahran: [ʃahˈran]	related to Arabic: شَحْر, lit. 'inner part of a valley'	المعصرة	
Bulaq	*ⲫⲩⲗⲁⲕⲏ		*Philake: [pʰilaˈkæ]	*Bilake: [bilaˈkæ]	from Ancient Greek: φυλακή, lit. 'a guard, garrison'	بولاق	
Al-Darb Al-Ahmar	ⲫⲙⲁⲛⲑⲱⲟⲩϯ ⲛ̀ⲛⲓⲧⲉⲭⲛⲓⲧⲏⲥ		eph-Mantōwti en-Nitekhnitēs: [əpʰmanˈtoːwtə ənnitəkʰnitˈæs]	eb-Mandōwdi en-Nidaknidās: [əbmanˈdoːwdə ənnidəknidˈæs]	the artisans' gathering place	الدرب الأحمر	
Cairo Citadel	ⲧⲭⲁⲗⲁ		t-Khala: [ˈtkʰala]	ed-Kala: [ədˈkala]	from Arabic: قلعة, lit. 'fortress, castle'	قلعة صلاح الدين	
al-Ghuria	ϯⲣⲁⲃⲏ ⲛ̀ⲣⲱⲙⲉⲟⲥ		ti-Rabē en-Rōmeos: [ti.raˈβæ ənˈroːmɛɔs]	di-Rawē en-Rōmeos: [di.raˈwæ ənˈroːmɛos]	the Roman quarter	الغورية	
Manshiyat Naser	ⲡⲙⲁⲛϫⲓⲛⲑⲱⲟⲩϯ ⲛ̀ⲛⲓⲭⲣⲓⲥⲧⲓⲁⲛⲟⲥ		p-Mančinthōwti en-ni-Khristianos: [əpʰmant͡ʃinˈtoːwtə ənnəkʰriˈstjanɔs]	eb-Mančindōwdi en-ni-Krisdianos: [əbmand͡ʒinˈdoːwdə ənnəkriˈsdjanos]	district of the Christians	منشية ناصر	

=== Giza Governorate ===
English name	Coptic name		Transliteration and pronunciation		Etymology	Arabic name	Ancient Greek name
English name	Bohairic	Other dialects	Classical Bohairic	Late Bohairic	Etymology	Arabic name	Ancient Greek name
Giza	ϯⲡⲉⲣⲥⲓⲟⲓ, ϯⲡⲉⲣⲥⲓⲟⲥ, ϯⲡⲉⲣⲥⲓⲱϯ	Sahidic: ⲧⲡⲉⲣⲥⲓⲥ	ti-Persioi: [tə.pəɾsiˈɔj]; ti-Persios: [tə.pəɾsiˈɔs]; ti-Persiōti: [tə.pəɾsiˈoːtə]	di-Barsioi: [də.bəɾsiˈoj]; di-Barsios: [də.bəɾsiˈos]; di-Barsiōdi: [də.bəɾsiˈoːdə]	"the Persian (fortress)" most likely referring to a Sasanian stronghold found in the area in the early 7th century	الجيزة	
Atfih	ⲡⲉⲧⲡⲉϩ	Sahidic: ⲡⲉⲧⲡⲏϩ, ⲧⲡⲏϩ	Petpeh: [pətˈpɛh]	Bedbah: [bədˈbah]	from Ancient Egyptian: Tp-ı͗ḥw, lit. 'head of (the) cows'	أطفيح	Ἀφροδίτης πόλις
Ausim	ⲃⲟⲩϣⲏⲙ		Boušēm: [βuˈʃæm]	Woušēm: [wuˈʃæm]	from Ancient Egyptian: pr-ḫm, lit. 'house of sanctuary'	اوسيم	Λητοῦς πόλις
Abu Sir	*ⲡⲟⲩⲥⲓⲣⲓ	Sahidic: ⲡⲟⲩⲥⲓⲣⲉ	*Pousiri: [puˈsirə]	*Bousiri: [buˈsirə]	from Ancient Egyptian: Pr-Wsı͗r, lit. 'house of Osiris'	ابو صير	Βουσιρις
Umm Khnan	ⲙⲟⲭⲛⲟⲛ, ⲙⲟϧⲛⲟⲛ		Moḥnon: [mɔxnˈɔn]	Moḥnon: [moxnˈon]	from Ancient Greek: μοναχών, lit. '(place) of monks'	ام خنان	
Abu an-Nimras	ⲡⲟⲛⲙⲟⲛⲣⲟⲥ		Ponmonros: [pɔnmɔnrˈɔs]	Bonmonros: [bonmonrˈos]	from Coptic: ⲡ+, lit. 'definite masculine article' and Ancient Greek: Ἄνω μερίς, lit. 'upper district'	أبو النمرس	Ἄνω μερίς
Tirsa	ⲧⲉⲣⲥⲱ		Tersō: [tərˈsoː]	Dersō: [dərˈsoː]	from Ancient Egyptian: tꜣ-rsy.t, lit. 'the watch'	ترسا	
Tamwa	ⲧⲁⲙⲙⲱⲟⲩ		Tammōw: [tɑmˈmoːw]	Dammōw: [dɑmˈmoːw]	settlement of water	طموة	
Shubramant	*ϫⲉⲃⲣⲟ ⲉⲙⲉⲛⲧ		*Čebro Ement: [kʲəβˈro əmˈɛnt]	*Čebro Emand: [d͡ʒəbˈro əmˈand]	eastern hamlet	شبىرا منت	

=== Beheira Governorate ===
English name	Coptic name		Transliteration and pronunciation		Etymology	Arabic name	Ancient Greek name
English name	Bohairic	Other dialects	Classical Bohairic	Late Bohairic	Etymology	Arabic name	Ancient Greek name
Damanhur	ⲡⲧⲓⲙⲉⲛϩⲱⲣ (ⲗⲩⲙⲛⲏ), ⲡⲓϯⲙⲓⲛϩⲱⲣ	Sahidic: ⲡⲧⲓⲙⲉⲛϩⲟⲩⲣ	p-Timenhōr: [ptəmənˈhoːr] (Lymnē): [ˈlɪmni]	eb-Dimenhōr: [əbdəmənˈhoːr] (Lymnē): [ˈlɪmni]	from Ancient Egyptian: Dmỉ-n-Ḥr.w, lit. 'village of Horus', the suffix ⲗⲩⲙⲛⲏ, coming from Ancient Greek: λίμνη, lit. 'lake' (i.e. Lake Province – Beheira) is added sometimes to distinguish it from other toponyms of the same name.	دمنهور	Ἑρμοῦ πόλις Μικρά
Rosetta	ϯⲣⲁϣⲓⲧ	Sahidic: ⲣⲁϣⲓⲧⲧⲉ	ti-Rašit: [tə.rəʃˈit]	di-Rašid: [də.rəʃˈid]	from Arabic: رشيد, lit. 'guide'	رشيد	Βολβιτίνη
Desouk	*ⲧⲉⲥⲟⲩⲭⲓ		*Tesoukhi: [təˈsukʰə]	*Desouki: [dəˈsukə]	from Ancient Egyptian: tꜣ-sbk, lit. 'land of Sobek'	دسوق	
El Mahmoudiah	ⲡⲉⲗϩⲓⲡ		Pelhip: [pəlˈhɪp]	Belhib: [bəlˈhɪb]		المحمودية	
Shubrakhit	*ϯϫⲉⲫⲣⲟ ϧⲏⲧ		*ti-Čephro Ḥēt: [kʲəpʰˈrɔ xæt]	*di-Čebro Ḥēd: [d͡ʒəbˈro xæd]	northern hamlet	شبراخيت	
Wadi Natrun	ϣⲓϩⲏⲧ		Šihēt: [ʃiˈhæt]	Šihēt: [ʃiˈhæt]	measure of the heart	وادي النطرون	Σκήτις

=== Sharqia Governorate ===
English name	Coptic name		Transliteration and pronunciation		Etymology	Arabic name	Ancient Greek name
English name	Bohairic	Other dialects	Classical Bohairic	Late Bohairic	Etymology	Arabic name	Ancient Greek name
Bilbeis	ⲫⲉⲗⲃⲏⲥ, ⲫⲗⲉⲃⲉⲥ		Phelbēs: [pʰəlˈβes] Phlebes: [pʰlɛˈβɛs]	Belbēs: [bəlˈbæs] Blebes: [blɛˈbɛs]	Probably related to Bes (Coptic: ⲃⲏⲥ)	بلبيس	*Βύβλος
Saft el-Hinna	ϯⲁⲣⲁⲃⲓⲁ		ti-Arabia: [tə.araˈβia]	di-Arabia: [də.araˈbia]	"the Arabia"	صفط الحنة	
San el-Hagar	ϫⲁⲛⲏ	Sahidic: ϫⲁⲁⲛⲉ (Čaane: [ˈt͡ʃaːnə]); Fayyumic: ϫⲉⲉⲛⲓ	Čanē: [t͡ɕane]	Čanē: [ˈɟani]		صان الحجر	Τάνις
Abu Hammad	*ⲡⲁⲛⲟⲩⲡ		*Panoup: [paˈnup]	*Banoub: [baˈnub]	The former name of the city is Banoub, "(place) of Anoub (personal name)"	أبو حماد	
Hurbayt	ⲫⲁⲣⲃⲁⲓⲧ		Pharbait: [pʰərˈβajt]	Barbait: [bərˈbajt]	From Ancient Egyptian: pr-ḥrw-mr.ty, lit. 'house of the two eyed Horus'	هربيطة	Φάρβαιθος
Bahtit	ⲫⲁϩⲧⲓⲧ		Phahtit: [pʰahˈtit]	Bahtit: [bahˈtit]		بحطيط	
Al-Adliyya	ⲡⲉⲥⲏⲣⲡ		Pesērp: [pəˈsærp]	Bezarb: [bəˈzærb]		العدلية	
Ash-Shabanat	ϣⲃⲉⲛϯ		Šbenti: [ˈʃβɛnti]	Šbandi: [ʃəˈbandi]		الشبانات	
El Husseiniya	ⲃⲟⲩⲧⲱ		Boutō: [βuˈtoː]	Woudō: [wuˈdoː]		الحسينية	Βουτω
Ibrash	*ⲫⲣⲏϣ		*Phrēš: [pʰˈræʃ]	*Braš: [əbˈræʃ]	"mat, coverlet"	إبراش	
Al-Tahira	*ⲧⲁϩⲗⲏ		*Tahlē: [tahˈlæ]	*Tahlē: [tahˈlæ]	Based on the former hame of the town – Tāhlā	الطاهرة	Τααλη
Al Qatawyah	*ϣⲏⲙ ⲛϯⲙⲓ		*Šēm en-Timi: [ˈʃæm əntəˈmi]	*Šēm en-Dimi: [ˈʃæm əndəˈmi]	The former name of the village is Shamandima, from Coptic "small town"	القطاوية	

=== Kafr el-Sheikh Governorate ===
English name	Coptic name		Transliteration and pronunciation		Etymology	Arabic name	Ancient Greek name
English name	Bohairic	Other dialects	Classical Bohairic	Late Bohairic	Etymology	Arabic name	Ancient Greek name
Kafr El Sheikh	*ⲑⲙⲟⲩⲓⲛⲓⲕⲱⲛ		*Thmouinikōn: [tʰmujniˈkoːn]	*Demouinikōn: [dəmujniˈkoːn]	Reconstructed based on the old Arabic name of the city (Arabic: دمينقون, romanized: Dumaynaqūn), from ⲑⲙⲟⲩⲓ (island) + ⲛⲓⲕⲱⲛ (personal name, although unattested in Coptic sources)	كفر الشيخ	
Burj al- Burullus/Tell al-Hadadin	ⲧⲡⲁⲣϩⲁⲗⲓⲟⲥ		t-Pahralios: [təpərhaliˈɔs]	de-Barhalios: [dəbərhaliˈos]	From Ancient Greek: παραλίᾱ, lit. 'seaside'	برج البرلس	Παραλέος
Fuwwah	ⲃⲟⲩⲁ		Boua: [βuˈwa]	Boua: [wuˈwa]		فوة	Παυα
Metoubes	*ⲛⲓⲧⲟⲡⲟⲥ		*Nitopos: [nəˈtɔpɔs]	*Nitobos: [nəˈtobos]	Supposedly from Coptic: ⲛⲓ+, lit. 'definite plural article' + Coptic: ⲧⲟⲡⲟⲥ, lit. 'plot of land'	مطوبس	
Qallin	ⲕⲁⲗⲗⲓⲛ		Kallin: [kalˈlin]	Kallin: [kalˈlin]	Supposedly from a personal name Kalleinos (Ancient Greek: Καλλινος)	قلين	
Desouk	*ⲧⲉⲥⲟⲩⲭⲓ		*Tesoukhi: [təˈsukʰə]	*Desouki: [dəˈsukə]	From Ancient Egyptian: tꜣ-sbk, lit. 'land of Sobek'	دسوق	
Shabas	ϫⲁⲡⲁⲥⲉⲛ		Čapasen: [t͡ʃəˈpasən]	Čabasen: [d͡ʒəˈbasən]		شباس	Καβασα
Sakha	ⲥϧⲱⲟⲩ		Sḥōw: [sxˈoːw]	Sḥōw: [sxˈoːw]		سخا	Ξόις
Shamshirah	*ϫⲉⲃⲣⲟ ⲡϣⲏⲣⲓ		*Čephro p-Šēri: [t͡ʃəβʼrɔ 'pʃeːrə]	*Čebro eb-Šēri: [ʃəbˈro əb'ʃarə]		شمشيرة	
Sandyun	ⲡⲥⲉⲛⲧⲓⲟⲛ ⲛⲧⲉ ⲛⲓⲁⲙⲣⲏⲩ		p-Sention ente Niamrēy: [psənti'ɔːn 'əntɛ nəam'rej]	eb-Sendion ende Niamrēy: [əbsəndi'oːn 'ənda nəam'rej]	"Sention of the bakers"	سنديون	
Qabrit	ⲕⲟⲡⲣⲏⲧ		Koprēt: [kɔpˈret]	Kobrēt: [kobˈræt]		قبريط	Κοπριθεως κωμη
Matbul	*ⲡⲁⲧⲃⲱⲛ		*Patbōn: [patˈβoːn]	*Batbōn: [badˈwoːn]		متبول	
Sidi Salem/Kom al-Khawaled	ⲫⲉⲣⲟⲩⲱⲓⲛⲓ, ⲡⲗⲁⲩⲥⲓⲛⲉ		Pherwōini: [pʰərˈwoːjni], Plawsine: [plawˈsinə]	Berwōini: [bərˈwoːjni] Blawsina: [əblawˈsinə]		سيدي سالم	Φραγωνις, Φλαβωνιας
Sidi Ghazy	ⲡⲓϣⲁⲣⲱⲧ		Pišarōt: [pəʃaˈroːt]	Bišarot: [bəʃaˈroːt]	The former name of the town is Shubrā Ankalusā (Arabic: شبرا انكلسا). The ancient city of Bashrud is thought to be in Sidi Ghazy (Kom el-Ahmar).	سيدي غازي	Ἐλεαρχία
Al-Haddadi/ Nastarawa	ⲛⲓϣⲧⲉⲣⲱⲟⲩ		Ništerōw: [nəʃtəˈroːw]	Ništarōw: [nəʃtɑˈroːw]	From Ancient Egyptian: nht-bꜣst.t-rw, lit. 'strong is Bast against them'	الحداحي	Νιστερῶς
Al-Hanafi al-Kubra/ Ajnu	ⲡⲓϣⲓⲛⲓⲏⲟⲩ		Pišiniēw: [pəʃiˈnjew]	Bišiniēw: [bəʃiˈnjæw]		الحنفي الكبرى (اجنو)	Ἀγνοῦ
Izbat al-Kom al-Kabir/ Danatu	ⲡⲧⲉⲛⲉⲧⲱ		Ptenetō: [ptənɛˈto]	Ebdenetō: [əbdənəˈto]	From Ancient Egyptian: pꜣ-tꜣ-n-wꜣḏy.t, lit. 'the land of Wadjet'	عزبة الكوم الكبير	Φθενετος
Baltim	ⲡⲓⲛⲉⲡϯⲙⲓ		Pineptimi: [pənəpˈtimə]	Binebtimi: [bənəbˈdimə]		بلطيم	Πινεπτιμι
Niqiza/Kom Nuqaizah	ⲛⲓⲕⲉϫⲱⲟⲩ		Nikečōw: [nəkɛˈt͡ɕow]	Nikečōw: [nəkɛˈɟow]		نقيزة	Νικετου
Duqmira	*ⲕⲱⲙⲏ ⲧⲓⲭⲟⲙⲏⲣⲓⲟⲛ		*Kōmē Tikhomērion: [ˈkomə təkʰɔˈmeriɔn]	*Kōmē Dikomerion: [ˈkomə dəkoˈmærion]	Engsheden suggests that initial /r/ in the village's name given by George of Cyprus could be a corruption of /t/, thus being an early attestation of Duqmira. Derivation from the name of Richomeres, as suggested by Honigmann, seems doubtful.	دقميرة	Κώμη 'Ριχομήριον

=== Qalyubia Governorate ===
English name	Coptic name		Transliteration and pronunciation		Etymology	Arabic name	Ancient Greek name
English name	Bohairic	Other dialects	Classical Bohairic	Late Bohairic	Etymology	Arabic name	Ancient Greek name
Shubra El-Kheima	ⲥⲁⲡⲣⲱ ϩⲃⲱ		Saprō Hbō: [saˈproː əhˈβoː]	Sabrō Ehwō: [saˈbroː əhˈwoː]	A combination of "hamlet" (Coptic: ϫⲉⲃⲣⲟ) and "cover, tent" (Coptic: ϩⲃⲱ).	شبرا الخيمة	
Musturad	ϯⲙⲟⲛⲓ ⲛ̀ⲥⲟⲣⲁⲧ		ti-Moni en-Sorat: [təmɔˈni ənsoˈrat]	di-Moni en-Sorat: [dəmoˈni ənsoˈrat]		مسطرد	
Qalyub	ⲕⲁⲗⲓⲱⲡⲓ		Kaliōpi: [kalˈjoːpə]	Kaliōbi: [kalˈjoːbə]	From Ancient Greek: Καλλιόπη, lit. 'Calliope'.	قليوب	
Benha	ⲡⲁⲛⲁϩⲟ		Panahō: [pənaˈhɔ]	Banahō: [bənaˈho]	From Ancient Egyptian: pꜣ-ꜥ-n-ꜥḥꜥ, lit. 'the treasury'.	بنها	
Digwa	ϯⲕⲉⲃⲓ		ti-Kebi: [təˈkɛβə]	di-Kewi: [dəˈkɛwə]		دجوي	
Atrib/Tell Atrib	ⲁⲑⲣⲏⲃⲓ		Athrebi: [atʰˈreβə]	Atrebi: [atˈræbə]	From Ancient Egyptian: Ḥw.t-ḥry-ỉb.	أتريب	Ἀθριβις
Tukh	*ⲧⲱϧⲓ		*Tōkhi: [ˈtoxə]	*Tōkhi: [ˈtoːxə]	From Ancient Egyptian: tꜣ-ꜥẖy.t, lit. 'the aviary'.	طوخ	
Al-Hissah	*ϫⲉⲃⲣⲟ ⲡⲁⲗⲟⲗⲓ		*Čebro Paloli: [t͡ʃəβ'rɔ pə'lolə]	*Čebro Baloli: [ʃəb'ro bə'lolə]	A combination of "hamlet" (Coptic: ϫⲉⲃⲣⲟ) and "bunch of grapes" (Coptic: ⲡⲁⲗⲟⲗⲓ).	الحصة	
Qaha	*ⲕⲁϩⲓ		*Kahi: [ˈkahə]	*Kahi: [ˈkahə]	"soil, land, province"	قها	
Saryaqus	ⲥⲓⲣⲓⲁⲕⲟⲥ		Siriakos: [sərjaˈkɔs]	Siriakos: [sərjaˈkos]	From Ancient Greek: Συριακός, name of a governor of Atrib	سرياقوس	
Nawa	ⲛⲁⲩⲓ		Nawi: [ˈnawə]	Nawi: [ˈnawə]		نوى	

=== Alexandria Governorate ===
English name	Coptic name		Transliteration and pronunciation		Etymology	Arabic name	Ancient Greek name
English name	Bohairic	Other dialects	Classical Bohairic	Late Bohairic	Etymology	Arabic name	Ancient Greek name
Alexandria	ⲣⲁⲕⲟϯ/ⲁⲗⲉⲝⲁⲛⲇⲣⲓⲁ	Sahidic: ⲣⲁⲕⲟⲧⲉ [raˈkotə]; Fayyumic: ⲗⲁⲕⲁⲧⲓ [laˈkatə]	Rakoti: [raˈkɔtə] Alexandria: [əleksanˈdriə]	Rakodi: [raˈkodə] Alexandria: [əleksanˈdriə]		الإسكندرية	Ἀλεξάνδρεια
Abuqir	ⲡⲕⲁⲛⲱⲡⲟⲥ		ep-Kanōpos: [əpkəˈnopɔs]	eb-Kanōbos: [əpkəˈnobos]		ابو قير	Κάνωπος
Abu Mina	*ⲁⲡⲁ ⲙⲏⲛⲁ/ϯⲃⲁⲕⲓ ⲍⲓⲛⲱⲛ ⲛⲟⲩⲑⲓ		*Apa Mēna: [ˈapa ˈmena] ti-Baki Zinōn Nouthi: [teˈβakə ziˈnon ˈnutʰə]	*Aba Mēna: [ˈaba ˈmæna] ti-Waki Zinōn Nouti: [deˈwakə ziˈnon ˈnutə]		أبو مينا	Ζηνωνούπολις

=== Monufia Governorate ===
English name	Coptic name		Transliteration and pronunciation		Etymology	Arabic name	Ancient Greek name
English name	Bohairic	Other dialects	Classical Bohairic	Late Bohairic	Etymology	Arabic name	Ancient Greek name
Menouf	ⲡⲁⲛⲟⲩϥ ⲣⲏⲥ		Panouf Rēs:[paˈnuf ˈres]	Banouf Rēs:[baˈnuf ˈræs]	From Ancient Egyptian: pꜣ-jw-nfr, lit. 'the good island'	منوف	Ὀνουφις
Shatanuf	ϣⲉⲑⲛⲟⲩϥⲓ	Sahidic: ϣⲉⲧⲛⲟⲩϥⲉ [ʃətˈnufə]	Šethnoufi: [ʃətʰˈnufə]	Šetnoufi: [ʃətˈnufə]	Either from Ancient Egyptian: šdw-nfr, lit. 'the good property' or Ancient Egyptian: šʾw-nfr, lit. 'the good speration', referring to the town's location, where to branches of the Nile separate	شطانوف	
Ashmun	ϭⲙⲟⲩⲙⲓ (ⲛⲧⲉ ⲡϯϩⲟⲧ)		Čmoumi: [ˈt͡ʃʰmumə]	Čmoumi: [əʃˈmumə]	Possibly related to a word for "spring, source" (Coptic: ⲙⲟⲩⲙⲓ)	أشمون	
Sintiris	*ⲥⲁⲃⲧⲣⲏⲥ		*Sabtrēs: [saβˈtres]	*Sabtrēs: [sabˈtræs]	"Southern wall"	سنتريس	
Gireys	ⲡⲧⲓϩⲟⲧ		p-Tihot: [ptəˈhɔt]	eb-Dihot: [əbdəˈhot]		جريس	
Zawyat Razin	ⲡϣⲁϯ	Sahidic: *ⲛⲓⲕⲉⲩⲥ [niˈkjuːs]	p-Šati: [ˈpʃatə]	eb-Šadi: [əbˈʃadə]	"The saved, rescued one"	زاويه رزين	Νικιους
Damalig	ϯⲙⲉⲗⲉϫ		*ti-Meleg: [təməˈlit͡ʃ]	*ti-Meleg [dəmaˈlɪɟ]	Probably shares name with Milig, which is located 25 km north-east, and the name of which is sometimes recorded as Damilig	دمليج	
Tita	ⲧⲓⲧⲏ		Titē: [tiˈte]	Didē: [dɪˈtæ]		تتا	Τιτη
Singirg		Sahidic: *ⲧⲥⲓⲛϭⲱⲣϭ [tsinˈkʲˈoːrkʲ]; ϣⲉⲛϭⲓⲣⲓϭ [ʃənˈkʲˈirikʲ]			Supposedly shares etymology with a town in Minya Governorate	سنجرج	*Σενκύρκις
Almay	ⲉⲗⲙⲓ		Elmi: [ˈɛlmə]	Almi: [ˈælmə]		الماي	
Mustai	*ⲙⲟⲥⲧⲁⲓ		*Mostai: [mɔsˈtaj]	*Mosdai: [mosˈtaj]	From Ancient Egyptian: Ms-ty	مصطاى	
Milig	ϯⲁⲗⲓⲕⲓⲁ, *ϯⲙⲁⲗⲓϫ		*ti-Malig: [təmaˈlit͡ʃ]	*ti-Malig [dəmaˈlɪɟ]	Reconstructed by Timm as ⲧⲙⲁⲗⲓϫ, although the proper Bohairic form would be either ϯⲙⲁⲗⲓϫ or ⲑⲙⲁⲗⲓϫ. ϯⲁⲗⲓⲕⲓⲁ is probably a corruption of it, although Timm believes that it could be a genuine Graeco-Coptic name	مليج	*Ἁλικία
Al-Batanun	ⲡⲁⲑⲁⲛⲟⲛ		Pathanon: [patʰaˈnɔn]	Batanon:[bataˈnon]		البتانون	
Sarsina/Esh-Shohada	ⲯⲁⲣⲥⲓⲛⲓ		p-Sarsini: [psaɾˈsinə]	eb-Sarsini: [əbsarˈsɪnə]		سرسنا	Καληπατρίτα, Κλεοπάτραι
Tala	ⲧⲁⲗⲁⲛⲁⲩ		Talanaw: [talaˈnaw]	Dalanaw: [dalaˈnaw]	"new Taua"	تلا	Ταυα νέα
Hurayn	*ϩⲁⲩⲣⲉⲓⲛ		Hawrein: [hawˈrɛjn]	Hawrain: [hawˈrajn]	From Ancient Egyptian: Ḥwrn.t	هورين	Αὐρεινις

=== Gharbia Governorate ===
- Tanta – ⲧⲁⲛⲧⲁⲑⲟ (Tantato) /ˈdɑndɑto/
- Zefta – ⲍⲉⲃⲉⲑⲉ (Zewete) /ˈzæβætæ/
- Lake Burullus – ⲗⲓⲙⲛⲏ ⲛⲓⲕⲉϫⲱⲟⲩ (Limne Nikedjow) /ˈlimnæ nɪkæˈɟoːw/
- El–Mahalla El–Kubra – ϯϣⲁⲓⲣⲓ (Dishairi), "the residence" /diˈʃɑiri/
- Difra – ϯⲫⲣⲉ (Tifre) /ˈdifræ/

=== Damietta Governorate ===
- Damietta – ⲧⲁⲙⲓⲁϯ (Damiadi), "port" /ˈdɑmjɑdi/

=== Sinai ===
- Sinai – ⲥⲓⲛⲁ (Sina) /ˈsinɑ/
  - Mount Sinai – ⲧⲟⲟⲩ ⲥⲓⲛⲁ (Toou Sina) /tow ˈsinɑ/
  - Arish – ϩⲣⲓⲛⲟⲕⲟⲣⲟⲩⲣⲁ (Hrinokorura) (Gr.) /hrɪnoˈkorurɑ/
  - Farama – ⲡⲉⲣⲉⲙⲟⲩⲛ (Beremun), "house of Amun" /pæˈræmun/
  - Sheikh Zuweid – ⲃⲁⲓⲧⲩⲗⲟⲩⲁ (Waitulua) /wɑjˈdilwɑ/
  - Mahammediya – ⲅⲉⲣⲁⲥ (Geras) (Gr.) /ˈɡærɑs/
  - El-Qeis – ⲕⲁⲥⲓⲟⲥ (Kasios) (Gr.) /ˈkɑsjos/
- Red Sea – ⲫⲓⲟⲙ ⲛ̀ϩⲁϩ (Fiom Enhah) /fjom ənˈhɑh/

=== Fayyum Governorate ===
- Faiyum – ⲫⲓⲟⲙ (Phiom), "the sea, lake" /fjom/
- Sanhur – ⲥⲩⲛϩⲱⲣ (Synhor), "the residence of Horus" /sɪnˈhoːr/
- Sinnuris – ⲯⲓⲛⲟⲩⲣⲉⲥ (Psinures) (Gr.) /psɪˈnuræs/
- Ibshaway – ⲡⲓϣⲁⲉⲓ (Bishaei) /pɪˈʃɑj/
- Abu Girg – ⲡⲉⲕⲉⲣⲕⲏ (Bekerke), "temple, house of Horus" /pæˈɟærʃæ/
- Tamiyah – ⲧⲁⲙⲁⲟⲩⲓⲥ (Tamauis) (Gr.) /dɑˈmɑwɪs/
- Hawarra – ϩⲟⲩⲱⲣ (Howor), "great house" /hoˈwoːr/
- Lahun – ⲗⲉϩⲱⲛⲉ (Lehone), "the mouth, door" /læˈhoːnæ/

=== Minya Governorate ===
- Minya – ⲧⲙⲱⲛⲏ (Tmone) /dəˈmoːnæ/
- Mallawi – ⲙⲁⲛⲗⲁⲩ (Manlau), "place of textile" /ˈmɑnlɑw/

=== Asyut Governorate ===
- Asyut – ⲥⲓⲱⲟⲩⲧ (Siowt), /ˈsjoːwt/
- Kharga – ϩⲏⲃ (Hib) /hæb/
- Abutig – ⲁⲡⲟⲩⲑⲏⲕ (Abutek), "storehouse" /ɑˈputæk/
- Abnub – ⲡⲁⲛⲟⲩⲃ (Banub), "house, temple of gold" /pɑˈnub/
- Manfalut – ⲙⲁⲛⲃⲁⲗⲟⲧ (Manwalot), "place of leather clothing" /mɑnˈbɑlot/

=== Sohag Governorate ===
- Akhmim – ⲭⲙⲓⲛ, ϣⲙⲓⲛ (Khmin, Shmin), "the abode of Min" /kəˈmim, ʃəˈmim/
- Abydos – ⲉⲃⲱⲧ (Ebot) /æˈβoːt/
- Girga – ϭⲉⲣϭⲉ, ⲧⲓⲛ (Cherche, Tin), "the Horus" /ˈʃærʃæ, din/
- Wannina – ⲁⲧⲣⲓⲡⲉ (Atribe), "palace, temple of Repyt" /ɑˈdripæ/

=== Luxor Governorate ===
- Luxor – ⲛⲏ (Ne) /næ/
- Esne – ⲥⲛⲏ (Sne) /snæ/

=== Qena Governorate ===
- Qena – ⲕⲱⲛⲏ (Kone) /ˈkoːnæ/
- Dendera – ⲧⲉⲛⲧⲱⲣⲓ, ⲛⲓⲧⲉⲛⲧⲱⲣⲓ (Dendori, Nidendori), "the goddess" /dæˈdoːri, nɪdænˈdoːri/

=== Aswan Governorate ===
- Aswan – ⲥⲟⲩⲁⲛ (Suan), "place of trade" /ˈswɑn/
  - Elephantine – ⲓⲏⲃ (Ieb) /jæb/
  - Philae – ⲡⲓⲗⲁⲕ (Pilak) /ˈpilɑk/
- Edfu – ⲉⲧⲃⲟ (Etwo) /ˈætbo/
- Kom Ombo – ⲙⲃⲱ (Mbo) /məˈβoː/
- Qasr Ibrim – ⲡⲣⲓⲙ (Brim) /prim/

== Outside of Egypt ==
- Jerusalem – ϩⲓⲉⲣⲟⲩⲥⲁⲗⲏⲙ (Hierusalim) /heˈrusɑlɪm/
- Rome – ϩⲣⲱⲙⲏ (Hroma) /əhˈroːmɑ/
- Damascus – Ⲇⲁⲙⲁⲥⲕⲟⲥ (Damaskos) /dɑˈmɑskos/
- Gilan – ⲕⲓⲗⲁⲛ (Kilan) /ˈkɪlɑn/
- Hamadan – ⲁⲙⲁϩⲁⲑⲁⲛ (Amahatan) /ɑˈmɑhɑtɑn/
- Shusha – ⲥⲟⲩⲥⲱⲛ (Souson) /suˈsoːn/
- Khuzestan – ⲟⲍⲉⲟⲥ (Ozeos) /oˈzæws/
- Tigris – ϯⲅⲣⲓⲥ, ⲡⲛⲁϭ ⲛ̀ⲓⲉⲣⲟ (Tigris, Bnach Eniero) /ˈdigrɪs, əpˈnɑʃ əˈnero/

=== Countries ===
- Israel – ⲡⲓⲥⲣⲁⲏⲗ (Pisrael) /pɪsˈrɑjl/
- Greece – ϯⲉⲗⲗⲁⲥ (ti-Ellas) /delˈlɑs/
- Cyprus – ⲕⲩⲡⲣⲟⲥ (Kupros) /ˈkipros/
- Ethiopia – ⲉⲑⲱϣ (Etosh) /æˈtoːʃ/
- Libya – ϯⲗⲩⲃⲏ, ⲗⲏⲃⲓ (ti-Luwi, Liwi) /diˈliβæ, ˈliβi/
- Syria – ϯⲥⲩⲣⲓⲁ (ti-Suria) /diˈsirjɑ/
- India – ϩⲉⲛⲧⲟⲩ (Hendou), ⲑⲉⲛⲧⲓⲕⲏ /ˈhændu, tænˈdikæ/
