= Qutur, Egypt =

Qutur قطور
- City
- Location in Egypt
- Coordinates: 30.973452°N 30.956279°E
- Country: Egypt
- Governorate: Gharbia

Population (2020)
  - Total: 31,366
- Time zone: UTC+2 (EET)
  - Summer (DST): UTC+3 (EEST)

Qutur, or Kotoor (Arabic: قطور), is a city in the Gharbia Governorate, Egypt. It is the seat of Qutur Center. Its population was estimated at 33,599 people in 2025 making it the smallest city in Gharbia Governorate.

== History ==
Qutour is one of the ancient villages of Egypt. It was mentioned as "Qutour" in the Gharbia province among the villages listed in the Rok El-Salahi (land registry) compiled by Ibn Mammati in his book Qawanin Al-Dawawin. It was also listed under the same name in the Rok El-Nasiri recorded by Ibn Al-Ji'an in Al-Tuhfa Al-Saniya fi Asma’ Al-Bilad Al-Misriya. In 1228 AH / 1813 CE, during the land survey conducted by Muhammad Ali Pasha, Qutour was documented among the villages of the Gharbia Governorate. In the 1882 census, Qutour was listed as a subordinate of Kafr El-Sheikh District, but was later reassigned to the Tanta District.

Historian Hossam Mohamed Abdel-Moaty suggested that Qutour was likely founded by Moriscos who migrated to Egypt. A decree issued on June 27, 1948, established Qutour as the center of a newly formed district composed of 33 localities, with Qutour designated as its administrative capital.

== Geography ==
Qutour is located in the center of the Nile Delta in northern Egypt. Like much of the Delta, its soil is black, clayey, and alluvial, formed by Nile silt. The city experiences a warm climate in winter and a hot climate in summer, remaining relatively moderate throughout the year. It lies within the central region of the Delta, which receives low annual rainfall, ranging between 25 mm and 100 mm.

Qutour is bordered by the districts of Kafr El-Sheikh and Qaleen to the north, El-Mahalla El-Kubra to the east, Tanta to the south, and Basyoun to the west.

== Population ==
As of 2025, Qutour has an estimated population of 33,599, making it the smallest city in Gharbia Governorate. The city's share of the governorate’s urban population increased from 1.756% in 1986 to 2.04% by 2006. The population growth rate between 1996 and 2006 was 1.663%. The average household size was 4.2—the highest in the governorate. Infant mortality rate was reported at 19.56 per 1,000 live births.

The majority of the population is Sunni Muslim, with a small Coptic Orthodox Christian minority. According to the 1986 census, there were 16,476 Muslims and 104 Christians in the city.

== Education ==
Qutour hosts a range of educational institutions, including primary, preparatory, secondary schools, and Azhar institutes. The largest educational demographic in 2017 was those with intermediate vocational education (6,173 individuals), followed by university graduates (3,434) and illiterate individuals (4,126) among those over the age of 10. A total of 1,014 individuals had enrolled but dropped out of education, while 5,478 had never enrolled. The city is also home to a cultural center and a public library established in 1978.

== Administrative division ==
Qutour serves as the administrative center of the Qutour District, which includes the city itself, six local administrative units (Beltag, Abshway Al-Malak, Damat, Al-Shein, Shubra Niyas, and Segin Al-Koum), and 30 villages. The current head of the city and district is Yasser Abdel Moneim Abu El-Fotouh. The total area of the Qutour District is approximately 230.19 square kilometers.

== Infrastructure ==
=== Road network ===
Qutour is connected to neighboring cities such as Tanta, Kafr El-Zayat, and El-Mahalla El-Kubra through a network of regional roads. While no international-standard highways pass directly through the city, these regional routes are heavily used due to the area's high population density and provide effective means of intra-governorate and inter-governorate travel.

=== Railway ===
Qutour Railway Station is part of the main railway line linking Cairo to various cities in the Nile Delta. The station is a stop for several trains, including Train No. 809, which departs Cairo at 6:25 PM and arrives in Qutour at 8:37 PM, stopping at eight stations along the way. The total journey duration is approximately two hours and twelve minutes.

The Egyptian National Railways (ENR) has recently initiated infrastructure improvements at Qutour station. These include the removal of outdated structures as part of broader efforts to modernize the facility and enhance passenger services.

== Economy ==
The economy of Qutour is primarily based on agriculture and services. The district houses 3,050 livestock units, representing about 3.8% of the governorate’s total—this relatively low share is attributed to limited fodder cultivation in the area. However, Qutour is the governorate’s leading producer of onions, with 10,235 feddans cultivated. The city also has a jasmine processing plant that serves neighboring villages.

Qutour is connected by the Tanta–Kafr El-Sheikh railway line, providing links to cities such as Shibin, Belqas, Biyala, and Qaleen.
