= Mostafa Kamal Tolba =

Egyptian scientist (1922–2016)

- مصطفى كمال طلبة
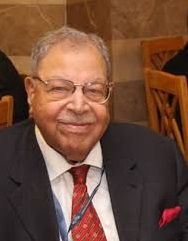

President of the Egyptian Olympic Committee
- In office 1971–1972
- Preceded by: Muhammad Abu el-Ezz
- Succeeded by: Abdel Moneim Wahbi Hussein

2nd Executive Director of United Nations Environment Programme
- In office 1975–1992
- Preceded by: Maurice Strong
- Succeeded by: Elizabeth Dowdeswell

Personal details
- Born: 8 December 1922 Zefta, Gharbia Governorate, Egypt
- Died: 28 March 2016 (aged 93) Geneva, Switzerland
- Profession: Doctor

Mostafa Kamal Tolba (Arabic: مصطفى كمال طلبة) (8 December 1922 – 28 March 2016) was an Egyptian scientist who served for seventeen years as the executive director of the United Nations Environment Programme (UNEP). In that capacity he led development of the Montreal Protocol, which saved the ozone layer and thus millions of lives from skin cancer and other impacts.

== Biography ==
Mustafa Kamal Tolba was born in the town of Zifta (located in Gharbia Governorate), Tolba graduated from Cairo University in 1943 and obtained a PhD from Imperial College London five years later. He established his own school in microbiology at Cairo University's Faculty of Science and also taught at the University of Baghdad during the 1950s. In addition to his academic career, Tolba worked in the Egyptian civil service.

After serving briefly as President of the Egyptian Olympic Committee (1971–1972), Tolba led Egypt's delegation to the landmark 1972 Stockholm Conference, which established the United Nations Environment Programme. Tolba became UNEP's Deputy Executive Director immediately after the conference, and two years later was promoted to executive director.

During his long tenure as director of UNEP (1975–1992), he played a central role in the fight against ozone depletion, which culminated with the Vienna Convention (1985) and the Montreal Protocol (1987). He enabled these negotiations by serving as a bridge between ministers and scientists since they did not understand each others' language. He described the Montreal Protocol as a "start and strengthen" treaty, where the parties started modestly, gained the knowledge they needed to phase out the dangerous chemicals, and gained the confidence they needed to do more.

He successfully steered negotiations for the Basel Convention on transboundary hazardous waste. He was a significant influence in the creation and organization of the Intergovernmental Panel on Climate Change, and the Global Environment Facility. He led the work to develop the Convention on Biological Diversity.

In 1982, Mostafa K. Tolba, as executive director of the United Nations environmental program, told UN delegates that if the nations of the world continued their present policies, they would face by the turn of the century ''an environmental catastrophe which will witness devastation as complete, as irreversible, as any nuclear holocaust.''

Tolba died on 28 March 2016 in Geneva at the age of 93.

== Publications ==
Tolba's publications include more than 95 papers on plant pathology, as well as over 600 statements and articles on the environment.

Sporting positions
Preceded by Muhammad Abu el-Ezz	President of the Egyptian Olympic Committee; 1971–1972	Succeeded by Abdel Moneim Wahbi Hussein
Non-profit organization positions
Preceded by Maurice Strong	Executive Director of UNEP; 1975–1992	Succeeded by Elizabeth Dowdeswell
