= Russ Mantle =

British cyclist and million-mile record holder

Personal information
- Nickname: The Million Mile Man
- Born: 1936
- Died: 1 May 2023 (aged 86–87) Aldershot, Hampshire, England

Cycling career
- Sport: Cycling
- Current team: Farnham Road Club, West Surrey CTC
- Disciplines: Road, Time trial
- Role: Rider
- Rider type: Touring, Time trialist

Russell "Russ" Mantle (1936 – 1 May 2023) was a British cyclist who became the first person in the United Kingdom to record cycling one million miles in a lifetime. A lifelong amateur and former competitive time trialist, Mantle reached the milestone on 7 November 2019, after 68 years of meticulous record-keeping.

== Early life ==
Mantle was born in 1936. He completed his National Service before embarking on a career as a carpenter and joiner. He later served as a civil servant for the Department of the Environment (now Defra) for 25 years until his retirement.

== Cycling career ==
Mantle began cycling in 1951 at the age of 15. A year later, he purchased a Coventry Eagle racing bike; for the rest of his life, he notably constructed his own bicycles from individual frames rather than purchasing complete bikes.

=== Racing ===
Between 1953 and 1975, Mantle was a prolific competitor in time trials. He won 28 open time trial events and held several club and course records. In the 1955 National 25-mile championship, he achieved his highest championship placing, coming sixth with a time of 58:35.

=== The Million Miles ===
Mantle was renowned for his meticulous logging of every mile cycled. Since 1952, he maintained handwritten diaries that documented his mileage, weather conditions, wind direction, and the cafes where he stopped.

On 7 November 2019, at the age of 82, Mantle completed his millionth mile by cycling from his home in Aldershot to the Canal Café in Mytchett, Surrey. To reach this figure, he averaged 14,700 miles per year over a 68-year period. His highest annual mileage was 22,550 miles in 2001.

== Personal life and death ==
Mantle was a life member of Cycling UK, the Farnham Road Club, and the West Surrey CTC, where he served as a "run leader" for 20 years. Despite suffering several serious accidents during his decades of cycling, he famously never wore a cycling helmet.

Mantle died on 1 May 2023, at the age of 86. Following his death, he was commemorated with a plaque on the "Famous Faces" wall in Farnham.
