= El Santa =

El Santa السنطة
- City
- Location in Egypt
- Coordinates: 30.824722°N 30.815278°E
- Country: Egypt
- Governorate: Gharbia

Population (2018)
  - Total: 42,000
- Time zone: UTC+2 (EET)
  - Summer (DST): UTC+3 (EEST)

El Santa (Egyptian Arabic: السنطة [esˈsɑntˁɑ], from Coptic: ⲡ̀ⲥⲉⲛⲉⲧⲁⲓ late Coptic: [əpˈsænætæ]) is a city in the Gharbia Governorate, Egypt. Its population was estimated at 42,000 people in 2018. El-Santa was originally part of the Al-Ja'fariyya district. A decision was made in 1884 to transfer the administrative center of that district to El-Santa due to its connection to the railway line. The district's name remained unchanged until February 22, 1896, when it was officially renamed El-Santa District.

The area known as Manshat El-Santa originated as a satellite locality of El-Santa but was separated administratively in 1932. In the following year, it was granted land demarcation taken from El-Santa, Abu El-Gohour, and Messehalla. In 1960, it was annexed to El-Santa village to form the current city of El-Santa.

== Geography ==
El-Santa is located in the center of the Nile Delta, occupying flat terrain composed of dark alluvial clay deposited by Nile silt. The land is slightly elevated relative to the surrounding agricultural areas and slopes gently from south to north. The old town overlooks the eastern branch of the Bahr Shebeen canal and is bordered by other waterways. The nearby district of Manshat El-Santa is situated approximately 1.5 kilometers from the town center, near the railway line.

The city experiences a warm climate in winter and hot summers, with relatively moderate conditions throughout the year. It lies within Egypt’s central arid zone, where annual rainfall ranges between 25 mm and 100 mm.

El-Santa has seen substantial urban growth over time. Its area expanded from 17.5 feddans in 1897 to 24.7 feddans in 1937, 28 feddans in 1947, 42.8 feddans in 1966, and 371 feddans by 1986—representing a total increase of 767%. By 2007, the estimated area of the city reached 1.2 square kilometers.

The El-Santa District is bordered by El-Mahalla El-Kubra to the north, Zefta to the east, Tanta to the west, and Barkat El-Sabe District to the south.

== Population ==
As of 2025, El-Santa has an estimated population of 48,038. It is a relatively small city compared to the governorate capital Tanta and the largest city, El-Mahalla El-Kubra. Among residents aged over ten, the largest educational group holds vocational secondary education (7,698), followed by university graduates (5,263), and illiterates (4,221), out of a total of 30,558. In 2005, the enrollment rate across all educational stages was 88.4%. The per capita share of green space was 0.25377 square meters. The average household size was 3.7, with a population growth rate of 1.6538% between 1996 and 2006.

The city's population increase is largely attributed to migration, which accounted for 95.15% of the growth from 1986 to 1996 and 94.6% from 1996 to 2006. The annual growth rate was 3.2% in 1986, 2.3% in 1996, and 1.6% in 2006. El-Santa has a cultural center with a public library established in 1979.

== Religion ==
The majority of El-Santa's population are Muslims. According to the 1986 census, there were 29,881 Muslims and 629 Christians. Key mosques include El-Menshawy Mosque, El-Samanoudy Mosque, and the Railway Station Mosque. The city has two churches: the Church of the Virgin Mary in El-Santa proper and the Church of Saint George in Manshat El-Santa. Both are Coptic Orthodox and fall under the jurisdiction of the Diocese of Tanta, headed by Bishop Bola.

== Economy ==
El-Santa's economy is primarily based on agriculture. The town is well-connected by major roads to Tanta and Zefta, as well as other local routes linking it to nearby villages. It is particularly known for grape cultivation and raisin production, for which it ranks first in Egypt. The district contains 5,967 livestock units, representing 7.5% of the governorate’s livestock, ranking sixth among the province’s districts.

The city has several factories, including 56 food production facilities. The most notable is the Al-Fath dairy factory, the largest of its kind in Gharbia, along with feed production factories like Al-Badri.

El-Santa has the largest water treatment plant in the Gharbia Governorate, covering 17 feddans with a production capacity of 1,500 liters/second, serving around 600,000 people. The city also hosts a relay station for Quran Radio Egypt. It lies on the railway line connecting Tanta to Zagazig, with further links to Zefta and Meet Ghamr, and connects to the Tanta–Mansoura–Damietta line at Mahalla Ruh.

== Administrative Division ==
El-Santa serves as the administrative center of El-Santa District. It comprises the city itself and ten local units: Al-Ja'fariyya, Kafr Kila Al-Bab, Al-Qurshiyya, Mit Hawi, Shubraqas, Ishnaway, Al-Gamiza, and Messehalla. In total, the district contains 44 villages. The district spans an area of 218.53 km², ranking fifth in the governorate by size. The current head of the district and city is Mona Ibrahim Saleh Abu Wark.

== Notable people ==
Among the prominent figures from El-Santa is Othman Radi Al-Santawi, a renowned scholar in Quranic recitation and the ten canonical readings, active during the 13th and 14th centuries AH.
