= Kimon Evan Marengo =

British cartoonist (1904–1988)

Kimon Evan Marengo (4 February 1904 – 4 November 1988), better known for his pen name Kem, was a British cartoonist who was born in Zifta, Egypt. He was the son of Evangelos Marangos, a Greek cotton merchant.

Marengo grew up in the Greek community in Alexandria, Egypt. In his childhood he produced his own satirical hobby magazine. In 1929 he went to study at the Ecole des Sciences Politiques in Paris, graduating in 1931. He began to draw cartoons for newspapers, including Le Canard enchaîné, Le Petit Parisien, the Daily Herald and The Daily Telegraph.

Marengo attended the University of Oxford in 1939, but when World War II erupted, he joined the Ministry of Information and drew 3.000 propaganda posters, leaflets and political cartoons in various languages, including three dialects of Arabic and Persian. This included British propaganda effort to get the support of the Persians. He wrote eight books. He was also involved in activities of the Political Warfare Executive in France, North Africa and later the Middle East.

After the war Marengo went back to his studies in Oxford and graduated at the end of 1946 due to accelerated BA programme. His eventual thesis was The Cartoon as a Political Weapon in England: 1783-1832.

From 1939 he designed and printed his own Christmas cards for his friends and business connections. They invariably consisted of a cartoon depicting a major political development of the outgoing year. He also imprinted on them his cartoonist coat of arms: a shield with a drawing of his face and the word 'Kem' on a green field, supported on either side by an African man in white, wearing a red fez and bandana and cocking a snook. It was topped by a coronet with the motto at the bottom, 'Après moi le déluge'.

He had two sons with his wife Una, Richard and Alexander.

== Publications ==
- Oua Riglak. Gare les Pattes, 1928
- Alexandrie, Reine de la Méditerranée, 1928
- Toy Titans, 1937
- Adolf and his donkey Benito, 1942
- Lines of attack, 1944
