= Alaa Aladdin Mumohamed Elghobashy =

Alaa Aladdin Mumohamed Elghobashy علاء الدين محمد الغباشي
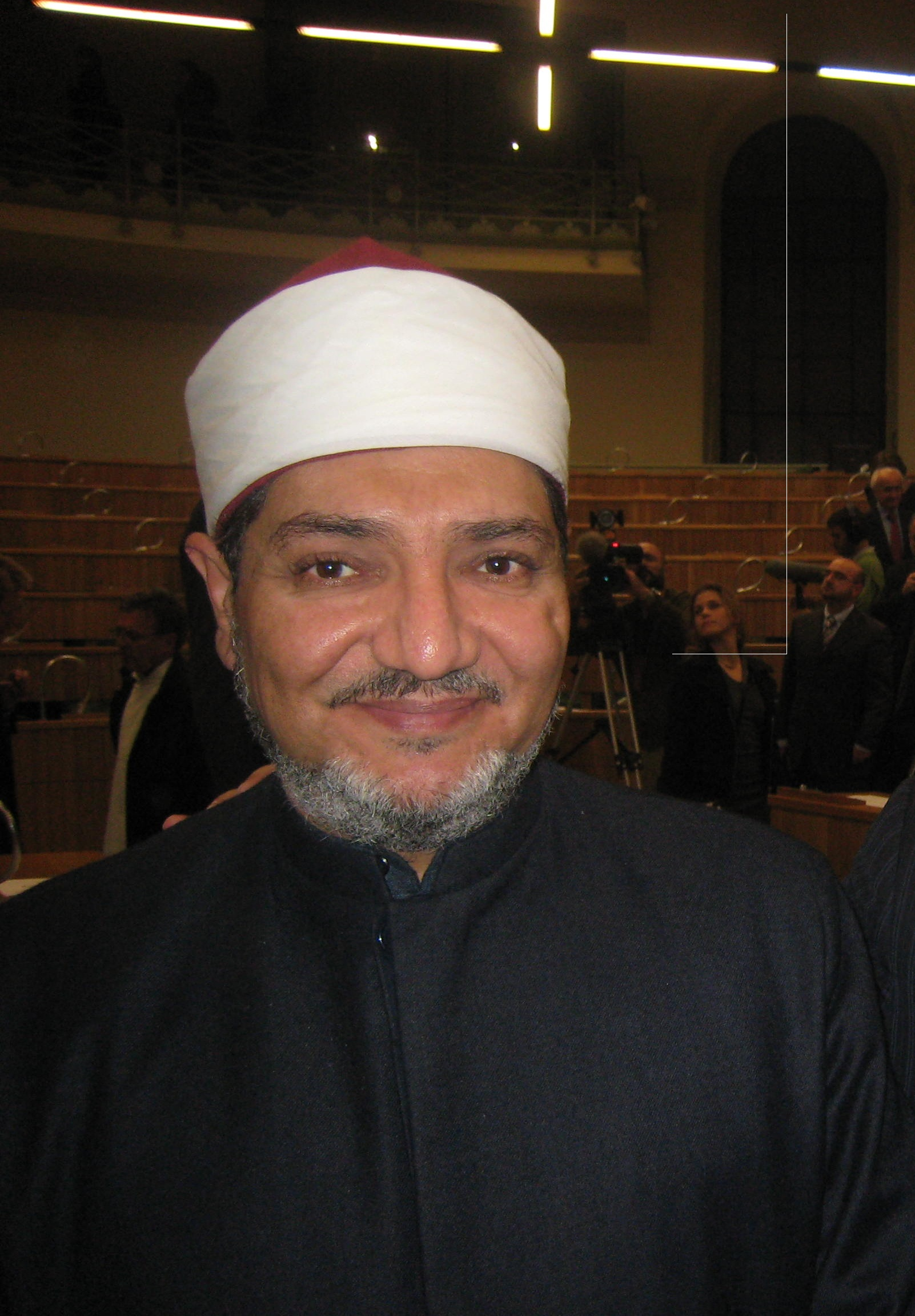

Imam

Personal details
- Born: Alaa Aladdin Mumohamed Elghobashy; 21 August 1957; Gharbia Governorate, Egypt
- Died: 21 June 2011 (aged 53)

Aladdin Mumohamed Elghobashy (Arabic: علاء الدين محمد الغباشي; January 8, 1957 – June 21, 2011) was an Egyptian imam.

== Positions held ==
Grand Imam of al-Azhar and the Islamic Cultural Center in Rome from 2006 to 2011, he was later appointed in search of an Islamic public administration Islamic Research in Cairo and Imam of the Islamic Center of Las Vegas. Artistic Director of the Office of the Secretary General of the Islamic Research Academy in Cairo, he worked at the Islamic University of Imam Muhammad bin Saud.
