= DEFRA =

DEFRA may refer to:

- Deficit Reduction Act of 1984, United States law
- Department for Environment, Food and Rural Affairs, United Kingdom government department
- Defra (دفرة), an Egyptian town
