= Milig, Egypt =

Village in Monufia Governorate, Egypt

Milig مليج Milīj
- Location in Egypt Milig (Egypt)
- Coordinates: 30.59574°N 31.0373°E
- Country: Egypt
- Governorate: Monufia
- Elevation: 56 ft (17 m)
- Time zone: UTC+2 (EET)
  - Summer (DST): UTC+3 (EEST)

Milig (Arabic: مليج, romanized: Milīj) is a village in Monufia Governorate of Egypt, in the Nile Delta. It is a short distance northeast of Shibin El Kom.

Milig's souk meets for three days each week. One day is devoted entirely to the sale of cheese and butter ("suq al-gibna"), with women making up a majority of the merchants and customers, and the other two are for groceries and goods like clothes and kitchen utensils.

The 1885 Census of Egypt recorded Milig (as Melig) as a nahiyah in its own district in Monufia Governorate; at that time, the population of the town was 7,729 (3,903 men and 3,826 women).

The 10th-century geographer al-Muqaddasi listed Milig (as Malīj) among the cities in the Egyptian district of Ar-Rif. A century later, in the 1060s and 70s, the Nile Delta was ravaged by Berber raids as well as famine. A Jewish legal document dated to September 1075, after the raiders had been driven out under Badr al-Jamali, records that Berbers of the Lewata tribe had sacked and looted Malij during the chaotic preceding years.
