= Bani Nasr =

Bani Nasr بني نسر
- Sub-district
- Location in Yemen
- Coordinates: 16°15′27″N 43°37′27″E
- Country: Yemen
- Governorate: 'Amran Governorate
- District: Al Madan District

Population (2004)
  - Total: 9,542
- Time zone: UTC+3

Bani Nasr (Arabic: بني نسر) is a sub-district located in Al Madan District, 'Amran Governorate, Yemen. Bani Nasr had a population of 9542 according to the 2004 census.
