= Bahtit =

Bahtit بحطيط
- Village
- Location in Egypt
- Coordinates: 30.487512°N 31.637363°E
- Country: Egypt
- Governorate: Al Sharqia Governorate
- Markaz: Abou Hammad

Population
  - Total: 10,904
- Time zone: UTC+2 (EET)
  - Summer (DST): UTC+3 (EEST)

Bahtit (Arabic: بحطيط, romanized: baḥṭīṭ IPA: [bæˈħtˤiːtˤ]) is a village in the Markaz Abou Hammad in the Sharqia Governorate of Egypt. It has a population of 10,904 according to the 2006 Egyptian census.

== Notable persons ==
- Mohammed Murad Ghaleb, Egyptian Minister of Foreign Affairs from January to September 1972.
- Dr. Mabrouk Sami, A young Egyptian scientist in the field of Geochemistry since 2010 up till now

Engr.Ahmed Koura, National Authority for tunnels since 2010, then at Abu Hammad Governorate.

== See also ==
- Sharqia Governorate
