= Kafr Az-Zayyat =

Kafr Al-Zayyat كفر الزيات
- City
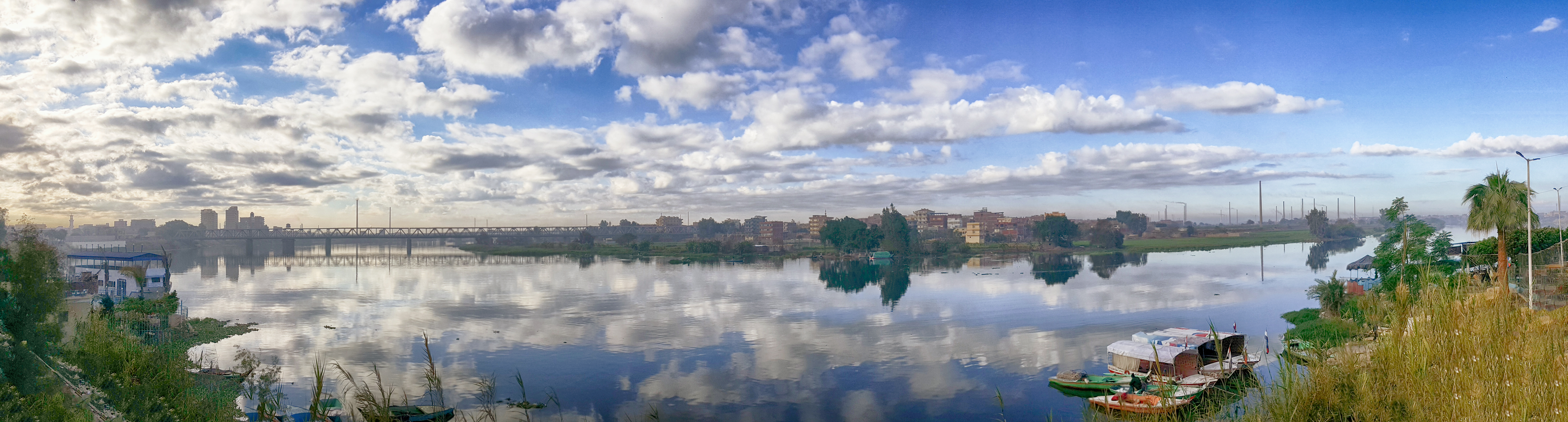
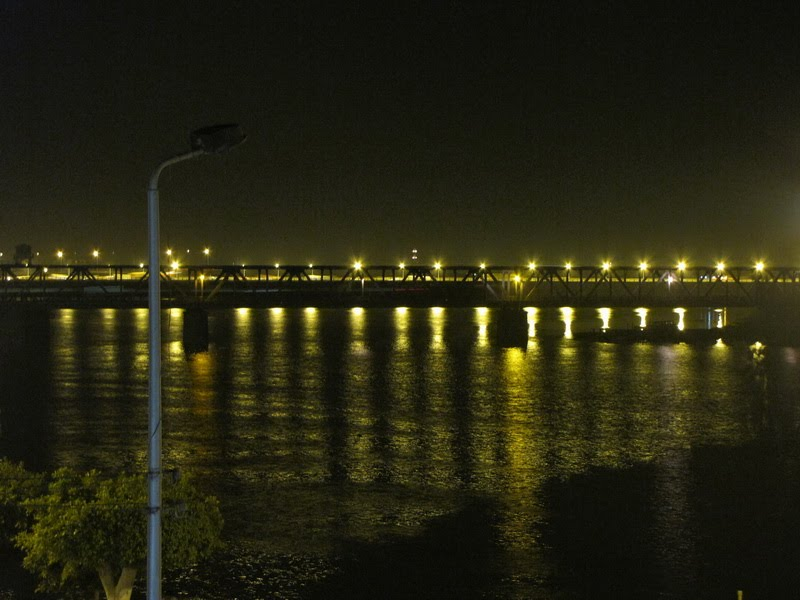
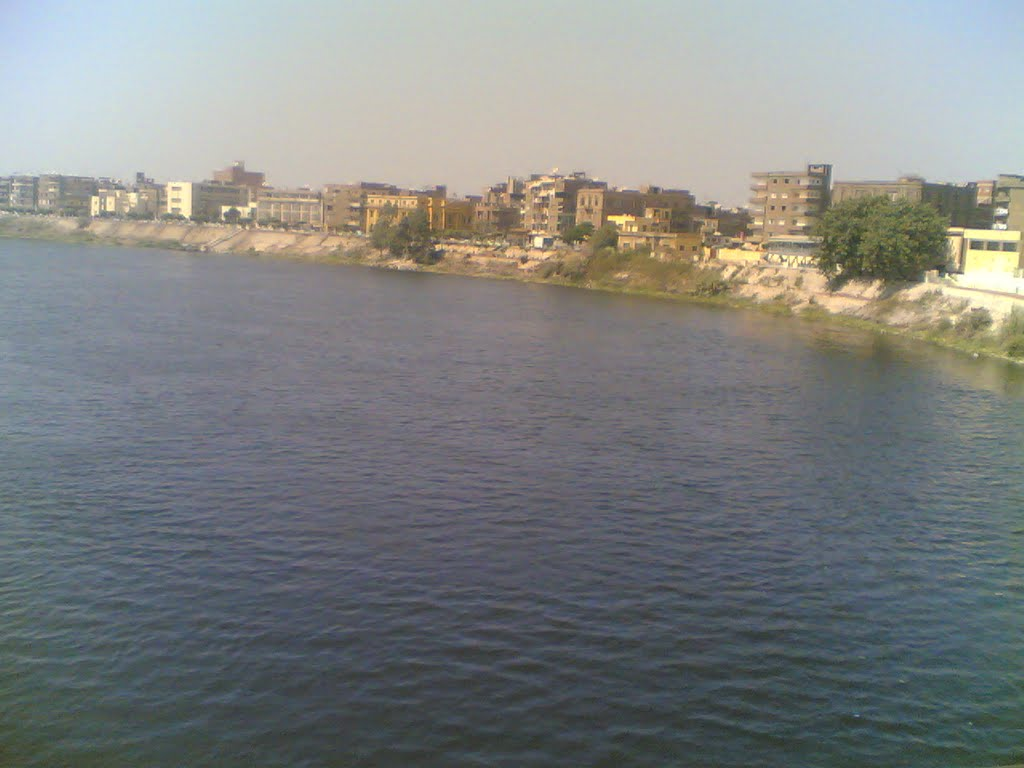

- Location in Egypt
- Coordinates: 30.824722°N 30.815278°E
- Country: Egypt
- Governorate: Gharbia

Population (2023)
  - Total: 86,390
- Time zone: UTC+2 (EET)
  - Summer (DST): UTC+3 (EEST)

Kafr Al-Zayyat (Arabic: كفر الزيات) is a city in the Gharbia Governorate, Egypt. Its population was estimated at 76,000 people in 2018. The older name of the town is Gerisan (Arabic: جريسان).
