= Qaleen =

Type of carpet

Qaleen, also colloquially known as Qalin, Kaleen and Kalin (Persian: قَالِین, romanized: qālīn, lit. 'rug, carpet, tapestry'), is a type of hand knotted-piled carpet. The term is used throughout Turkey, Greater Iran, Central Asia and parts of South Asia (particularly the northern Indian subcontinent), and making qaleens is currently practised as a handicraft in Turkey and Iran. Artisans may need at least two months to make one qaleen. The craft was learned from Persians by the artisans of Kashmir on the Indian subcontinent. These knotted pile carpets so were a blend of Indo-Persian craftsmanship. Qaleens or Ghalichas (Persian: غَلِیچَه, romanized: ġālīča, lit. 'small, thick-woven rug or carpet') were made in the Kashmir region of India and Pakistan.

== Name ==
Qaleen is a word meaning carpet in a number of languages, including Kashmiri, Arabic, Azerbaijani, Turkish (and even other Turkic languages as well), Hindustani (Hindi-Urdu), Punjabi, Gujarati and Bengali.

== History ==
Zain al-Abidin introduced the "Kal baffi" craft (of hand knotted carpets) from Iran to Kashmir in the 15th century. The sultan brought carpet weavers from Iran and Central Asia to Kashmir to train the local inhabitants.

== Structure ==
Kalin, which were smaller in size and were a product of jails in Punjab, were made using one row of knots and another alternate in weft yarns, wool pile, and cotton in warp side.

== Mechanisation ==
Mechanisation and Industrialisation is a threat to many ancient crafts including qaleen bafi (weaving). Now qaleens are made on looms and powerlooms in many parts of India and Pakistan. Islamabad is a centre for qaleen manufacturing, with around 80,000 workers employed in this trade.

== See also ==
- Carpet
- Talim (textiles)
- Qaaleen
