= Zefta =

Zefta زفتى Zifta
- City
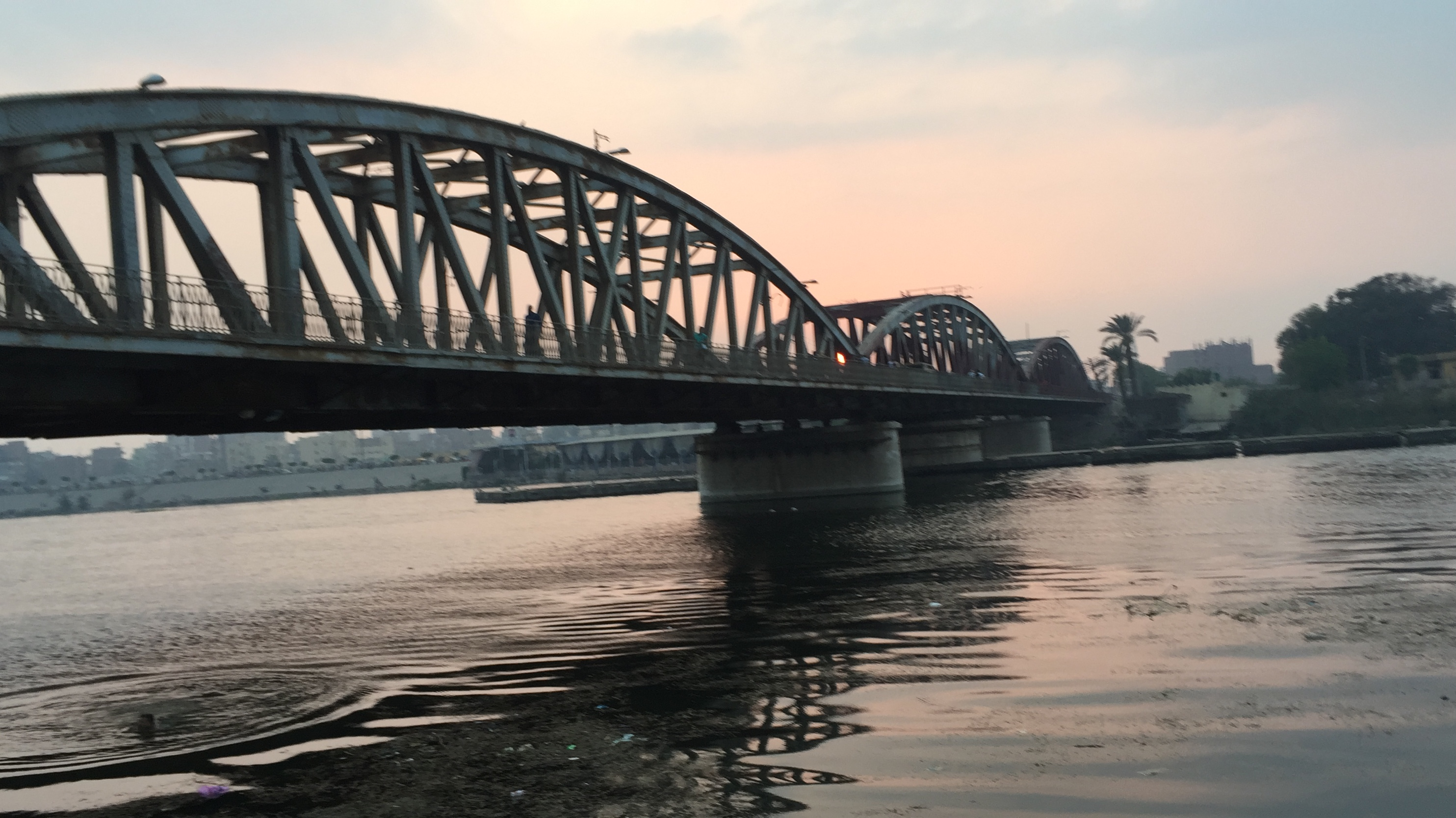
- Zefta Bridge

- Location in Gharbia, Egypt Zefta (Egypt)
- Coordinates: 30.7142°N 31.24425°E
- Country: Egypt
- Governorate: Gharbia

Area
  - Total: 197.4 km^{2} (76.2 sq mi)
- Elevation: 16 m (52 ft)

Population (2023)
  - Total: 114,983
  - Density: 582.5/km^{2} (1,509/sq mi)
- Time zone: UTC+2 (EET)
  - Summer (DST): UTC+3 (EEST)

Zefta (Egyptian Arabic: زفتى pronounced [ˈzeftæ], Coptic: ⲍⲉⲃⲉⲑⲉ Zevethe) is an Egyptian city in the Nile Delta, within the Gharbia governorate, and is the capital of the Zefta center. It is across the Nile from Mit Ghamr city of Ad Daqahliyah governorate. It has around 114,983 inhabitants.

Zefta is known for its notable involvement in the 1919 Egyptian Revolution against British occupation. In March 1919, residents of the town, led by lawyer Youssef El-Guindy, declared Zefta a self-governing republic, an event later referred to as the "Republic of Zefta." The group took control of key facilities, including the police station, railway station, and telegraph office, and established a local council to manage the town’s affairs. A newspaper was also published under the republic’s name to communicate developments to the public.

The initiative saw participation from a wide range of local residents, including farmers, merchants, and others. The republic lasted for approximately ten days before it was suppressed by British forces, including an Australian unit, on 29 March 1919.

== History ==
In the 12th century, Zefta was an important regional trading center, especially for textiles; silk, flax, indigo, sesame, and sugar were among the commodities bought and sold here. Some of these products were consumed locally, while others were sent to other towns, including Cairo.

In the 1670s, Abbas Agha, the Chief Eunuch of the Ottoman Empire, made a large waqf endowment consisting of diverse Egyptian properties. Zefta was home to the single largest number of properties he endowed, leading Jane Hathaway to describe it as his "pet charity". Among Abbas Agha's endowments in Zefta was a large complex where coffee beans were pounded and roasted, along with an associated coffeehouse. Hathaway hypothesizes that, given its earlier importance as a trade center, 17th-century Zefta remained an important entrepot where boats carrying coffee from Suez to Cairo would stop. From Zefta, the coffee would then have been taken into other towns for consumption. Other properties Abbas Agha endowed in Zifta included a qaysariyya, caravanserai, fifteen shops and two workshops, and a school teaching the Qur'an - the only school included in the endowment. He also left four copper vessels to the physicians of Zefta, a rare exception to the rule that waqf endowments must consist of immovable property.

The 1885 Census of Egypt recorded Zifta as a city in its own district in Gharbia Governorate; at that time, the population of the city was 11,087 (5,571 men and 5,516 women).

Zefta is well known in the modern Egyptian history during the 1919 uprising, also known as the Egyptian Revolution of 1919, when the British occupation expelled Saad Zaghloul Pasha out of Egypt along with other leaders of the Wafd Party and were exiled to Malta, the people of Zefta, led by Mohamed El Kafrawy Pasha and Youssef El Guindi, gathered and declared their independence from the crown and named it Zefta Republic. The town of Zefta has also seen the birth of Mostafa Younis, who works in the field of aviation, Fouad Younis, who works as an accountant and the engineer Moghad Younis.

Zefta, is the location of one of Nile barrages built during 1881–1952 to control the Nile flow.

== Climate ==
Zefta has an arid desert climate (Köppen: BWh).

Climate data for Zifta
Month	Jan	Feb	Mar	Apr	May	Jun	Jul	Aug	Sep	Oct	Nov	Dec	Year
Mean daily maximum °C (°F)	20.0 (68.0)	21.3 (70.3)	24.5 (76.1)	28.3 (82.9)	32.3 (90.1)	34.7 (94.5)	35.2 (95.4)	35.2 (95.4)	34.3 (93.7)	31.1 (88.0)	26.6 (79.9)	22.2 (72.0)	28.8 (83.9)
Daily mean °C (°F)	14.4 (57.9)	15.4 (59.7)	17.9 (64.2)	21.1 (70.0)	24.9 (76.8)	27.6 (81.7)	28.8 (83.8)	29.0 (84.2)	27.8 (82.0)	24.8 (76.6)	20.5 (68.9)	16.4 (61.5)	22.4 (72.3)
Mean daily minimum °C (°F)	9.7 (49.5)	10.4 (50.7)	12.2 (54.0)	14.7 (58.5)	18.1 (64.6)	21.1 (70.0)	23.0 (73.4)	23.6 (74.5)	22.4 (72.3)	19.6 (67.3)	15.6 (60.1)	11.9 (53.4)	16.9 (62.4)
Average precipitation mm (inches)	6.9 (0.27)	7.0 (0.28)	4.3 (0.17)	2.0 (0.08)	0.5 (0.02)	0.1 (0.00)	0.2 (0.01)	0.3 (0.01)	0.3 (0.01)	2.7 (0.11)	3.8 (0.15)	4.1 (0.16)	32.2 (1.27)
Source: Weather.Directory

== Education ==
Zefta has a wide range of educational institutions, including primary, preparatory, secondary schools, and Azhar religious institutes. According to the 2017 census, there were 12,732 illiterate individuals and 11,921 university graduates. The largest education category was technical diploma holders (middle-level qualifications), numbering 24,874 out of a total population of 77,138 in 2017. The number of those who dropped out after enrollment was 5,938, while 16,297 never enrolled in any educational institution.

In 2024, Zefta was designated a member of the UNESCO Global Network of Learning Cities, recognizing its commitment to lifelong learning and sustainable development.

== Religion ==
The majority of Zefta’s population are Muslims, with a Christian minority, mostly Coptic Orthodox. According to the 1986 census, Muslims numbered 67,598, and Christians 1,652 out of a total population of 69,253. The city has three churches: the Cathedral of Saint Philopater Mercurius (Abu Sefein), the Church of the Virgin Mary and Saint Mercurius, and the Catholic Church of Saint George.

Historically, Zefta had a significant Jewish community composed mainly of Rabbinic Jews with their own religious court. Between 1104 and 1232 AD, the Jewish population was estimated at 60 to 90 families, or around 300 to 500 individuals. This number declined to just 19 individuals by the 1927 census. Many were originally migrants from the Levant, and some held prominent religious positions in the Nile Delta. The city was also home to Karaite Jews.

== Administrative Division ==
Zefta is the administrative center of Zefta District. The city is divided into six urban quarters (shiakhas), and the district includes 10 local administrative units and 54 villages. The city and district are currently overseen by Mayor Ibrahim Fayed. The district spans an area of 210.11 km², making it the second smallest in the governorate.

== Urban Quarters (2018 Population Estimates) ==
- Sa'da: 22,810
- Jaafar: 13,922
- Al-Aqra': 7,257
- Khalifa: 24,529
- Al-'Azab: 11,536
- Kafr 'Anan: 22,357

== Local Administrative Units ==
In addition to the city of Zefta, the following rural units fall under Zefta District: Al-Ghareeb, Sanbo Al-Kubra, Nahtai, Shabramils, Tafahna Al-Azab, Sanbat, Sharshaba, Sandabast, and Hanout.

== Economy ==
Zefta is known for citrus farming, particularly tangerines and oranges. The district contains 101 food production facilities and 7,794 livestock units, comprising 9.8% of the governorate's total. The city is connected by two railway lines: Tanta–El-Santa–Zefta–Zagazig and Banha–Mit Ghamr. .

Historically, Zefta has been a hub for cotton ginning and textile manufacturing. It was mentioned in al-Khitat al-Tawfiqiyya as having looms for weaving fabrics and steam-powered cotton ginning plants. It produced raw and white baft cloth and was known for its trade in linen, silk, and handwoven rural fabrics sold in Cairo. In 1958, a presidential decree established a fine-spinning company in both Zefta and Mit Ghamr, underscoring the city's industrial importance. The city is also a hub for flax cultivation, producing 20% of Egypt’s national flax output.

== Landmarks ==
=== Zefta Barrages ===
Known locally as the Dehtoura Barrages, they were constructed in 1903 to regulate water flow into the Mediterranean and provide irrigation to canals in the Dakahlia Governorate. The Zefta Barrages were the first major irrigation project in the Nile Delta and the third in Egypt, following the Delta Barrages and Assiut Barrages. The barrages feed the Mansouria Canal and Abbasid Stream. They were renovated in September 1954, and again between 2019 and December 15, 2022. A navigation lock west of the barrage measures 64 meters in length and 12 meters in width.

=== The French Bridge ===
This bridge connects Zefta to Mit Ghamr in Dakahlia Governorate and was built in 1907 during the British occupation of Egypt. It spans approximately 417 meters. Battles took place on the bridge during the short-lived Republic of Zefta.

=== Al-Awwam Mosque ===
Also known as the Mosque of the Sons of Al-Zubayr, it is Zefta’s largest mosque located on the Nile’s bank. It is traditionally believed to have been founded by the companion Al-Zubayr ibn Al-Awwam, later renovated by the Fatimid state, and most recently restored in 1998.

== Popular culture ==
Zefta is referenced in a local proverb: "Nothing worse than Zefta except Mit Ghamr" (with slight variations). The phrase is of English origin, reflecting the transition of British forces from Zefta to Mit Ghamr, where they faced fiercer resistance after suppressing the popular uprising in Zefta.

== Notable Figures ==
- Kimon Evan Marengo (1904–1988): British cartoonist of Greek origin.
- Mostafa Kamal Tolba (1922–2016): Egyptian environmentalist and scientist, former Minister of Youth (1971) and President of the Academy of Scientific Research and Technology (1972).
- Mostafa El-Sayed (1933–): Egyptian-American chemist and recipient of the U.S. National Medal of Science.
- Youssef El-Guindy (1893–1941): Lawyer and politician, elected president of the Republic of Zefta during its brief resistance to British occupation.

== See also ==
- List of cities and towns in Egypt
