= Shabas ash-Shuhada =

Shabas ash-Shuhada شباس الشهداء ϫⲁⲃⲁⲥⲉⲛ, ϫⲁⲡⲁⲥⲉⲛ
- City
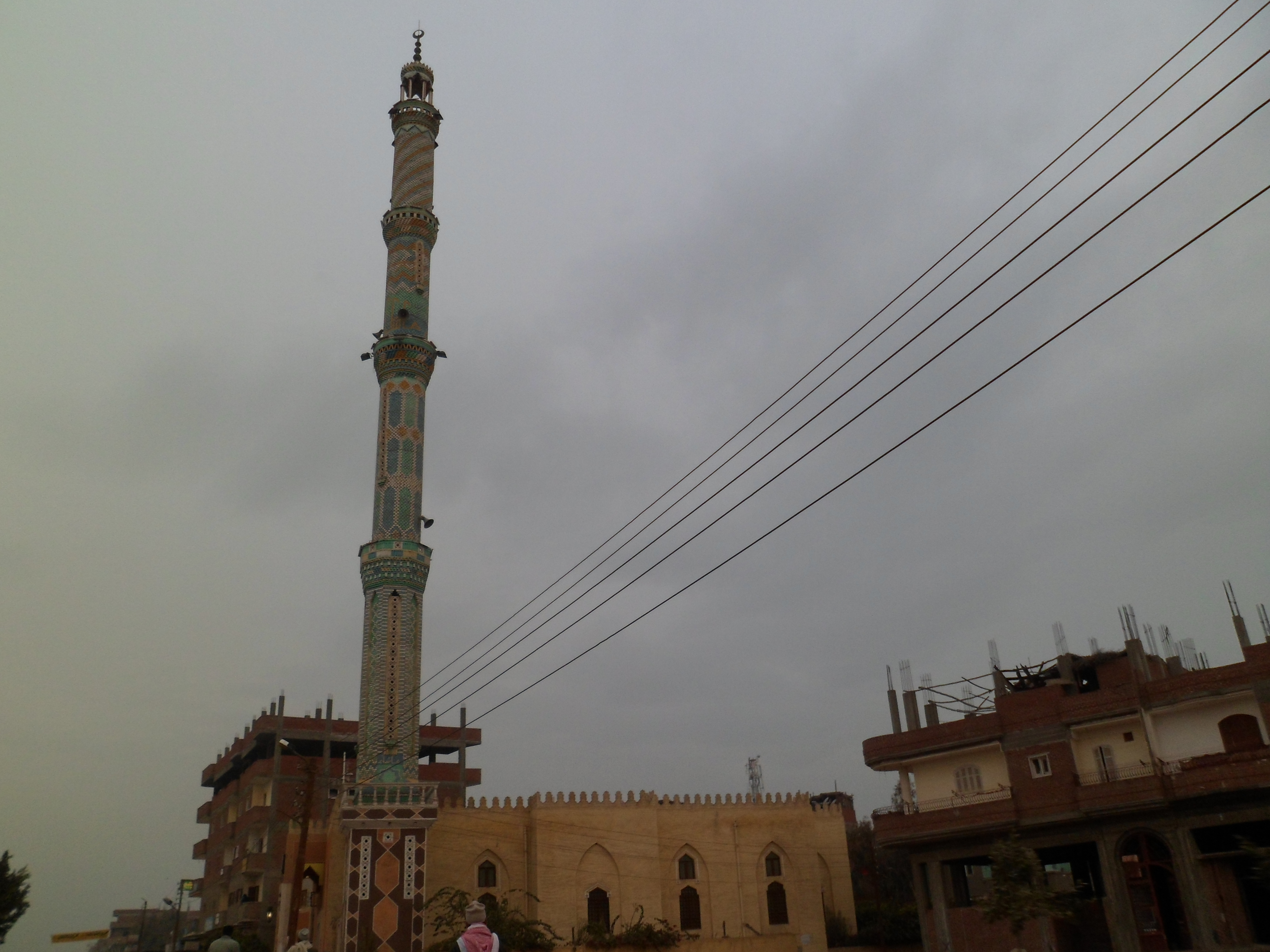
- Al-Malha mosque in Shabas

- Location in Egypt
- Coordinates: 31°5′26.44″N 30°44′51.05″E
- Country: Egypt
- Governorate: Kafr el Sheikh

Population
  - Total: 32,191
- Time zone: UTC+2 (EET)
  - Summer (DST): UTC+3 (EEST)

Shabas ash-Shuhada (Arabic: شباس الشهداء, from Coptic: ϫⲁⲃⲁⲥⲉⲛ, ϫⲁⲡⲁⲥⲉⲛ, romanized: Jabasen, Japasen) is a city in Kafr el-Sheikh Governorate of Egypt.

In Ptolemaic and Byzantine Egypt it was known as Kabasa (Ancient Greek: Καβασα) or Gabasson (Ancient Greek: Γαβάσσων) and was a center of the Kabassite nome, which after the Muslim conquest of Egypt was transformed into a kurah.
