= Biyala =

Biyala بيلا
- City
- Interactive map of Biyala
- Location in Egypt
- Coordinates: 31.174659°N 31.220434°E
- Country: Egypt
- Governorate: Kafr el-Sheikh

Area
  - Total: 40.7 km^{2} (15.7 sq mi)
- Elevation: 1 m (3.3 ft)

Population (2023)
  - Total: 90,729
  - Density: 2,230/km^{2} (5,770/sq mi)
- Time zone: UTC+2 (EST)
  - Summer (DST): UTC+3 (EEST)

Biyala (Arabic; بيلا) is a city located in Kafr El Sheikh Governorate, Egypt. It is subordinate to the Kafr El Sheikh Center.

== Demographics ==
Biyala had a total population of 67,211 residents in 2006, with 33,320 of them being males and 33,891 being females.
