= Abbas Halim =

- Prince
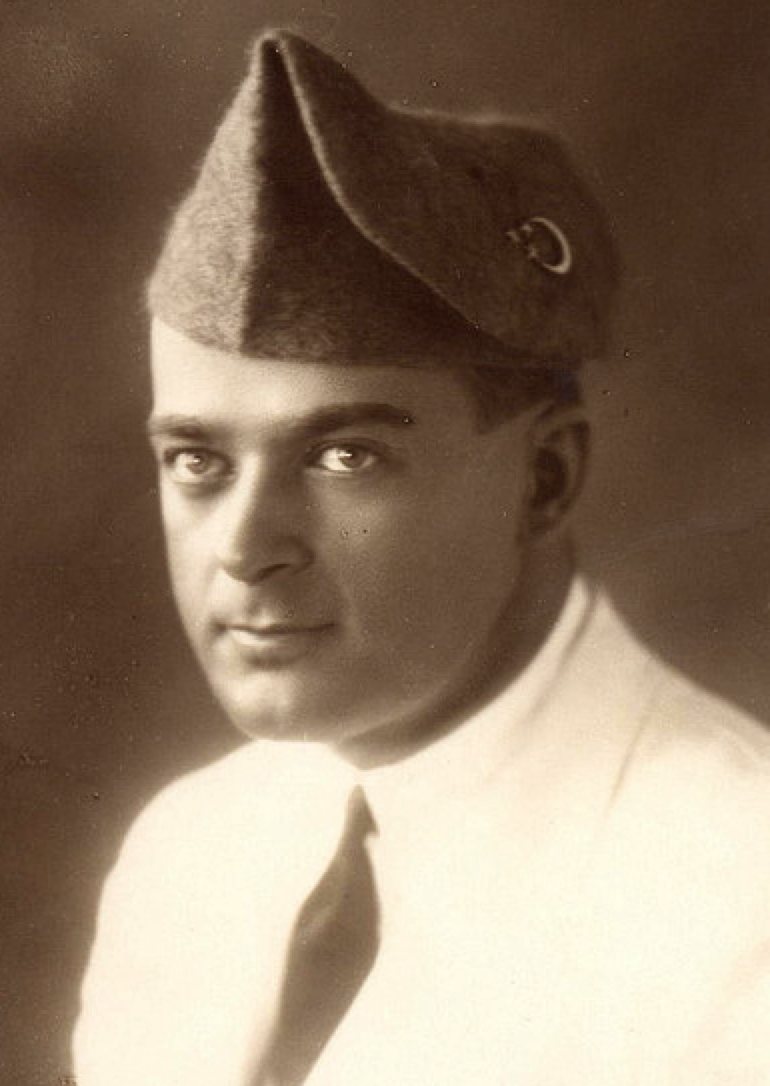
- Born: 9 October 1897; Alexandria, Khedivate of Egypt
- Died: 6 July 1978 (aged 80)
- Dynasty: Muhammad Ali Dynasty

President, Egyptian National Federation of Trade Unions
- In office December 1930 – circa 1934

Personal details
- Party: Wafd Party (affiliated)
- Known for: Labour activism; trade union leadership
- Awards: Iron Cross (WWI)

Abbas Halim (Egyptian Arabic: عباس حليم, 9 October 1897 – 6 July 1978), also known as Nabil Abbas Halim or Sherief Abbas Halim, was a prince of the Muhammad Ali Dynasty and a labour activist in Egypt.

== Early military career and personal life ==
Born in Alexandria at the end of the 19th century, Halim was educated in Germany and fought with the German Air Force during the First World War, becoming a fighter pilot with the rank of first lieutenant and awarded the Iron Cross. He later joined the Ottoman Air Force. After returning to Egypt, Halim founded boxing and sports clubs, led an Egyptian automobile club, and participated in safari hunting.

Michel Antoine Mamlouk recounts that Halim had three children, Mohamed Ali, Ulvia and Nevine, who were educated in Virginia and Pennsylvania in the United States, and that Halim owned the Khedivial Mail Line fleet.

== Political activism in Egypt ==
Halim joined the Wafd Party and fought with his cousin King Fuad I, while also opposing prime minister Isma'il Sidqi's constitutional reforms in 1930. In December 1930 Halim became president of the Egyptian National Federation of Trade Unions, where he fought for improved working and living conditions for the Egyptian working class. King Fuad crossed his name from the list of royal family members after he published a pamphlet stating that the dismissal of democratically elected leaders could cause civil war in Egypt. Halim's association with the Wafd Party was strained in 1931 when he proposed the formation of an Egyptian labor party, though he later reached an agreement with Wafd leader Mustafa el-Nahhas. Following Sidqi's replacement by Abdel Fattah Yahya Ibrahim Pasha Halim redoubled his efforts to organize Egyptian workers, leading to his imprisonment in 1934, which he protested with a hunger strike. His hunger strike led to widespread workers protests and his release.

Halim tried to organize a strike at the Misr Spinning and Weaving Company in El-Mahalla El-Kubra in 1936. He left politics later that year, returning the next year and attempting to lead The committee to Organize the Workers' Movement. He later let the Cairo Tramway Workers' Union and helped organize the Join Transport Federation. According to historian Joel Beinin, Halim and the Wafd both viewed trade union struggles within Egypt as part of a larger nationalist political movement, and not as a political struggle by the working class against class society more broadly. As class conflict intensified in Egypt and the popularity of the Communist Party increased, Halim saw his own influence and that of the nationalist trade unions decline.

Halim was arrested for two years by the British in the 1940s for pro-German sympathies during the Second World War; in the event that the advancing German army led by Erwin Rommel had occupied Cairo, Halim was considered the most likely candidate to be installed as King of Egypt. Despite this, Halim later said that British Ambassador Killearn had at one point asked if the British should appoint him King. British officials called Halim "very popular but obstinate and stupid." Halim was sentenced to 15 years in prison after the Egyptian Revolution of 1952 by the Gamal Abdel Nasser government. While his property was confiscated from him for a time, it was returned in 1975.

== Sources ==
- Beinin, Joel (1988). "Islam, Marxism, and the Shubra al-Khayma textile workers: Muslim Brothers and Communists in the Egyptian trade union movement". In Burke III, Edmund; Abrahamian, Ervand (eds.). Islam, Politics and Social Movements. ISBN 9780520068681.
- Beinin, Joel (2001). Workers and Peasants in the Modern Middle East. Cambridge University Press. ISBN 9780521629034.
- Bidwell (2012). Dictionary Of Modern Arab History. Routledge. ISBN 9780710305053.
- Goldschmidt, Arthur (2000). Biographical dictionary of modern Egypt. Lynne Rienner Publishers.
- Flower, Raymond (2002). Napoleon to Nasser: The Story of Modern Egypt. Authorhouse. ISBN 9781403357465.
- Stadiem, William (1991). Too Rich: The High Life and Tragic Death of King Farouk. Carroll and Graf. ISBN 9780881846294.
