= Kafr El Dawwar =

Kafr Al Dawwar كفر الدوار
- City
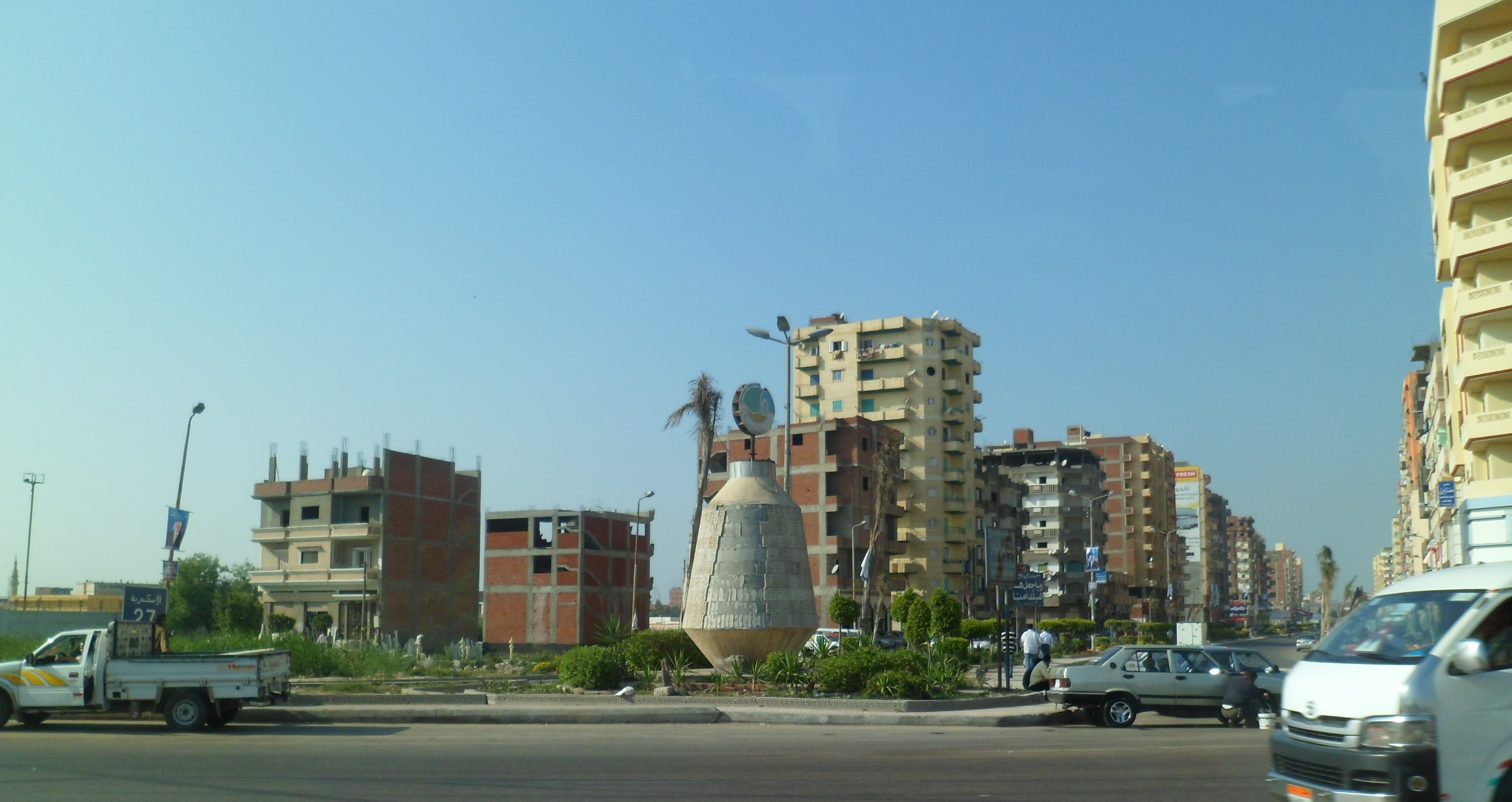

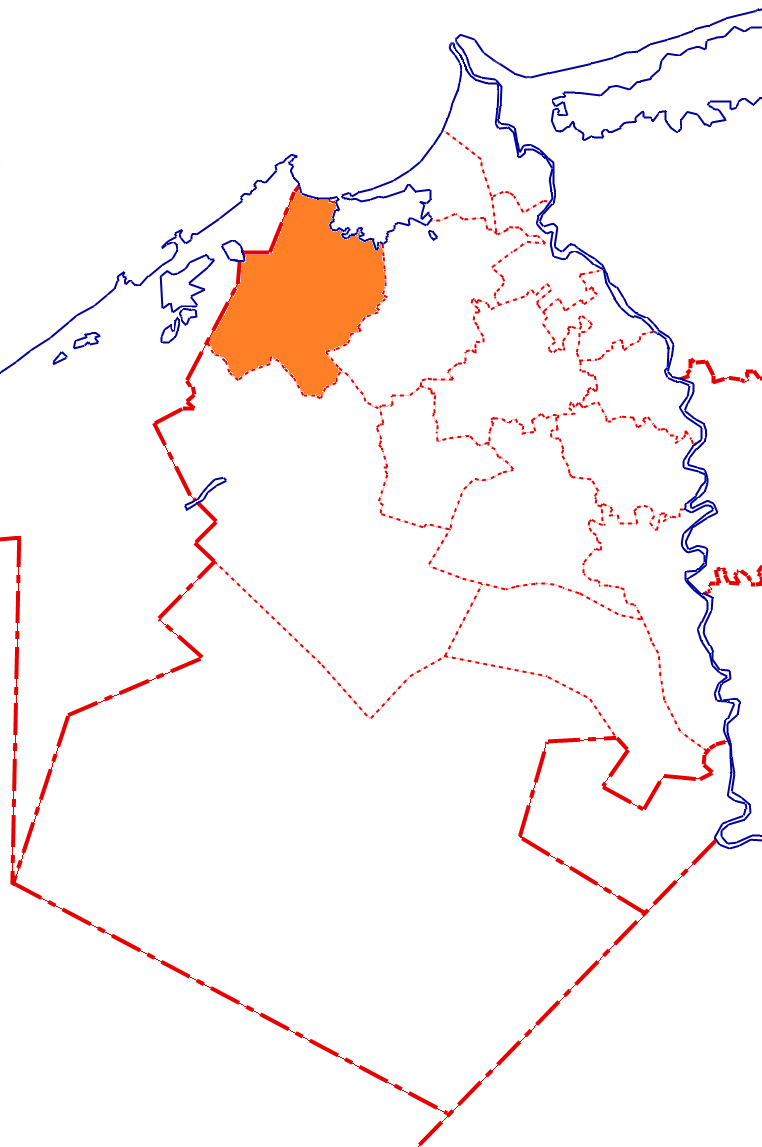
- Location in Buhayrah Governorate

- Location in Egypt Kafr Al Dawwar (Egypt)
- Coordinates: 31°07′52″N 30°07′48″E
- Country: Egypt
- Governorate: Beheira

Area
  - Total: 5.46 km^{2} (2.11 sq mi)
- Elevation: 4 m (13 ft)

Population (2024)
  - Total: 370,000
  - Density: 68,000/km^{2} (180,000/sq mi)

GDP (nominal, constant 2015 values)
  - Year: 2024
  - Total (Metro): $2.3 billion
  - Per capita: $6,216
- Time zone: UTC+2 (EET)
  - Summer (DST): UTC+3 (EEST)
- Area code: (+20) 45

Kafr El Dawwar (Arabic: كفر الدوار, lit. 'town of the farm' Egyptian Arabic pronunciation: [kɑfɾ eddɑwˈwɑːɾ]) is a major industrial city and municipality on the Nile Delta in the Beheira Governorate of northern Egypt. Located approximately 30 km from Alexandria, the municipality has a population of about 370,000 inhabitants and comprises a number of smaller towns and villages.

== History ==
Kafr El Dawwar was the location of the famous Battle of Kafr El Dawwar between the Egyptian army, headed by Ahmed Orabi, and the British army, during the Anglo-Egyptian War of 1882. For five weeks, Orabi was able to stop British forces from advancing toward the Egyptian capital of Cairo. Egyptian victory in the battle compelled the British to change their strategy, with British forces shifting to the Suez Canal to reach Cairo through Tel El Kebir.

In the early months of the Egyptian Revolution of 1952, Kafr El Dawwar was the scene of industrial action that resulted in death sentences for two leaders of the strike.

In September 1984, protests broke out in Kafr El Dawwar over efforts by Hosni Mubarak, Egypt's President, to raise food prices during a period of wage decreases. Thousands of demonstrators threw rocks, and occupied markets and roads. In response, security forces fired rubber bullets and tear gas, killing three persons at a milling plant, and injuring dozens more. Rioting spread to other centres, including the Misr Spinning and Weaving Company in El-Mahalla.

In the vicinity of the Kafr El Dawwar are a great number of ancient cemeteries (including Kom Ishu, Kom El Farag, Sidi Ghazi, Kom Defshu, Kom El Terfayeh, and Tell El Kanaies), where remains of pottery, and other items from Egypt's Ptolemaic era can be found.

== Industry ==
The city is renowned for electricity generation as well as textile and fruit packing industries. Misr for Weaving and Spinning is the largest company in Kafr El Dawwar. Other industrial activities include paint, silk fibers and chemicals. Agriculture is a major activity for the countryside that surrounds the industrial area.

== Geography ==
The Mahmudiyya Canal (Arabic: ترعة المحمودية) goes through Kafr El Dawwar north to Alexandria. It branches west from the Nile, and is the main source of drinking water and irrigation.

=== Climate ===
Kafr El Dawwar is classified by the Köppen-Geiger climate classification system as having a hot desert climate (BWh).

Its highest record temperature, 45 °C (113 °F), was recorded on 30 May 1961, while its lowest record temperature, 0 °C (32 °F), was recorded on 31 January 31, 1994. Kafr El Dawwar has, on average, 38 rainy days annually.

Rafah, Alexandria, Abu Qir, Rosetta, Baltim, Kafr El Dawwar, and Mersa Matruh are the wettest places in Egypt.

Climate data for Kafr El Dawwar
Month	Jan	Feb	Mar	Apr	May	Jun	Jul	Aug	Sep	Oct	Nov	Dec	Year
Record high °C (°F)	29 (84)	33 (91)	40 (104)	41 (106)	45 (113)	44 (111)	43 (109)	39 (102)	41 (106)	38 (100)	36 (97)	29 (84)	45 (113)
Mean daily maximum °C (°F)	17.7 (63.9)	18.3 (64.9)	20.8 (69.4)	24.2 (75.6)	27.5 (81.5)	30.1 (86.2)	30.4 (86.7)	31.2 (88.2)	29.8 (85.6)	28.3 (82.9)	24.4 (75.9)	19.8 (67.6)	25.2 (77.4)
Daily mean °C (°F)	13.2 (55.8)	13.7 (56.7)	15.7 (60.3)	18.6 (65.5)	21.9 (71.4)	25.1 (77.2)	25.9 (78.6)	26.5 (79.7)	25.1 (77.2)	23.1 (73.6)	19.5 (67.1)	15.1 (59.2)	20.3 (68.5)
Mean daily minimum °C (°F)	8.7 (47.7)	9.2 (48.6)	10.7 (51.3)	13 (55)	16.4 (61.5)	20.1 (68.2)	21.5 (70.7)	21.8 (71.2)	20.5 (68.9)	18 (64)	14.7 (58.5)	10.5 (50.9)	15.4 (59.7)
Record low °C (°F)	0 (32)	0 (32)	2 (36)	4 (39)	7 (45)	12 (54)	17 (63)	18 (64)	14 (57)	11 (52)	1 (34)	1 (34)	0 (32)
Average precipitation mm (inches)	43 (1.7)	29 (1.1)	9 (0.4)	3 (0.1)	2 (0.1)	0 (0)	0 (0)	0 (0)	0 (0)	6 (0.2)	21 (0.8)	41 (1.6)	154 (6)
Source 1: Climate-Data.org
Source 2: Voodoo Skies for record temperatures

== Government ==
Kafr El Dawwar, like many other cities in Egypt, has a city council, which takes care of issues related to building permits and zoning.

== Notable people ==
- Hassan Shehata, former manager of Egypt's national football team.
- Tarek El Ashry, the former manager of Haras El Hodood football club.
- Afaf Shoeib, actress.
