= Marsa Matrouh =

City in Egypt

Marsa Matrouh مرسى مطروح
- City
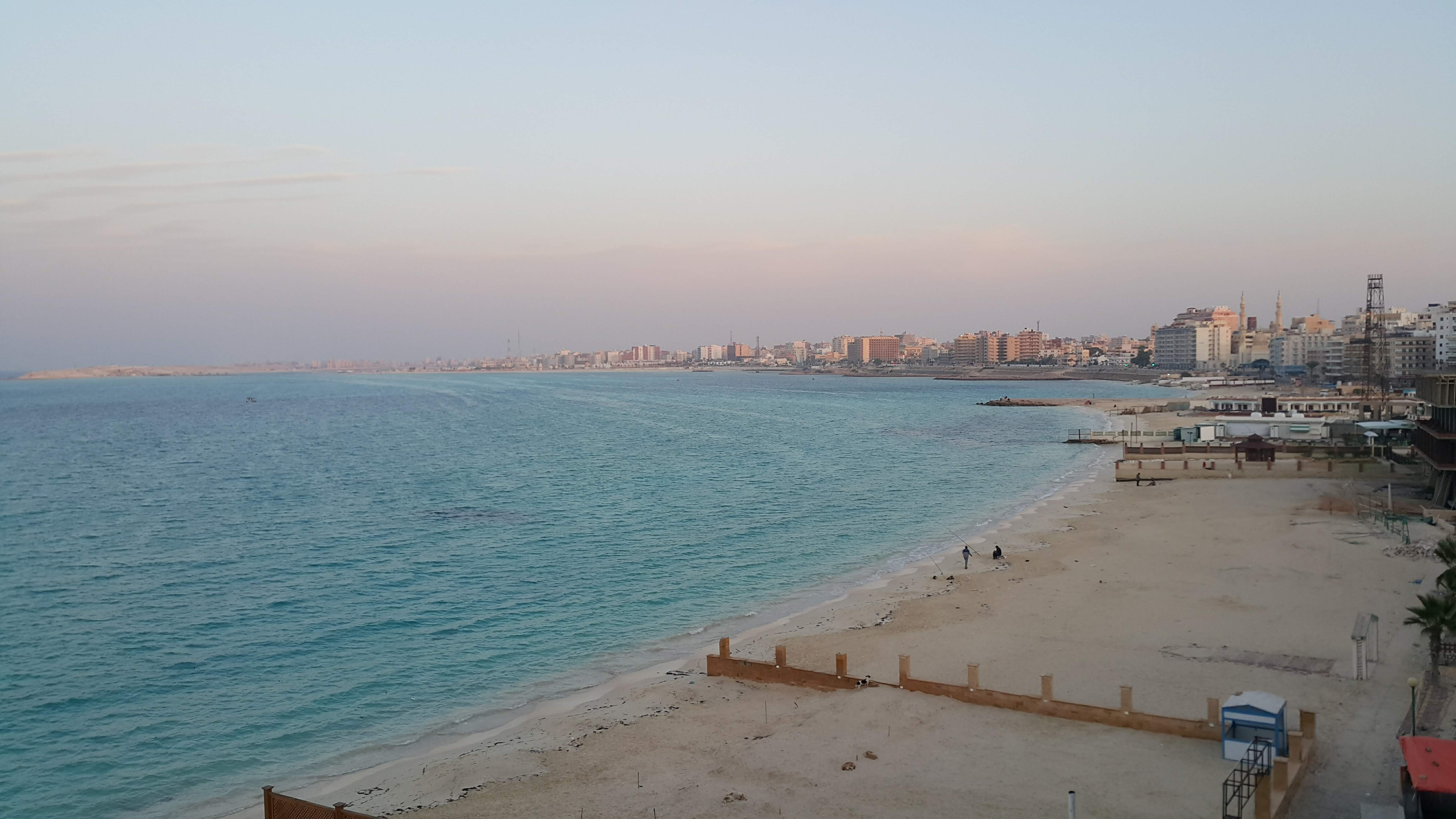
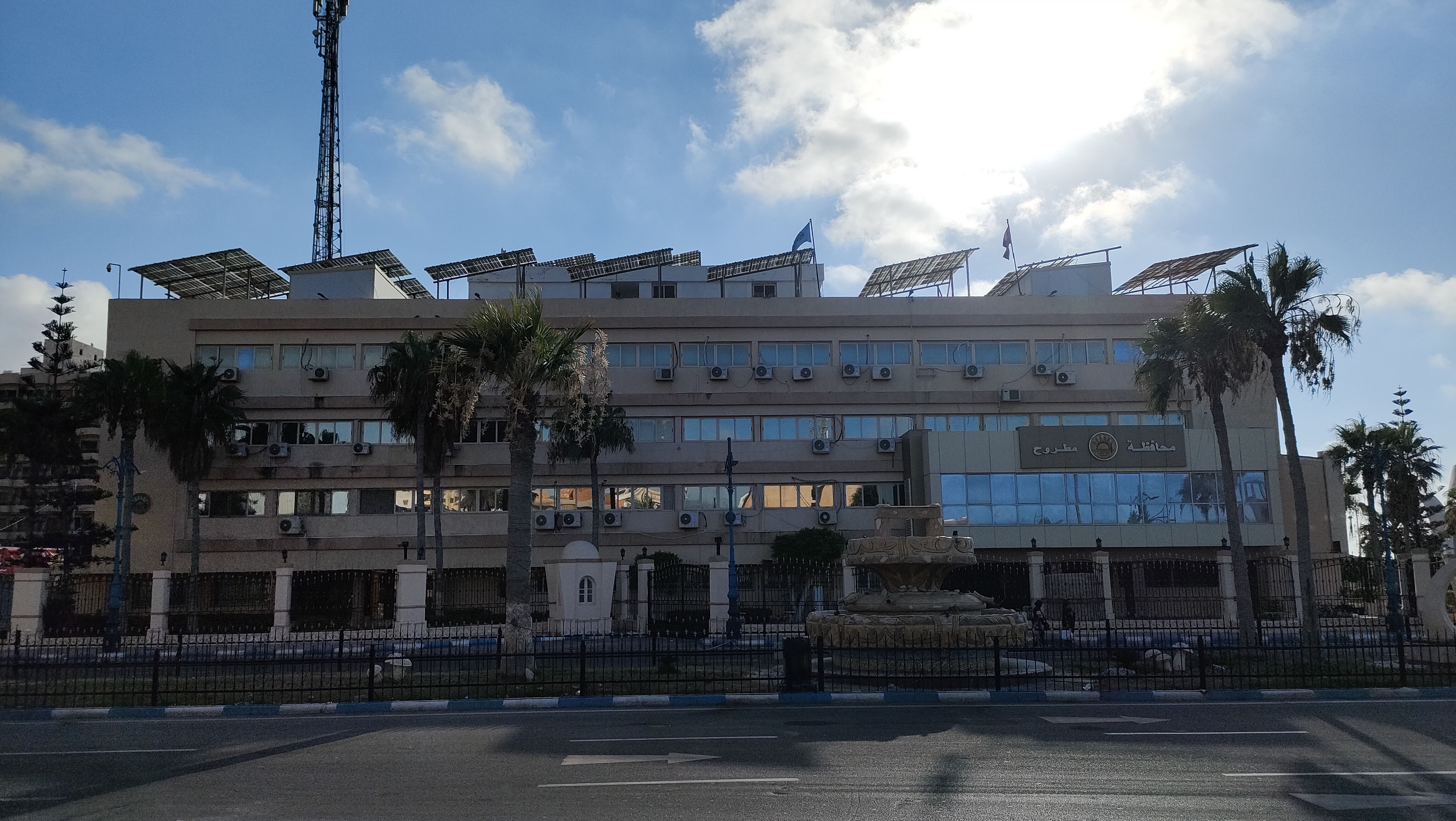
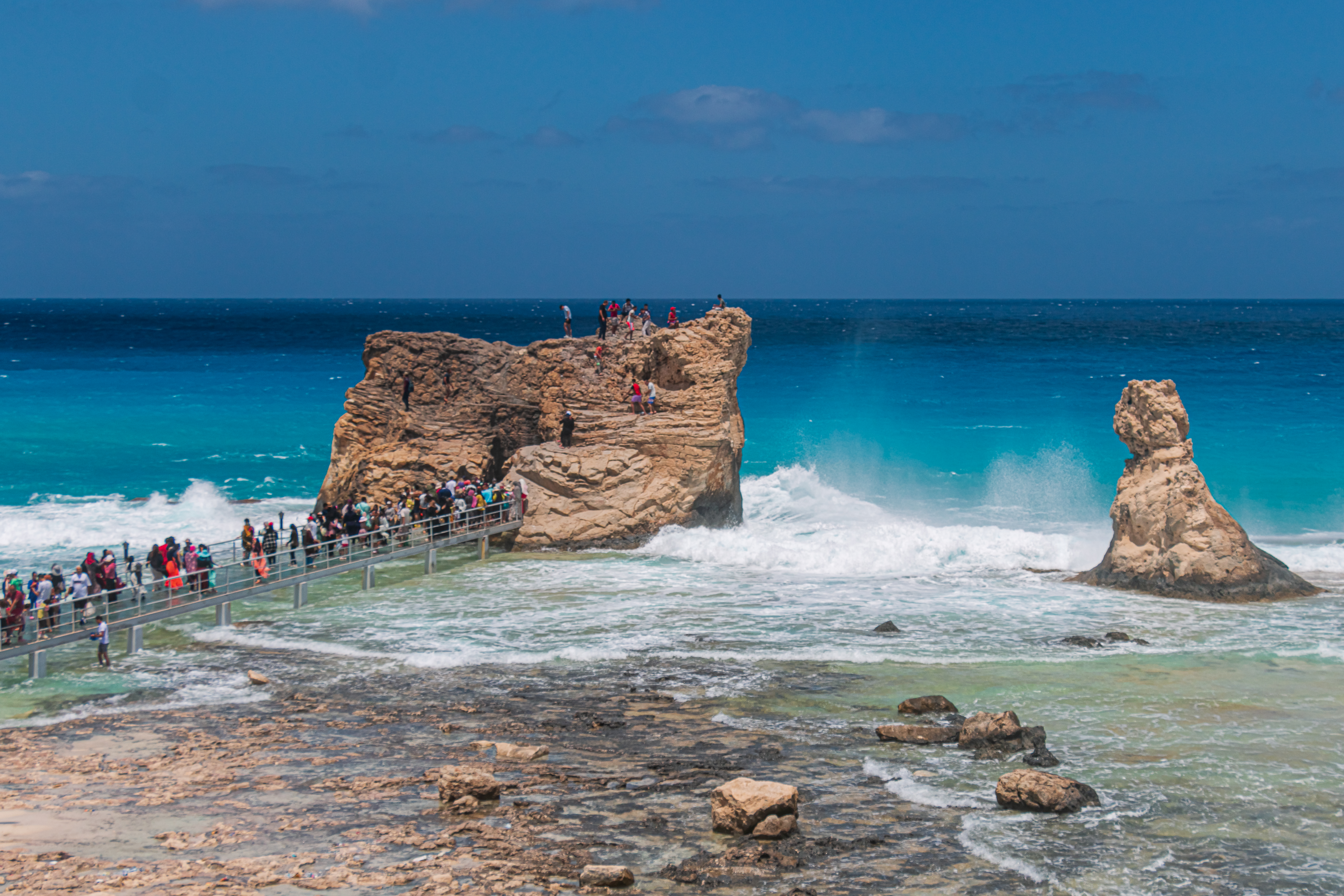
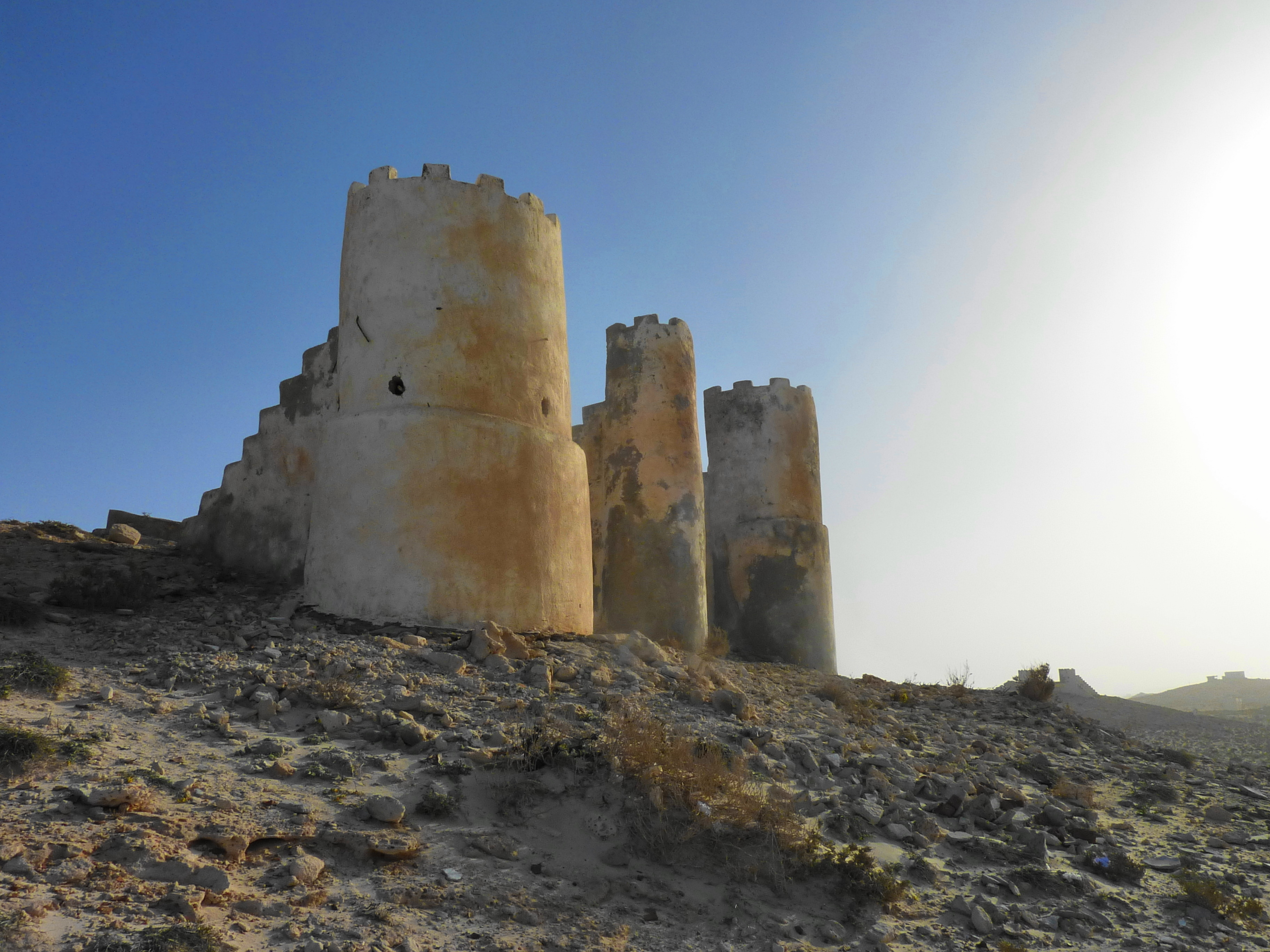
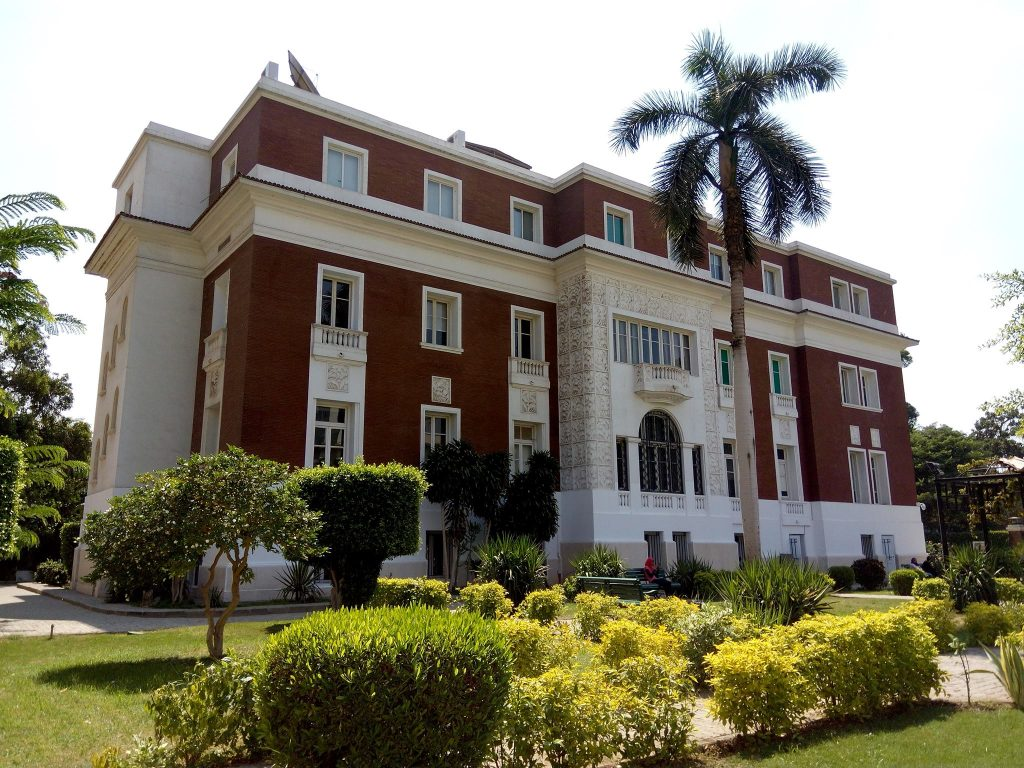
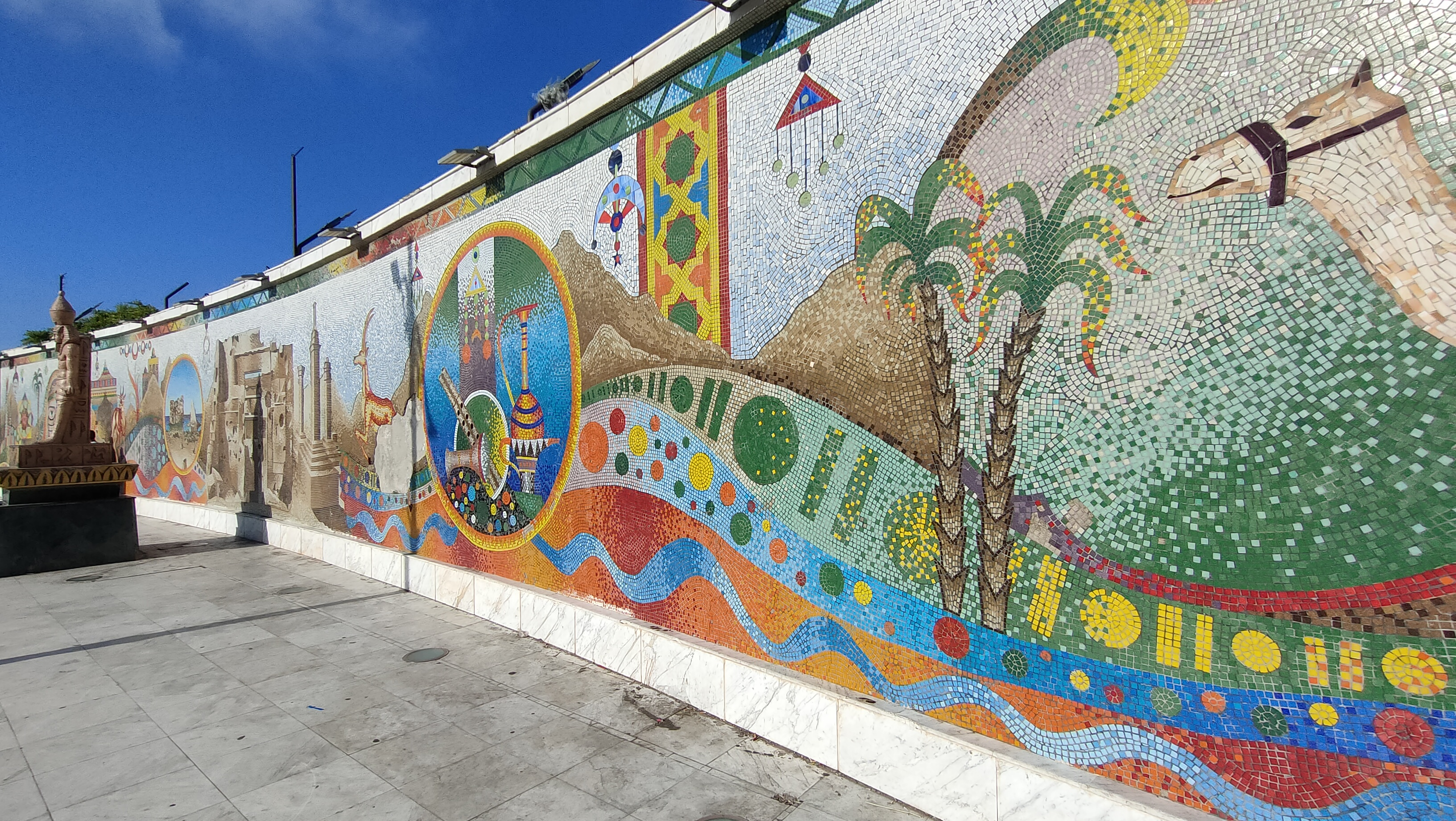
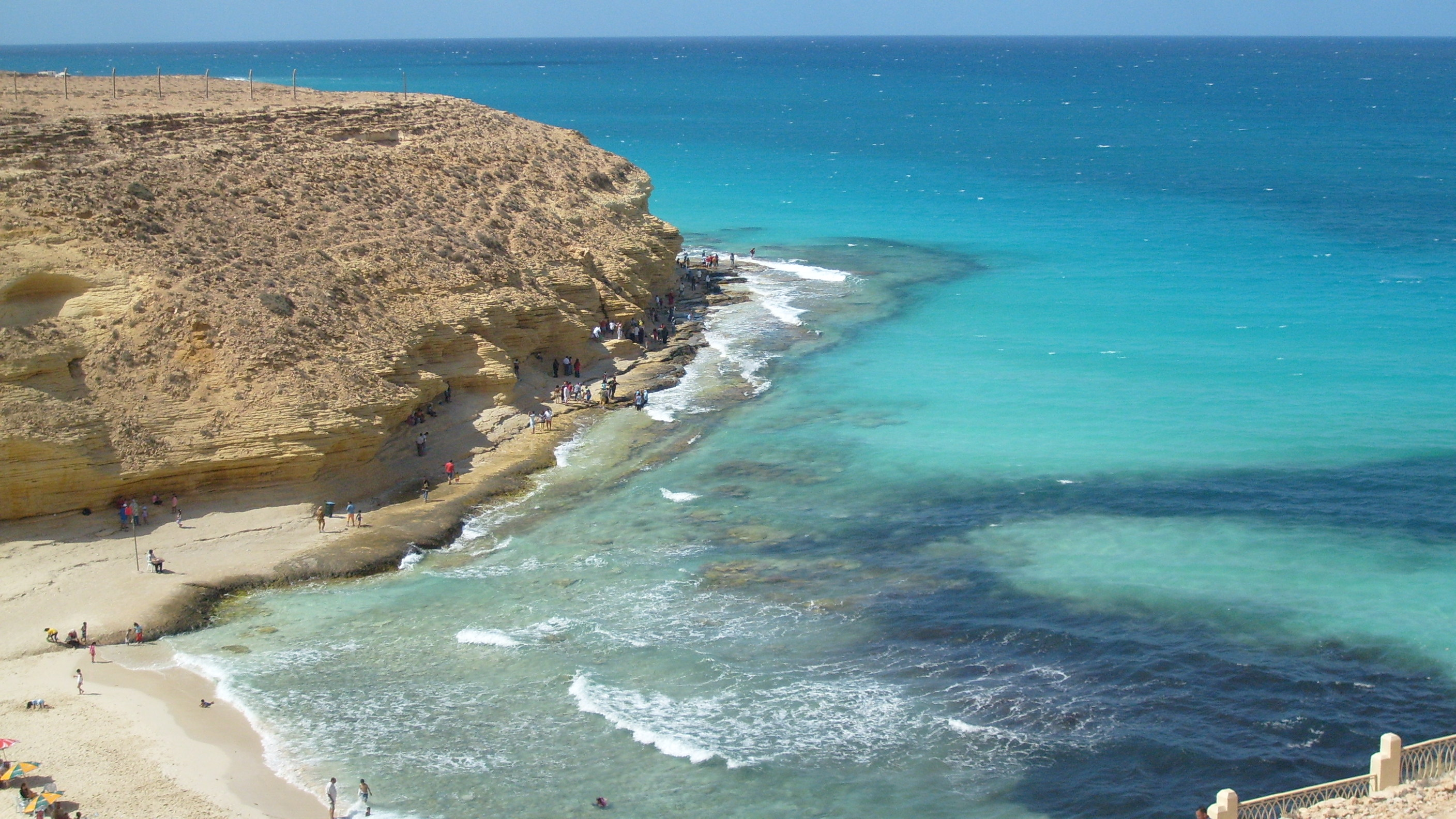
- View of the corniche City Hall Cleopatra's Bath Ancient ruins Misr Public Library City Arts Ageeba Beach

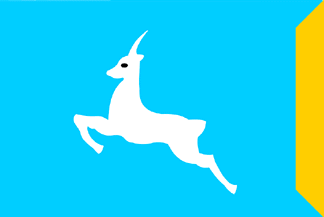
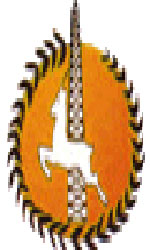
- Flag Seal

- Location in Egypt
- Coordinates: 31°20′N 27°13′E
- Country: Egypt
- Governorate: Matrouh

Area
  - Total: 2,675 km^{2} (1,033 sq mi)
- Elevation: 7 m (23 ft)

Population (2024)
  - Total: 241,625
  - Density: 90.33/km^{2} (233.9/sq mi)
  - Ethnicities: Egyptians Bedouins & Egyptian-Libyans.
- Time zone: UTC+2 (EET)
  - Summer (DST): UTC+3 (EEST)
- Area code: (+20) 46

Marsa Matrouh (Egyptian Arabic: مرسى مطروح, [ˈmæɾsæ mɑtˤˈɾuːħ]) is a port city and the capital of Matrouh Governorate in Egypt. It is located 240 km (150 mi) west of Alexandria and 222 km (138 mi) east of Sallum on the main highway from the Nile Delta to the Libyan border. The city is also accessible from the south via another highway running through the Western Desert towards Siwa Oasis and Bahariya Oasis.

Mersa Matruh was a major grain port under the Romans and a military base of the British Empire. During World War II, several battles were fought around its environs as the Italo-German Panzer Army Africa attempted to capture the port. It fell to the Axis during the Battle of Mersa Matruh but was recaptured following the Second Battle of El Alamein.

Mersa Matruh is served by Mersa Matruh International Airport. The city features soft white sand beaches and calm transparent waters; the bay is protected from the high seas by a series of rocks forming a natural breakwater, with a small opening to allow access for light vessels.

== History ==
=== Ancient Egypt and Roman ===
Mersa Matruh began as a small fishing town but was important enough to host an Egyptian temple under Ramesses II c. 1200 BC. It prospered as the port for the 8th-century BC oracle of Amun Ra at the Siwa Oasis.

It became known as Ammonia (Ancient Greek: Ἀμμωνία, Ammōnía) after the conquest of Egypt by Alexander the Great of Macedon in the 4th century BC. Under the Ptolemaic dynasty and Romans, it was also known as Paraetonium (Koine Greek: Παραιτόνιον, Paraitónion; Coptic: ⲧⲡⲁⲣⲁⲧⲟⲛⲓⲟⲛ, Tparatonion). It served as a major transit port for Egyptian grain to Rome. Ovid wrote that its patron goddess during his era was Isis.

The city was Christianised by the 6th century, when a chapel was built in the Byzantine style.

After the 7th-century Islamic conquest of Egypt by the Caliphate, it became known as Baritun (Arabic: البارتون, al-Bāritūn). The city also bore other names from at least the beginning of the 20th century: Berek Marsa, Port Mhaddra (Mithr), and Port Bardiah.

=== World War II ===
During World War II, the British Army's Baggush Box was located to the east of the city. Starting with the completion of an extension from the previous railhead at Fuka in February 1936, Mersa Matruh was the terminus for a single-track railway, which passed through El Alamein. Mersa Matruh served as a vital British military base during World War II and was a major objective of Erwin Rommel's Afrika Korps, which captured it during the Battle of Mersa Matruh.

=== 21st Century ===
During the Arab Spring in early 2011, protests broke out in the city. On the evening of 2 October 2023, during the lead-up to the 2023 Egyptian presidential election, a Nation's Future Party (Mostakbal El-Watan) rally in support of Abdel Fattah El-Sisi turned into anti-Sisi protests with protesters burning photos of El-Sisi and chanting slogans against him.

== Geography ==
=== Climate ===
Mersa Matruh has a dry-summer hot desert climate (BWhs) according to Köppen climate classification, but winds blowing from the Mediterranean Sea greatly moderate the temperature, making its summers moderately hot and humid while its winters are mild and moderately wet. Summers are sunny and see little rainfall, while in the colder months, there is some rain and cloud cover. Sleet and hail are common in winter.

Mersa Matruh and Port Said have the coolest summer days of all Egyptian cities and resorts, although not significantly cooler than other northern coastal places. Additionally Rafah, Alexandria, Abu Qir, Rosetta, Baltim, Kafr el-Dawwar and Mersa Matruh are the wettest in Egypt.

Climate data for Mersa Matruh (Marsa Matruh International Airport) 1991–2020 normals, extremes 1920–present
Month	Jan	Feb	Mar	Apr	May	Jun	Jul	Aug	Sep	Oct	Nov	Dec	Year
Record high °C (°F)	30.6 (87.1)	34.0 (93.2)	40.0 (104.0)	43.5 (110.3)	44.1 (111.4)	46.2 (115.2)	45.0 (113.0)	43.0 (109.4)	42.5 (108.5)	39.3 (102.7)	36.7 (98.1)	29.2 (84.6)	46.2 (115.2)
Mean daily maximum °C (°F)	18.1 (64.6)	18.7 (65.7)	20.5 (68.9)	23.2 (73.8)	25.7 (78.3)	28.2 (82.8)	29.9 (85.8)	30.5 (86.9)	29.7 (85.5)	27.3 (81.1)	23.5 (74.3)	19.7 (67.5)	24.5 (76.1)
Daily mean °C (°F)	13.5 (56.3)	14.0 (57.2)	15.7 (60.3)	18.1 (64.6)	20.9 (69.6)	24.1 (75.4)	26.1 (79.0)	26.7 (80.1)	25.6 (78.1)	23.0 (73.4)	18.9 (66.0)	15.2 (59.4)	20.2 (68.4)
Mean daily minimum °C (°F)	9.5 (49.1)	9.6 (49.3)	11.1 (52.0)	13.3 (55.9)	16.2 (61.2)	19.7 (67.5)	22.1 (71.8)	22.7 (72.9)	21.4 (70.5)	18.6 (65.5)	14.6 (58.3)	11.2 (52.2)	15.8 (60.4)
Record low °C (°F)	1.0 (33.8)	2.0 (35.6)	2.2 (36.0)	5.0 (41.0)	7.8 (46.0)	9.8 (49.6)	12.9 (55.2)	17.0 (62.6)	10.0 (50.0)	0.0 (32.0)	6.0 (42.8)	0.0 (32.0)	0.0 (32.0)
Average precipitation mm (inches)	35.8 (1.41)	21.2 (0.83)	7.9 (0.31)	3.0 (0.12)	1.5 (0.06)	0.2 (0.01)	0.1 (0.00)	0.2 (0.01)	0.6 (0.02)	9.3 (0.37)	21.4 (0.84)	32.4 (1.28)	132.9 (5.23)
Average precipitation days (≥ 1.0 mm)	5.7	4.9	1.7	1.0	0.5	0.6	0.0	0.0	0.2	1.3	2.5	4.6	23.0
Average relative humidity (%)	71	69	68	66	73	73	75	73	71	70	68	69	70.5
Average dew point °C (°F)	7.2 (45.0)	7.4 (45.3)	8.5 (47.3)	10.7 (51.3)	14.5 (58.1)	17.5 (63.5)	19.9 (67.8)	20.2 (68.4)	18.4 (65.1)	15.5 (59.9)	11.7 (53.1)	8.3 (46.9)	13.3 (55.9)
Mean monthly sunshine hours	196.3	214.5	254.1	269.1	316.7	355.4	371.9	356.3	309.2	268.2	222.2	196.6	3,330.5
Source 1: NOAA (humidity, dew point, sun 1961–1990)
Source 2: Meteo Climat (record temperatures)

Mersa Matruh mean sea temperature
Jan	Feb	Mar	Apr	May	Jun	Jul	Aug	Sep	Oct	Nov	Dec
18 °C (64 °F)	17 °C (63 °F)	17 °C (63 °F)	18 °C (64 °F)	20 °C (68 °F)	23 °C (73 °F)	25 °C (77 °F)	26 °C (79 °F)	26 °C (79 °F)	25 °C (77 °F)	22 °C (72 °F)	20 °C (68 °F)

== Main sights ==
=== Landmarks ===
- Ruins of the Temple of the King, Pharaoh Ramesses II (1200 BC)
- Drowned city of Caesar.
- Drowned Palace of Cleopatra.
- Egyptian Fleet Anchorage which was built by the Ptolemies. The remains of the naval installations still stand west of the port.
- Coptic Chapel: built in the early Coptic age, it contains several caves bearing inscriptions.
- Rommel's Hideout: a cave, hewn in the rock, where Rommel drew up plans for his military operations. It has now been turned into a military museum.
- The British Cemetery: thousands of rock-hewn tombstones stand in straight rows amidst a fenced garden.
- The German Cemetery: a fortress-like memorial that was built on a height overlooking the sea.
- The Italian Cemetery: a high tower fort standing on a high hill. The walls of the building are covered with marble.
- Matrouh Archaeology Museum

=== Main beaches ===
- Ageebah Beach: About 28 km west of Mersa Matruh downtown, distinguished by its numerous natural caves
- Al-Obayed Beach: About 20 km west of downtown Mersa Matruh
- Rommel Bay

== Photo gallery ==
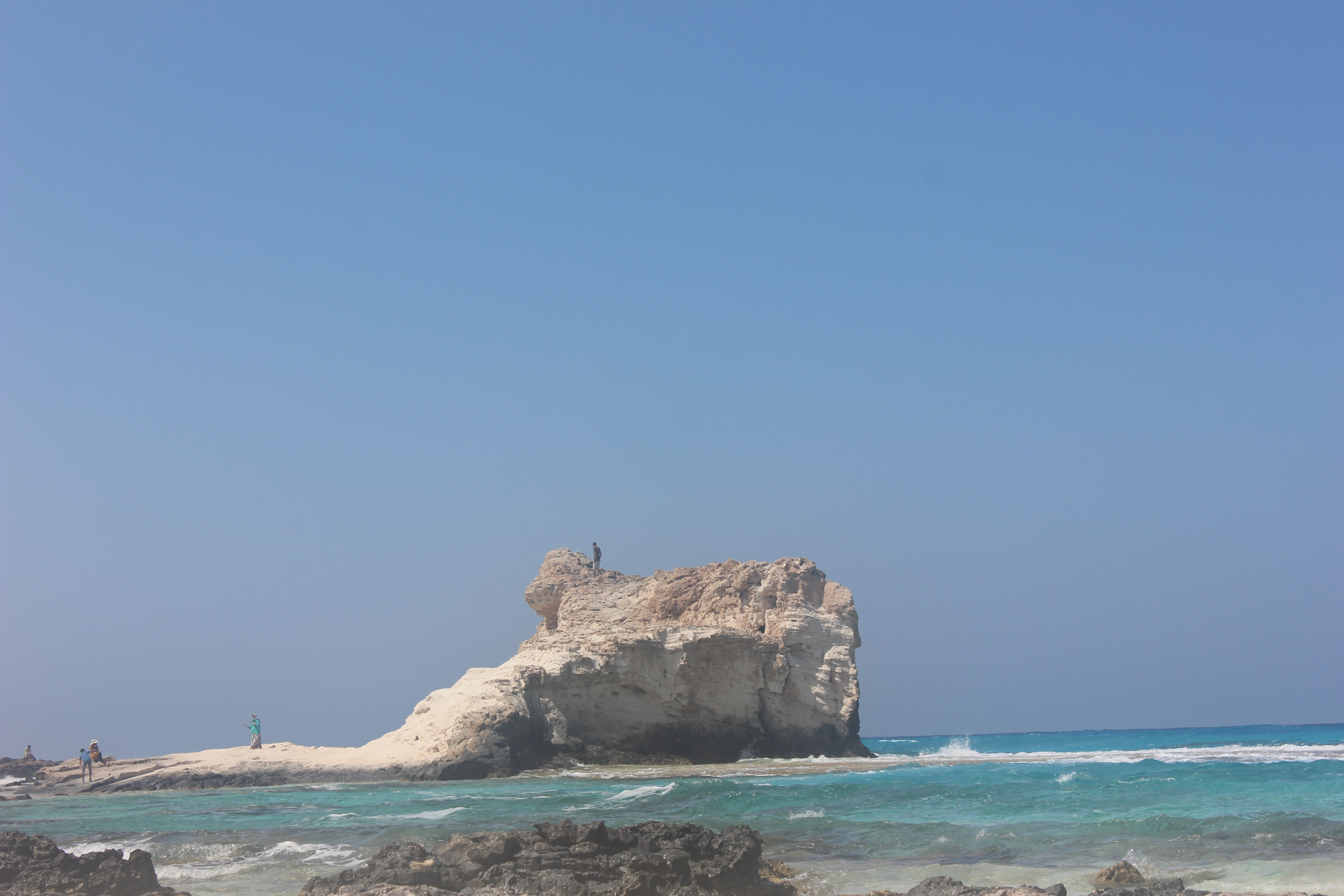
Cleopatra Bath

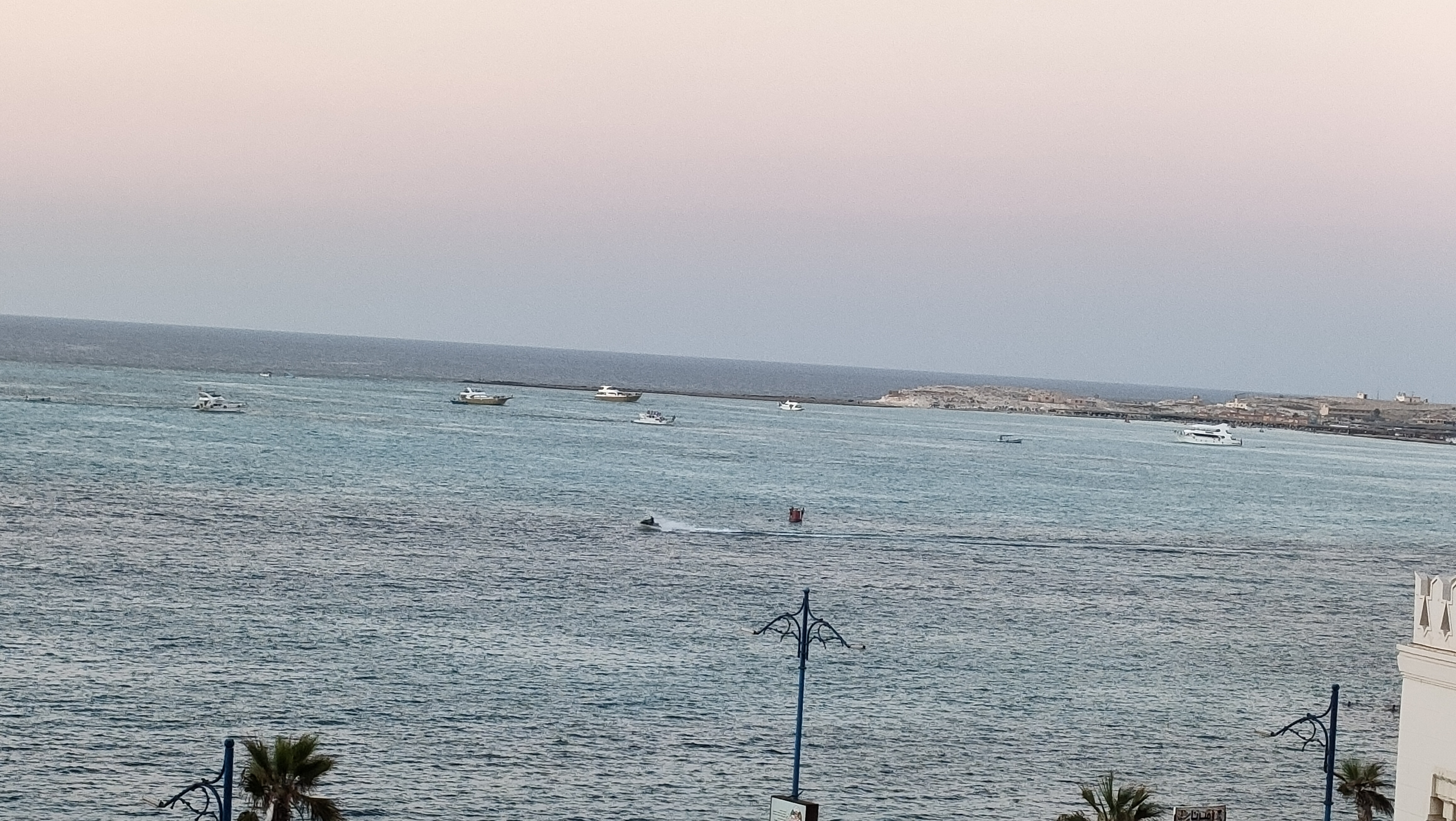
City beaches

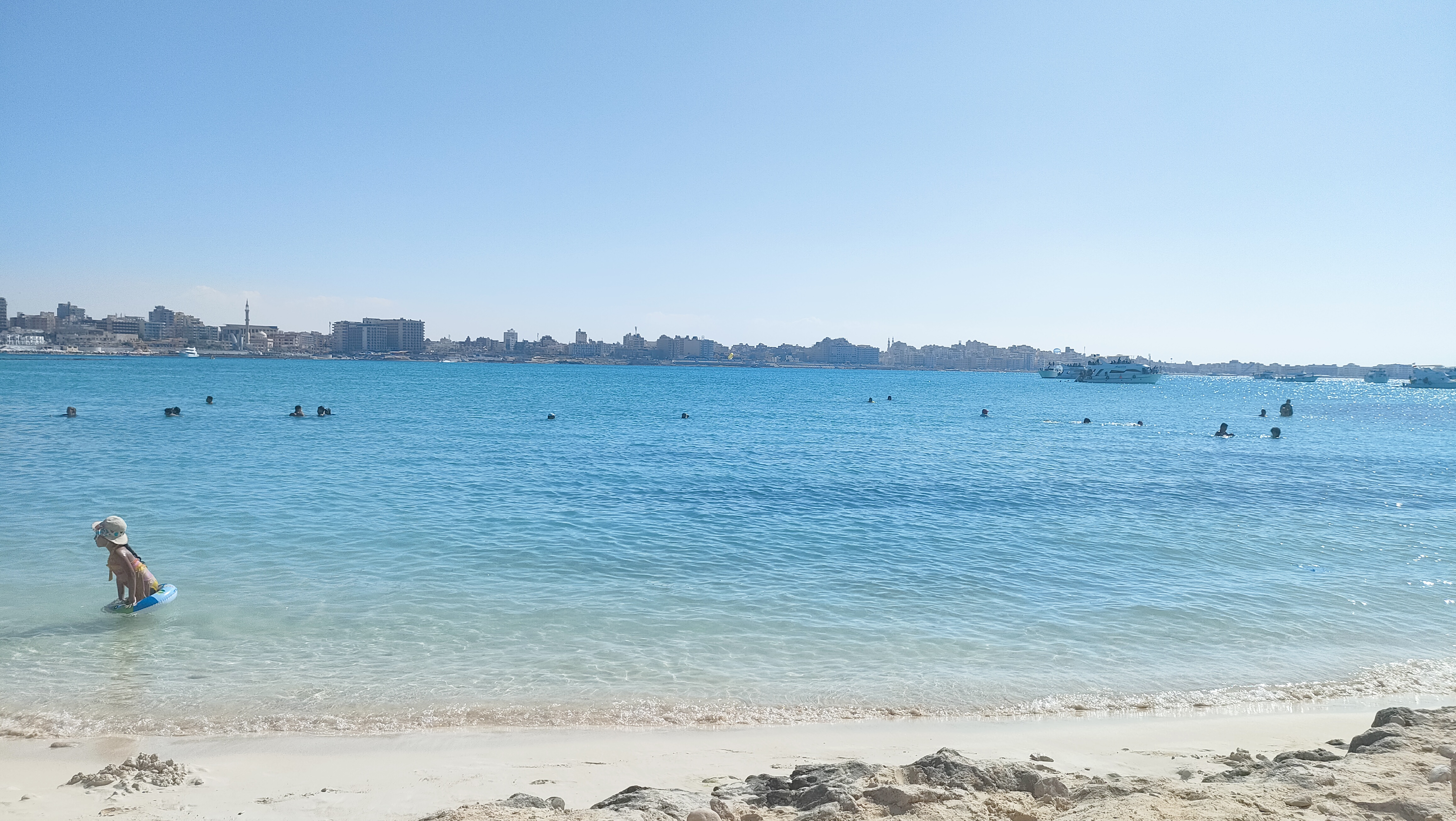
Rommel Beach

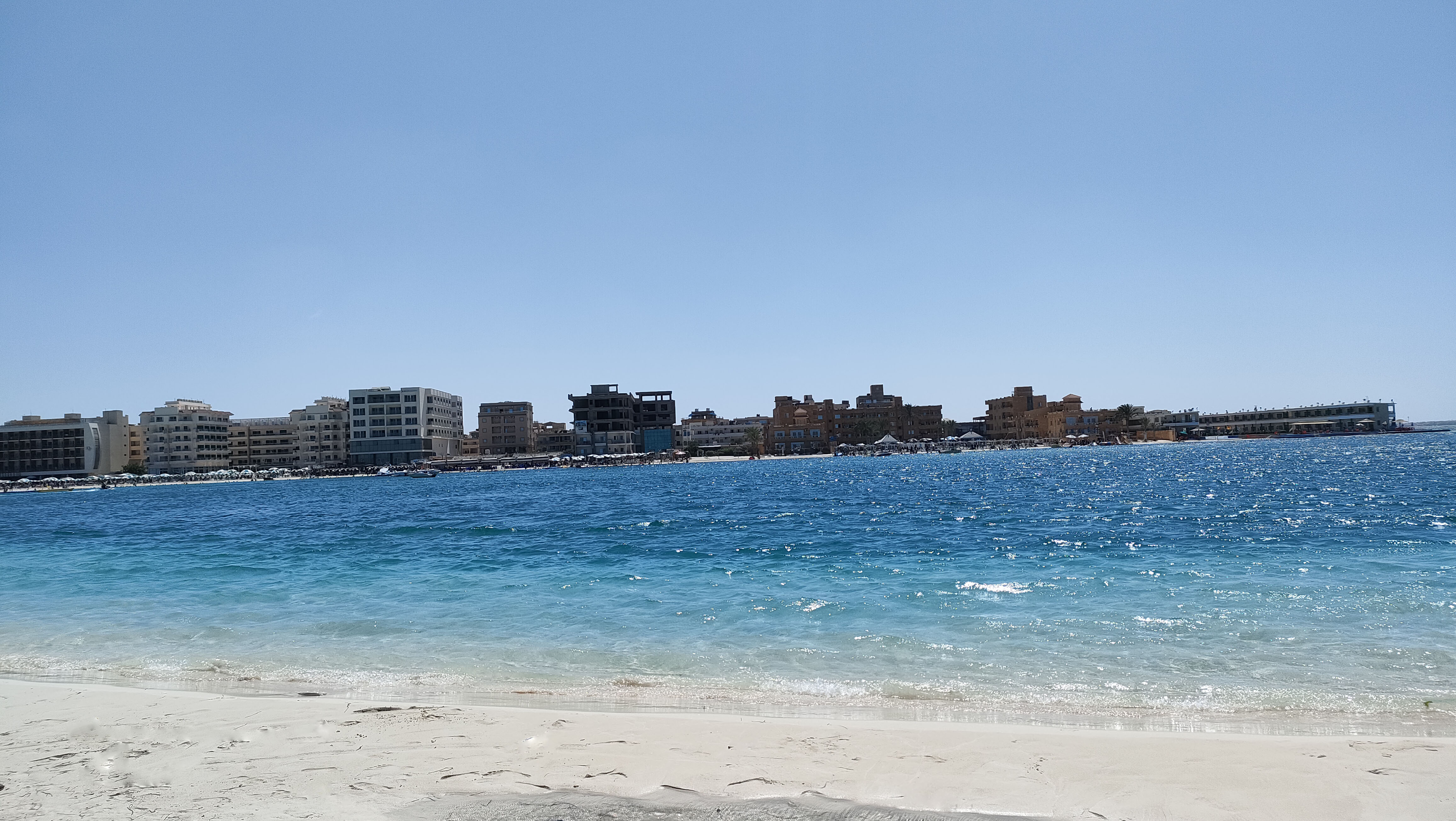
El Gharam Beach ("Love Beach") (1)

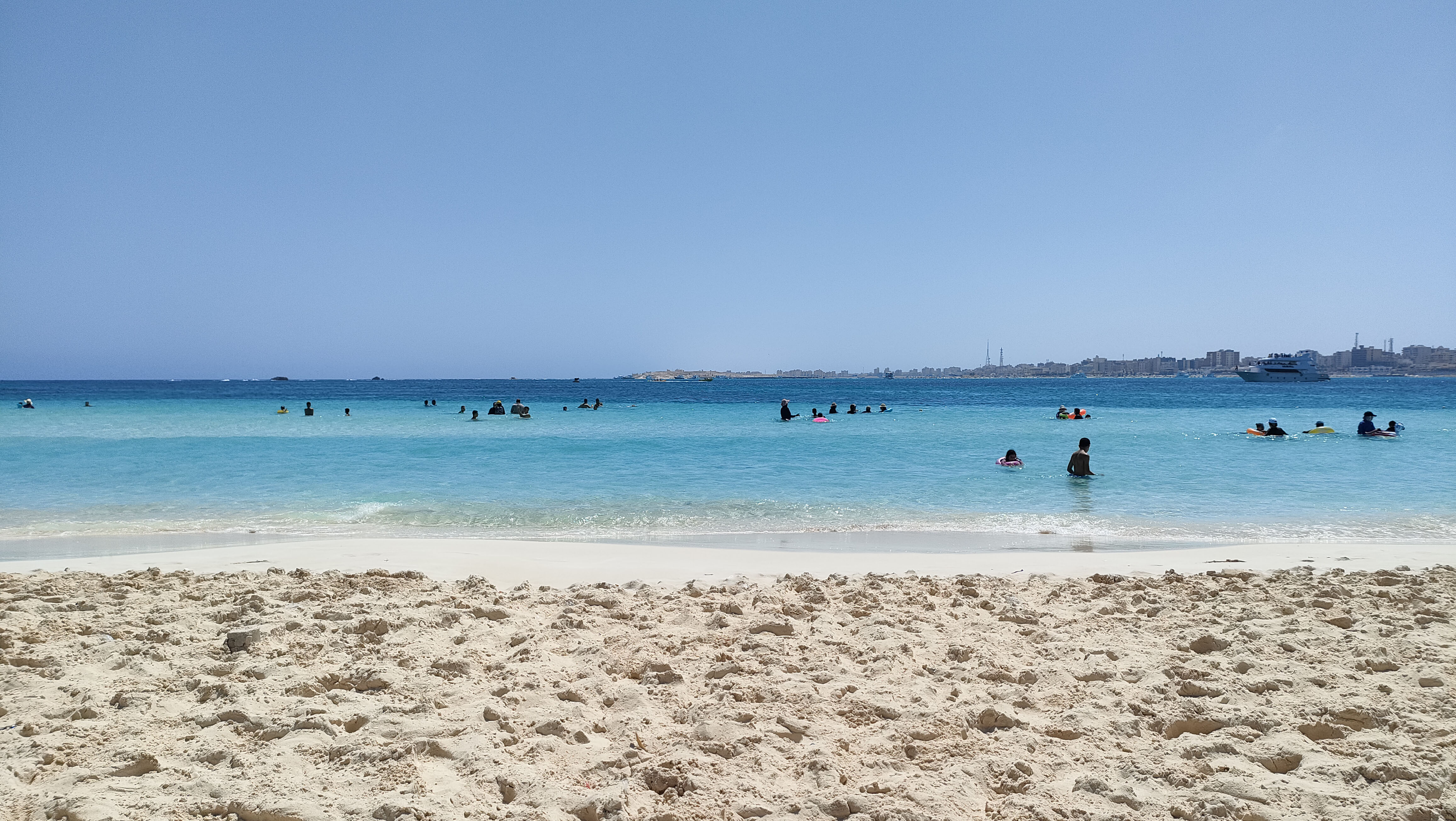
El Gharam Beach ("Love Beach") (2)

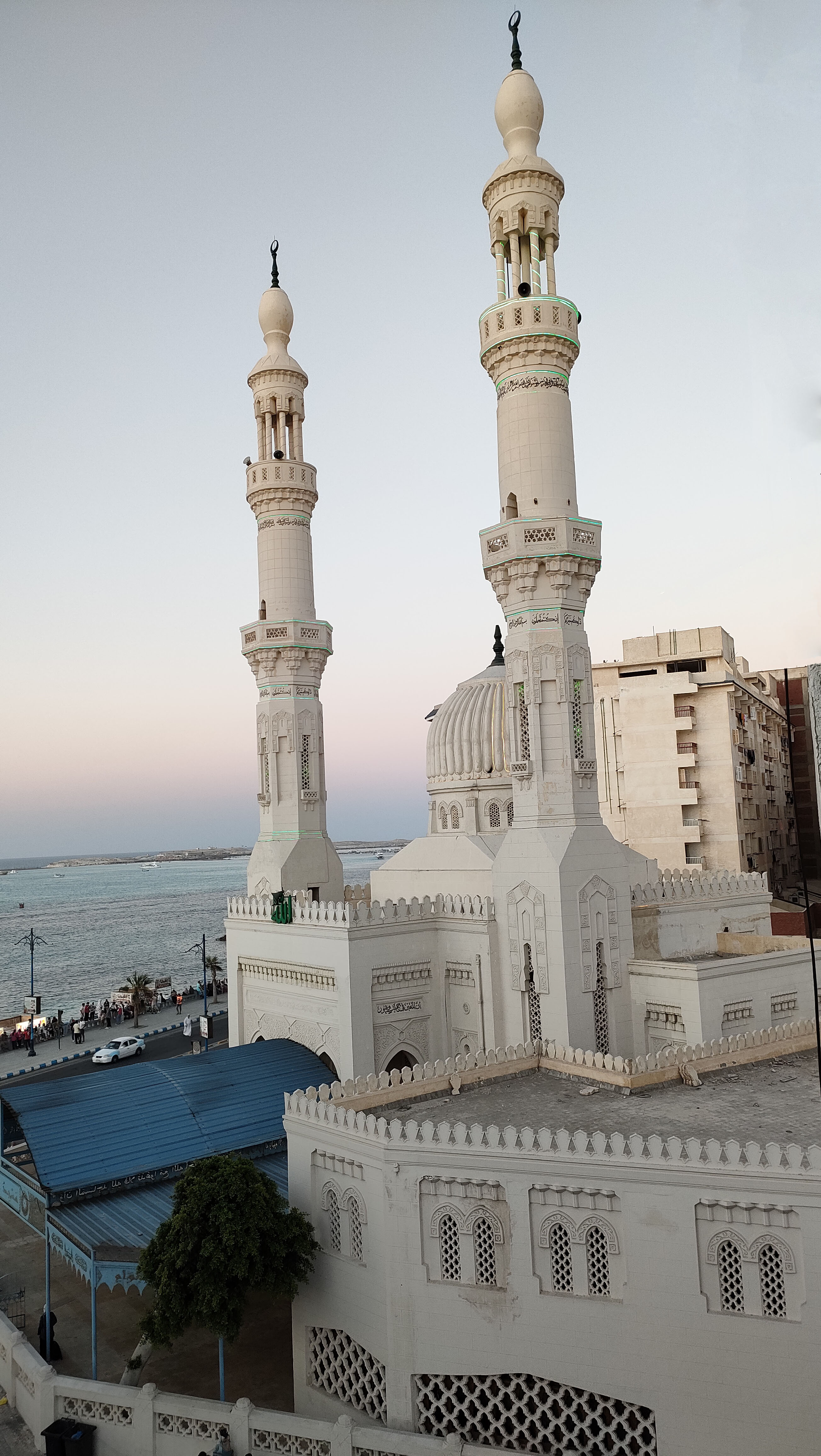
Al-Awam mosque

== See also ==
- List of cities and towns in Egypt
- Northern coast of Egypt

== Sources ==
- Playfair, Major-General I.S.O.; Molony, Brigadier C.J.C.; with Flynn, Captain F.C. (R.N.) & Gleave, Group Captain T.P. (2009) [1st. pub. HMSO:1954]. Butler, Sir James (ed.). The Mediterranean and Middle East, Volume I: The Early Successes Against Italy, to May 1941. History of the Second World War, United Kingdom Military Series. Uckfield, UK: Naval & Military Press. ISBN 978-1-84574-065-8.
