= Matrouh Archaeology Museum =

Archaeological museum in Matrouh, Egypt

- Coordinates: 31.3554°N 27.2393°E
- Collection size: 1,000

The Matrouh Archaeology Museum is an archaeology museum in Mersa Matruh, Matrouh Governorate, Egypt. The museum is located in two floors of the Misr Public Library. President El-Sisi inaugurated the museum on 1 March 2018.

It is the first archaeology museum in Matrouh Governorate.
