= Misr Spinning and Weaving Company =

Egyptian textile company

- Company type: State-owned enterprise
- Industry: Textile industry
- Founded: 1927
- Headquarters: El-Mahalla El-Kubra (Gharbia Governorate), Egypt
- Key people: Mohamed Moheb Salah Elden, (Chairman of the Board)
- Products: Thread, cloth, clothing
- Website: misrmehalla.com

The Misr Spinning and Weaving Company (Arabic: شركة مصر للغزل والنسيج) is a large textile company located in El-Mahalla El-Kubra within the Nile Delta of Egypt, approximately 80 kilometers north of Cairo. It is a state-owned enterprise held by the Holding Company for Cotton, Spinning, Weaving and Garments. Egypt's largest industrial facility employs over 25,000 workers, many of whom have played an active role in Egyptian labor struggles. Large protests and strikes at Misr Spinning and Weaving since 2006 contributed to the collapse of the Mubarak government, the 2011 Egyptian revolution, and the Arab Spring more generally.

== Development ==
=== Growth of the Egyptian cotton industry ===
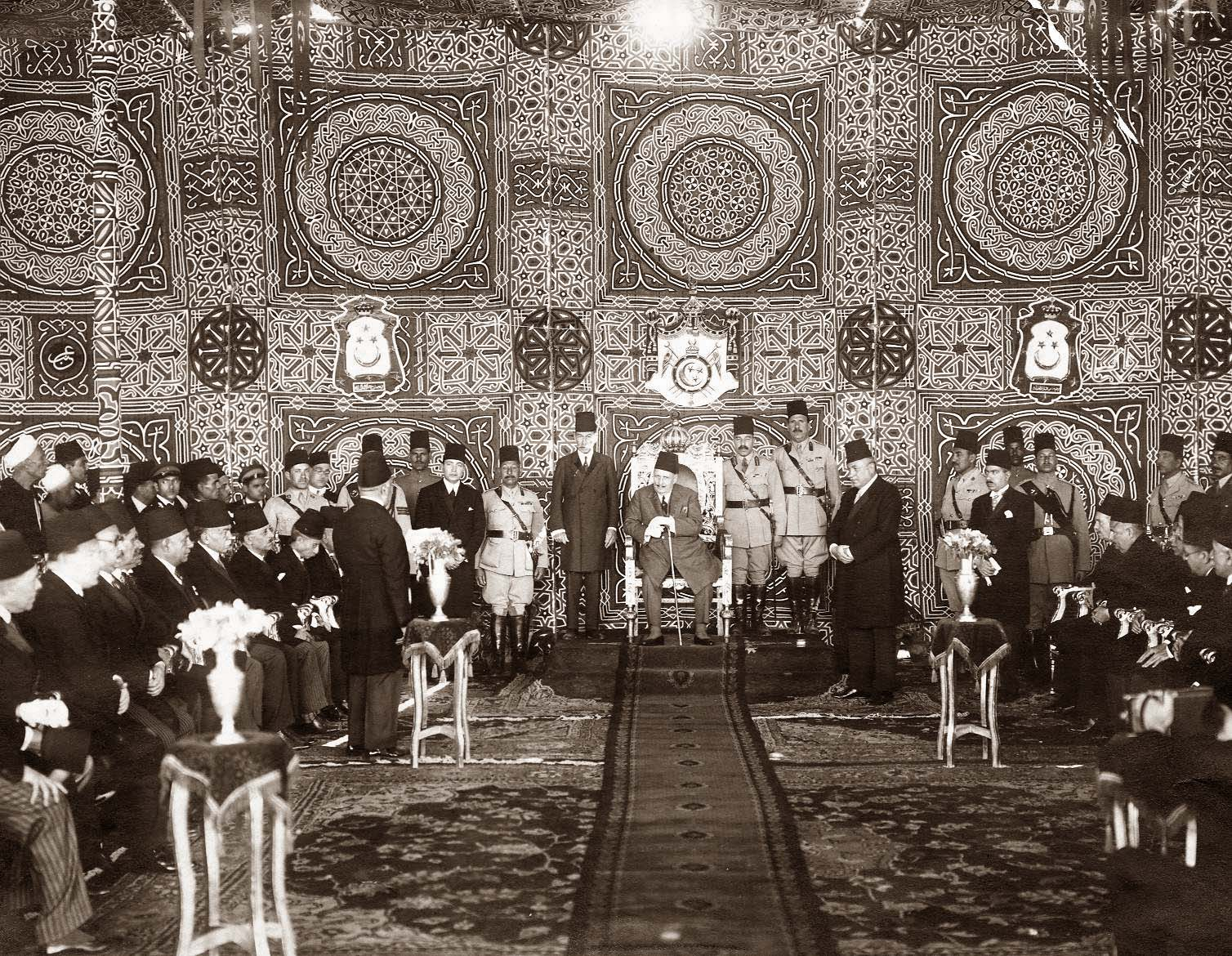
King Fouad I visits the Misr Spinning and Weaving Company, also known as Misr Helwan, in El-Mahalla El-Kubra, Egypt. The company owns the largest factory in Egypt, today employing over 25,000 workers.

The Misr Spinning and Weaving Company was founded in 1927 by a group of Egyptian businessmen in collaboration with the Misr Bank, facing Mahalla's Tal‘at Harb Square in El-Mahalla El-Kubra. The bank, which had formed during the Egyptian uprising of 1920 and proclaimed itself to be "an Egyptian Bank for Egyptians only," began providing capital for large-scale Egyptian industrial facilities and considered Misr Spinning and Weaving to be its flagship enterprise. Egyptian economist Talaat Harb was one of those who helped establish the firm. Misr Helwan was largely staffed by workers from peasant backgrounds, many of whom worked temporarily to save and return money to their families.

Long-staple cotton had been invented in Cairo in the 1820s, becoming a staple of the Egyptian economy in the 19th and 20th Centuries. Cotton production used 2.1 million acres for cultivation after the Second World War and by the 1980s represented the second largest export in Egypt, after crude oil. Cotton production in Egypt nevertheless declined after its post-WWII peak as arable land was converted to cereal or clover production, and previous importers including India achieved cotton self-sufficiency.

In 1960, Misr Helwan was the first firm to be nationalized by Gamal Abdel Nasser. It began to diversity its cotton sources and products, and in 1975 established a garment unit to complement its cloth manufactory. In 1976, the United States Agency for International Development contributed $96 million in loans to the Egyptian government, intended to help further modernize the Misr company. The loan caused controversy among American textile manufacturers, faced with losses as global textile markets expanded.

In the 1990s, solar heat increasingly used in dye and bleaching saved the textile company 11,000 barrels of oil annually, according to Egypt's New and Renewable Energy Authority. Efforts to private Misr Helwan, and Misr Fine Spinning and Weaving in Kafr el-Dawwar, were blocked by strike actions at both facilities.

=== Misr Helwan in the 21st century ===
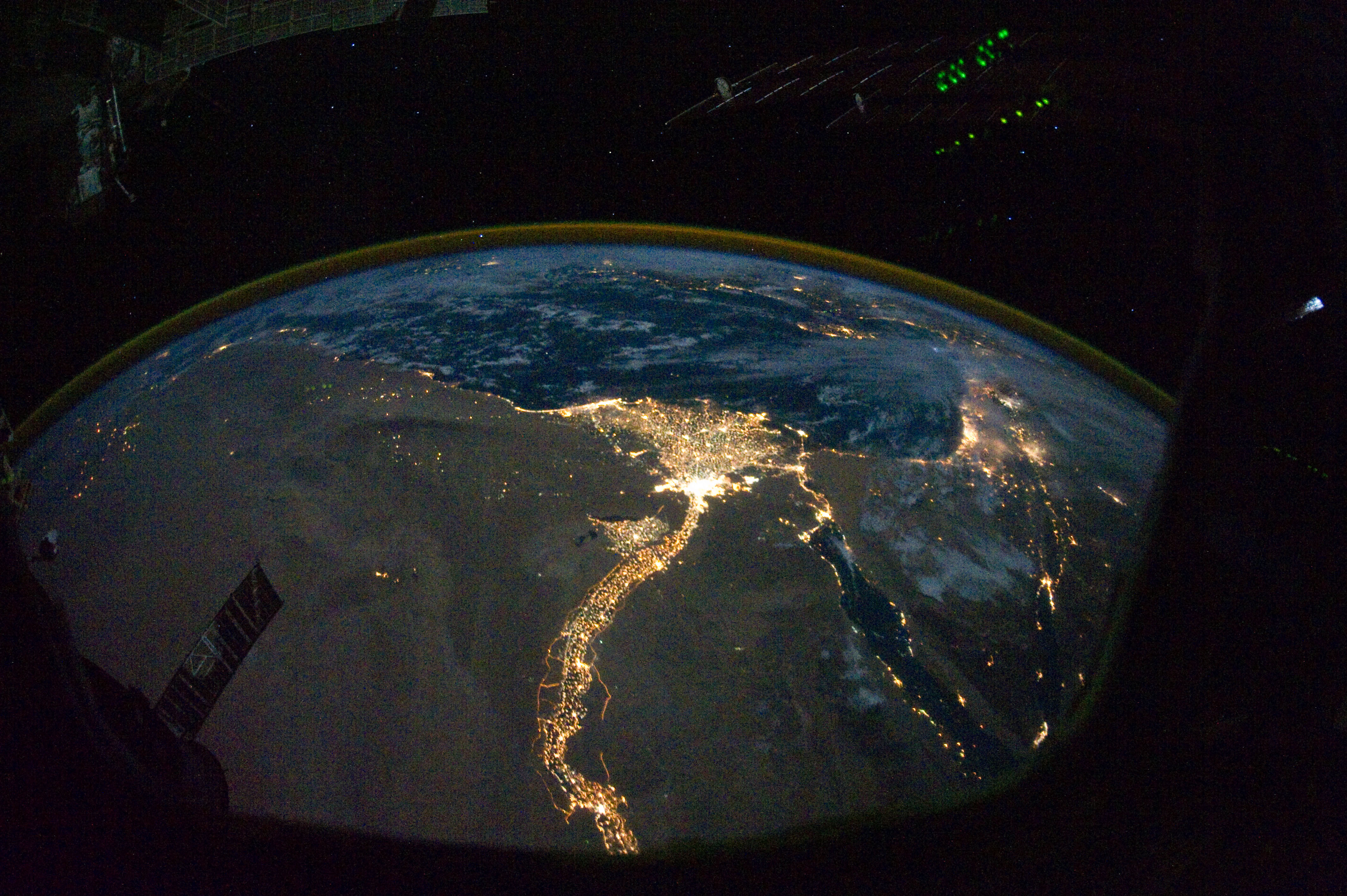
The Nile River Delta in 2010, Egypt's major population center, which includes the industrial city of El-Mahalla El-Kubra and Egypt's largest industrial facility, Misr Helwan.

In 2004, the company employed 23,000 workers and exported 46,000 tons of cotton yarn, 150 million square meters of fabric, and 5 million garments annually. In 2005, it employed 26,000 workers, and company facilities included 8 spinning mills, 10 weaving factories, processing units and labs, and recreational centers. The factory concentrated around the 20 percent of the whole labour force existing in the Egyptian public textile sector. The company remained nationalized despite largescale liberalization of other sectors of the Egyptian economy. After the 2008 financial crisis, Misr Helwan entered into $21 million in debt, which the Egyptian State News Service stated it was able to reduce to $16 million in debt the subsequent year through a debt settlement program.

Misr Helwan currently sells approximately 70% of its production to domestic markets, with the remaining production sold primarily to Europe.

== Early labor struggles ==
The earliest efforts to unionize Misr Helwan workers were led by the radical Abbas Halim, a member of the Muhammad Ali Dynasty and veteran of the German and Turkish armies during the First World War. While these efforts failed, Misr Helwan workers nevertheless organized strike activities themselves, demanding in July 1938 that they be granted eight-hour workdays, and in 1947 that they work under more lenient disciplinary rules. During the 1947 strike, the Egyptian government brought tanks into Mahalla, killing three workers and injuring 17 more. It was not until 1948 that workers achieved eight-hour days, following a government commission responding to strike pressure. Strikes were again suppressed by the army under Nasser in August 1952.

Due to low capital investment in Egypt's textile industry, the proportion of textile workers in Egypt's workforce began declining in 1960, and absolute numbers were declining by 1976. While wages initially increased following nationalization, wages began declining in the 1970s under Anwar al-Sadat. Following structural adjustments mandated by the World Bank during the 1990s, Egyptian textile manufacturing wages declined more precipitously, making them among the lowest of any textile manufacturers on earth as of the mid-2000s.

"They eat pigeons and chickens: we're tired of eating beans. And the beans are tired of us!"

— Misr Helwan workers describing disparities in living conditions during the strike of 1975.

In May 1975, workers from Misr Helwan, still the Middle East's largest spinning and weaving plant, demonstrated against high costs of living. Many workers were veterans of the 1973 Yom Kippur War and expected better treatment following their service in the Egyptian army. On 21 May Egyptian security forces killed one protester, injured others, and arrested 40–50; police requestioned two agricultural engineers who they alleged had incited workers to protest. The Misr Helwan workers earned $12.50 a week; Egyptian Interior Ministry officials stated that workers had burned cotton shipments and looted the homes of company executives. During this period, in order to organize labor activity, Misr Helwan workers created a political organization of several hundred members called Fagr (Dawn), and published a digest of the same name.

In September 1984 a sit-in strike at the Misr Company over government-mandated price increases and declining wages led to a general strike in El-Mahalla and surrounding towns. The strike forced Mubarak to return the cost of flat bread in working class districts to one penny, a subsidy then costing the government $400 million annually. Between 1986 and 1988, workers struck demanding an increase in wages from $26 to $30 monthly, and placed an image of Mubarak in a coffin outside the factory walls; government response was severe.

== 2004-9 strikes ==
In 2003, Egypt passed a Unified Labor Law effectively outlawing strikes, by prohibiting labor actions not authorized by the General Federation of Egyptian Trade Unions, itself run by the ruling National Democratic Party (NDP). Workers at Misr Helwan nevertheless struck on several occasions prior to the fall of the Mubarak government.

=== Low wages and rising food costs lead to strikes ===
A strike at Misr Helwan in December 2006 prompted a nationwide strike centered on pay, living conditions, and market reforms. Workers in March 2006 had made concessions to the management accepting 45 rather than 60 days of bonus pay, in exchange for profit sharing in the event of profits beyond an agreed upon threshold. Workers decided to return to strikes in December after Misr Helwan reported over $30 million in profits, while giving only 20 days bonus pay, less than agreed upon under any condition. The December 2006 strike was initiated when 3,000 female garment workers left their stations chanting "Here are the women! Where are the men?" prompting male workers to join them. Workers, initially surrounded and confronted by security forces, were joined by 20,000 additional workers, elementary school pupils, and students from Mahalla, forcing security forces to back down. Workers then demanded the impeachment of union officials.

From 2006 to 2007, while basic foodstuff prices increased by 48% and Misr Helwan reported profits of $120, many Misr workers were paid only $27 monthly, with some paid as little as $18 monthly. On 23 September 2007, approximately 20–27,000 workers from Misr went on strike, demanding higher pay and better working conditions. Workers and their families held rallies, threatened to create an independent administration, and demanded the resignation of Textile Holding Company head Mohsen al-Jilany, Misr Helwan chairman Mahmoud al-Gibali, and the dismissal of the workers' syndicate council head. They furthermore denied any relationship with the Muslim Brotherhood and stated that any implied links were intended to represent their fight over rights as a security risk. Government security forces surrounded and confined striking workers with their families, and arrested 5-8 trade unionists, accusing them of "unlawful gathering" and "destruction of public properties." According to government officials, police feared that the strike would spread to other major manufacturing centers throughout Egypt, as occurred in 2006. Misr Helwan spokesmen stated that the company suffered losses of $1.8 million on the first day of the strike. The company management reportedly refused negotiations with strikers in early days of the strike, and Egyptian Labour Minister Aisha Abdel Hadi, along with the government-controlled General Federation for Textile Workers, declared the strike illegal. The company subsequently promised to meet many of the workers' demands, ending the strike after one week.

=== Failed 6 April 2008 strike ===
Faced with municipal elections largely ignored by the population of Mahalla and still rising food prices, Misr Helwan workers promised to strike on 6 April 2008, demanding higher pay. but police response including arrests, occupation of Misr Helwan facilities and intimidation initially prevented them from doing so; a strike would have been illegal unless sanctioned by the ruling National Democratic Party. Nevertheless, Misr Halwan workers and others throughout El-Mahalla El-Kubra fought with police, set fire to schools, cars and tires, destroyed a portrait of Hosni Mubarak, and stormed the city hall. 300 people were injured in the first two days of rioting, and one youth fatally shot by police; two more later died as well. The Egyptian government offered concessions to Misr Helwan workers of 30 days bonus pay, and sent prime minister Ahmed Nazif to negotiate with them.

Among those arrested in the April strikes was Kareem el-Beheiri, a Misr Helwan worker and organizer of previous strikes, whose arrest sparked concern and condemnation from Reporters Without Borders. Later released by Egyptian authorities, el-Beheiri and fellow Misr Helwan workers Tarek Amin and Kamal al-Fayoumy told the Agence France Presse that they had been subjected to beatings, electric shocks and starvation during their 76 days of confinement. Police reportedly sought to block the publicizing of workers conditions and planned protests via blogs and Facebook groups, and arrested Ahmed Maher after he created the Facebook "6 April" group supporting the Misr Helwan workers.

In September 2009, 1,500 Misr Helwan workers demanding unpaid wages went on strike and took company executives hostage.

== Strikes during and after the Egyptian Revolution ==
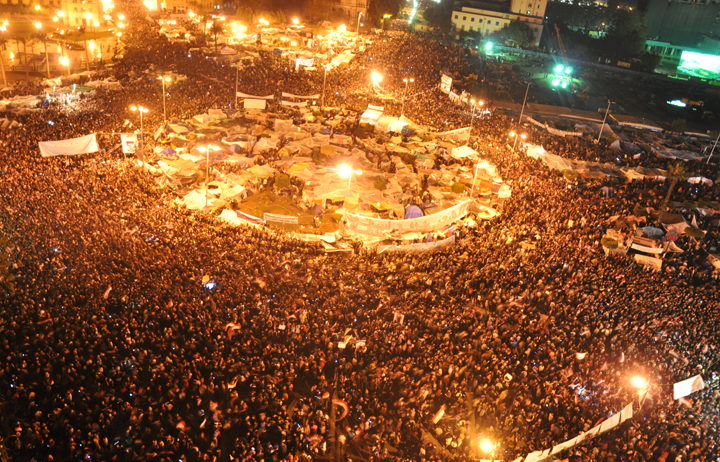
Protesters on 10 February 2011 in Cairo's Tahrir Square. Misr Helwan workers struck in solidarity with the pro-democracy protests and continued their strike after Mubarak's fall, demanding higher wages.

=== Collapse of the Mubarak government ===
In February 2011 Misr Helwan workers closed the factory and went on strike in solidarity with protestors in Tahrir Square. After the fall of Mubarak's government, Misr Helwan workers briefly ceased but then continued strike action, demanding higher wages. Workers also demanded the replacement of company officials, as the Egyptian Supreme Council for the Armed Forces called on the workers to return to work. With a tank stationed outside the company's main gate, workers also called for reforms within the country's military.

"We are in a revolution, and the revolution, as they say, cleaned out the corrupt leaders."

— Faisal Naousha, leader of February 2011 strikes at Misr Helwan, explaining workers' continued pressure for reform and improved wages.

Misr Helwan workers also demanded the resignation of the state-controlled Egyptian Trade Union Federation leadership. The Supreme Council of the Armed Forces threatened strikers, declaring that the military "will not allow the continuation of these illegal acts which pose a danger to the nation, and they will confront them.". Following threats, the military acceded to strike demands and Misr Helwan workers returned to the factory.

=== Subsequent strikes ===
On 15 July 2012, American Secretary of State Hillary Clinton met with Egyptian Field Marshal Mohamed Hussein Tantawi and praised the Supreme Council of the Armed Forces for "representing the Egyptian people in the revolution." On the same day, 25,000 workers from Misr Helwan went on strike demanding increased profit sharing, better retirement benefits and a replacement of the management. Some strikers argued that the revolution had not materially benefitted Misr Helwan workers, and had rather promoted "corrupt" officials such as Fouad Abd-al-Alim. The Misr workers were joined by workers from seven other textile factories in the region, and strikes also broke out among doctors and health workers, university workers, and ceramics workers in other parts of Egypt. Workers suspended their strike on 24 July, having seen only some of their demands met, and promised to strike again in September unless further concessions were made.

=== Declaration of independence from the "Muslim Brotherhood State" ===
Violent clashes broke out in Mahalla on 27 November 2012, over the constitution proposed by the Muslim Brotherhood; some Misr Helwan workers participating in the protest stated that they did not participate in an attack on the Muslim Brotherhood's Freedom and Justice Party headquarters. On 7 December protesters in El-Mahalla El-Kubra stormed the city hall and declared independence from the "Muslim Brotherhood State." One Misr Helwan worker, arrested on previous occasions by the Mubarak government, explained workers' attitudes to the Muslim brotherhood:

The revolution's slogan was "Justice, bread and freedom," but we've obtained none of these. The government just increased the price of electricity by 15% while our wages have stagnated. They're now trying to impose a discriminatory constitution, written for and by Islamists. The Muslim Brotherhood doesn't represent me... they take with one hand what they pretend to give with the other. They're even worse than Mubarak."

Other protestors noted that Misr Helwan workers could launch a general strike, slowing or crippling the national economy. One worker speaking to Al-Ahram criticized the constitution, stating that article 14 tied wages to production and not food prices. Voting in Mahalla was largely peaceful on the day of the election.

=== Reign of Abdel Fattah el-Sisi ===
After the overthrow of Egyptian president Mohamed Morsi by general Abdel Fattah el-Sisi in the 2013 Egyptian coup d'état, the Egyptian government passed laws raising the minimum wage to 1,200 EGP per month. In February 2014, 13,000 Misr Helwan workers, some earning only 500 EGP per month, began a sit-down strike demanding the implementation of minimum wages. Workers also demanded unpaid bonuses. In April Egypt's Higher Administrative Court ruled that public sector employees who strike can be prosecuted, prompting clashes between Misr Helwan workers and Egyptian security forces. In June, the Sisi government called on workers to stop all strikes, and increase productivity. Some Misr Helwan workers stated that mismanagement had brought productivity to 50% of capacity through failure to provide adequate raw materials for production. Misr Helwan employees stated that their wages still remained below minimum wage.

In October 2015 Egyptian authorities declared that they would no longer provide promised and as-yet unpaid bonuses to employees, prompting another strike by 17,000 Misr Helwan workers, soon joined by workers in associated industries. The bonuses were meant to help with surging inflation. In response to the strike Egyptian labor minister Gamal Sorour threatened workers with prosecution "against any attempts to obstruct work." A labor rights director in Egypt stated that the Egyptian government canceled bonuses in an effort to reduce pay to all public sector employees except those in the Interior Ministry, armed forces, judiciary and banks. According to another analyst, the Egyptian government was allowing the workforce to shrink and lowering payroll costs to privatize the company. When workers ignored the ultimatum, the government announced it would extend bonuses to some workers, but not to those at Misr Helwan, unless the company regained profits lost in the strike. When workers remained on strike, the government promised they would extend bonuses to Misr Helwan employees as well, ending the strike. The company announced however that it would deduct 11 days of wages from salaries in retaliation for the strike.

In 2015, Egyptian Sumo wrestler and Misr Helwan employee, Ramy Abd El Aty Ibrahim Belalal-Gazzar, became the world Sumo wrestling champion at the annual US Sumo Open. Gazzar is a maintenance worker at the company and also coaches its Judo team.

== Significance ==
"This is a city within a city; a microcosm of Egypt."

— Al Jazeera, reporting on Misr Helwan's contribution to the 2011 Egyptian Revolution.

The Misr Spinning and Weaving Company is considered Egypt's largest company and industrial facility; 48% of Egypt's economy involves the textile industry. Since its creation in 1927 and through successive stages of development and governance, Misr Helwan has been considered at the forefront not only of Egypt's industrial development but also its political and labor activity. Al Jazeera has called the factory "a microcosm of Egyptian society."

Textile workers at Misr Helwan and at other facilities in Kafr el-Dawwar, Qalyub, Helwan and Shubra al-Khayma played major roles in nationwide Egyptian strike actions beginning in 1977, with the U.S.-backed liberalization of the Egyptian economy. Resisting nationwide trends, workers at Misr Helwan rejected privatization in Mahalla and encouraged workers at other public facilities to do the same.

The company's failed 6 April 2008 strike inspired Egypt's April 6 Youth Movement that ultimately played a significant role in Egypt's Arab Spring and the collapse of the Mubarak government. Writing for The Majalla, Paula Mejia has written that Misr Helwan's strikes "not only voiced the grievances of many Egyptians, but they also provided them with a solution: collective action for government response."

Misr Helwan workers considered themselves to be at the vanguard of the 2011 Egyptian Revolution, and continued to fight for improved working conditions after Mubarak's fall. The World Socialist Web Site has argued that the strike called by Misr Helwan workers in the early days of February 2011 prevented further compromise between government and opposition groups, contributing to Mubarak's departure.

== See also ==
- El-Mahalla El-Kubra
- Arab Spring
- April 6 Youth Movement
