= El Mahalla El Kubra =

El Mahalla ϯϣⲁⲓⲣⲓ
- City
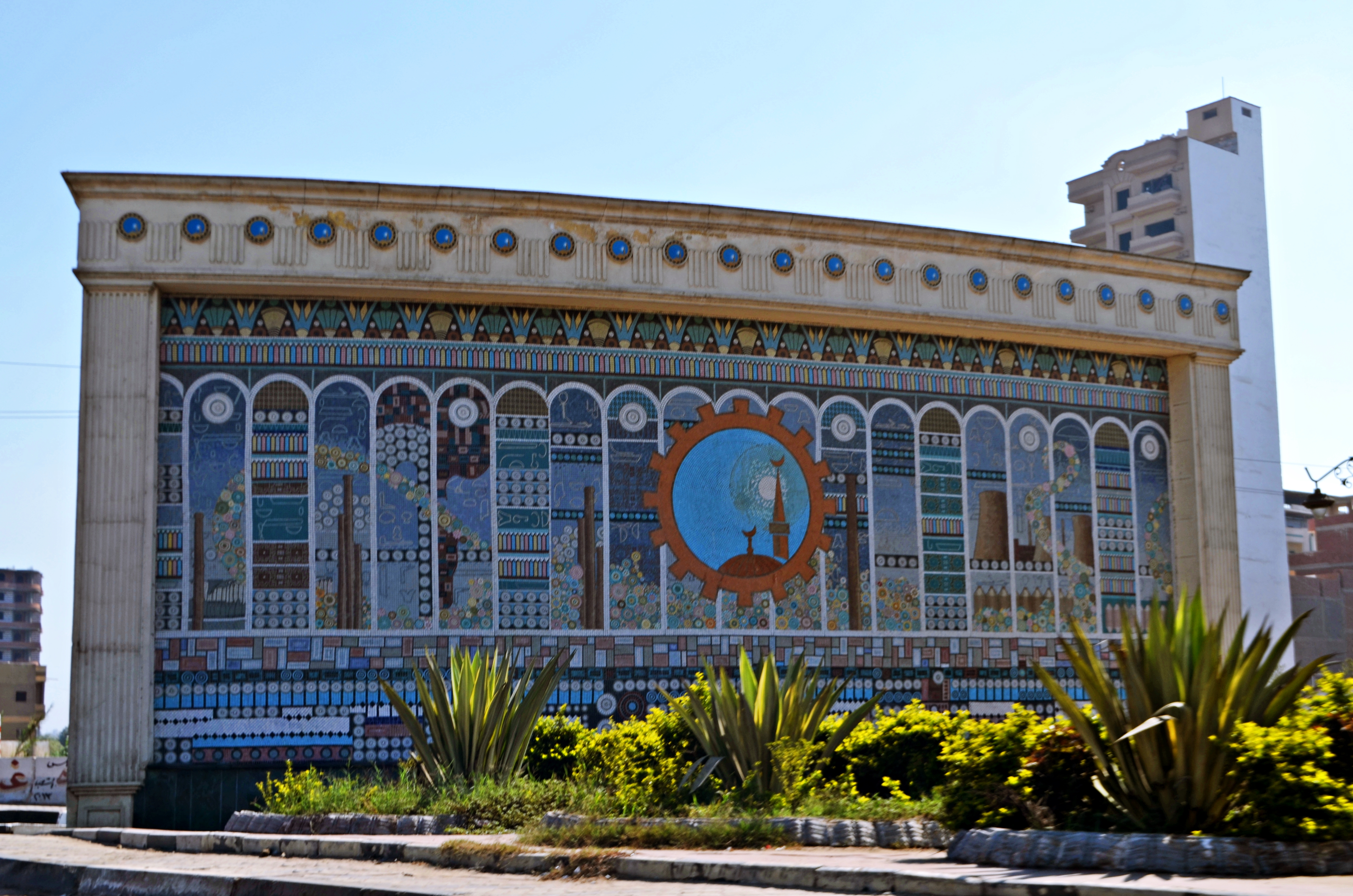
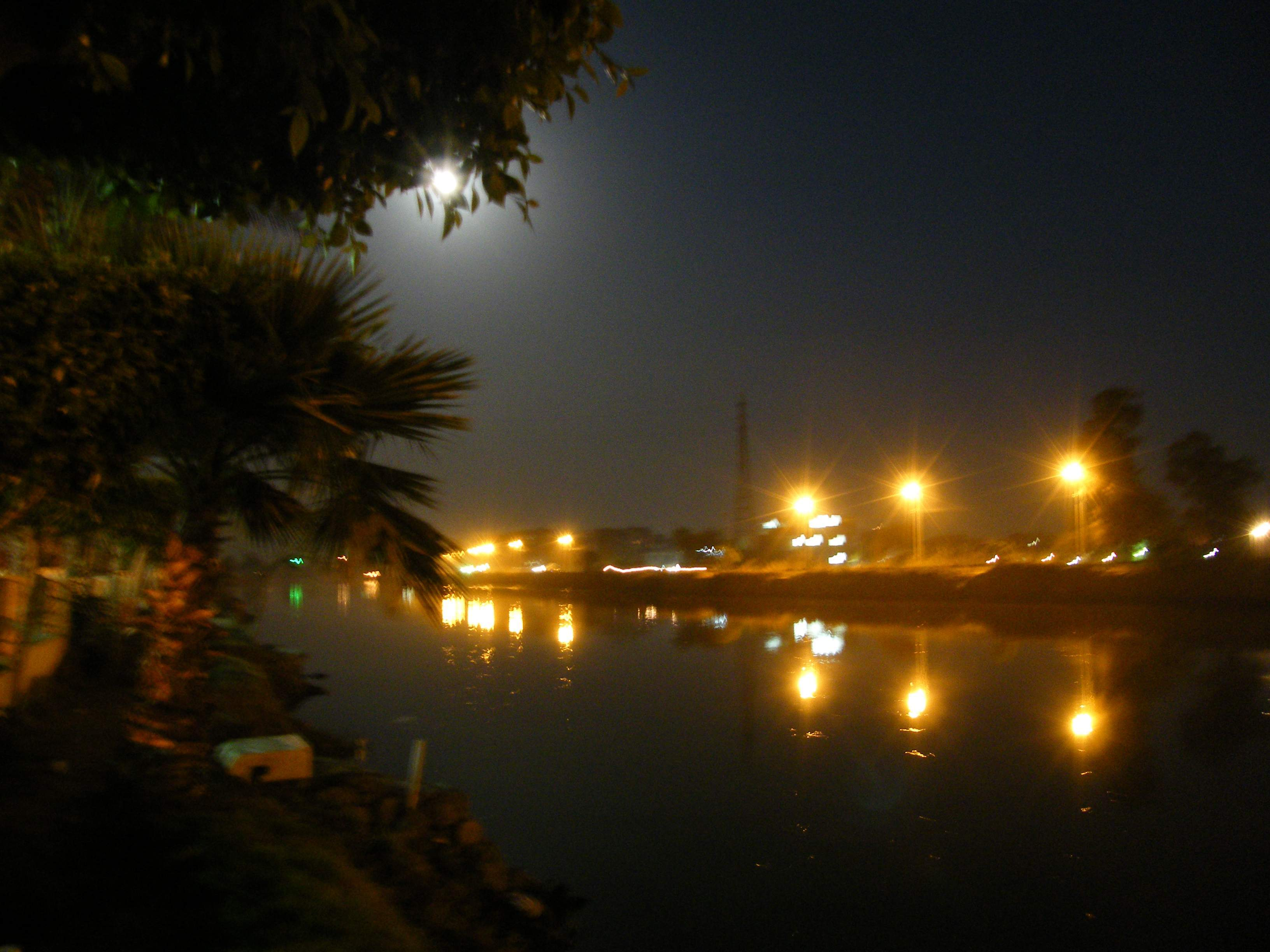
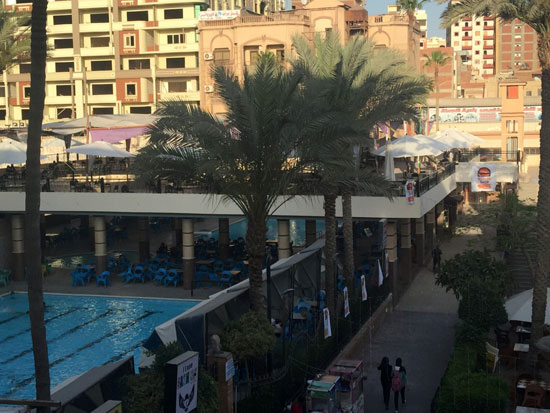
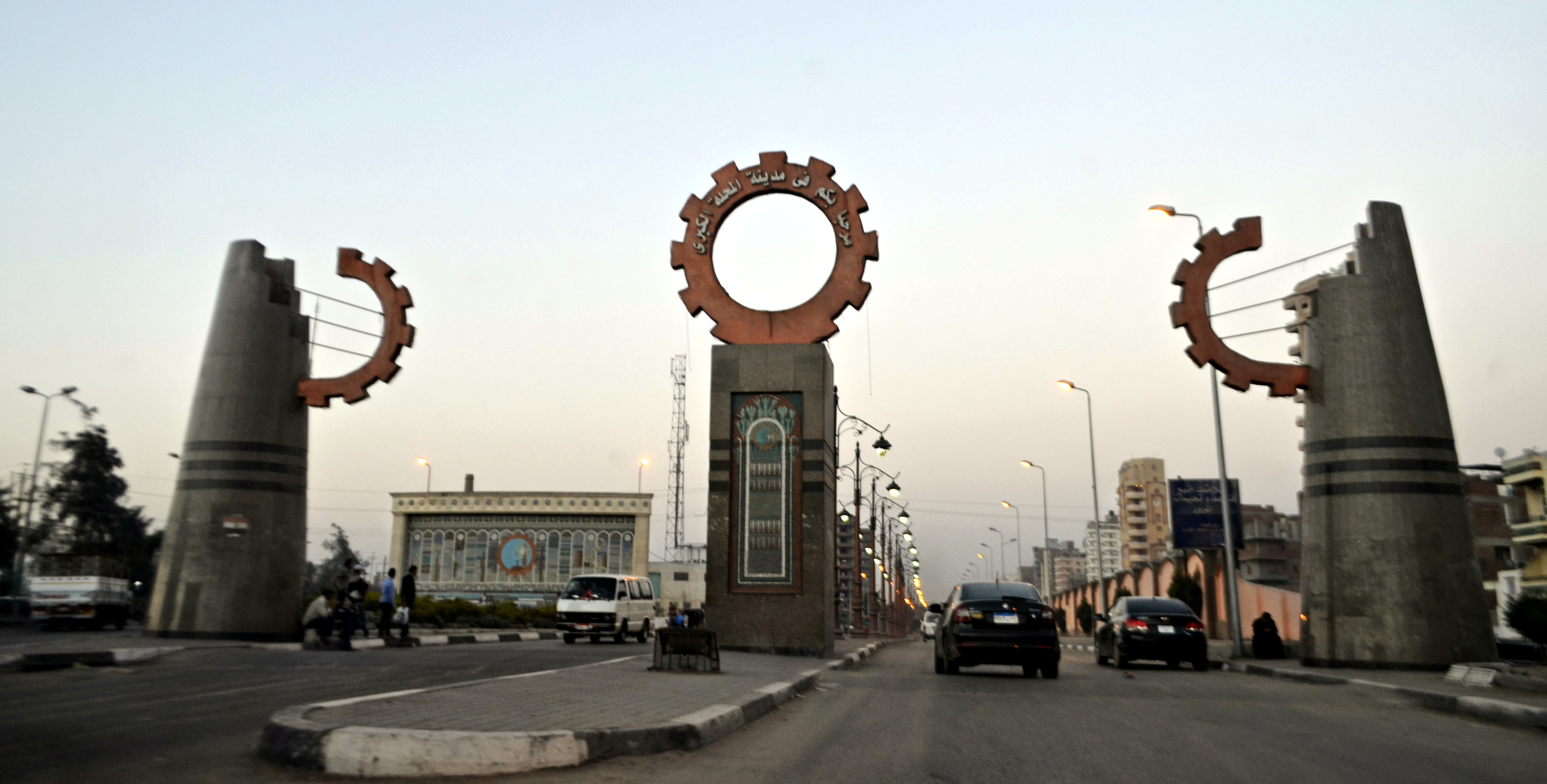
- Clockwise from top: Mural at the entrance to the city, Night Panorama, Mahalla Club, El Mahalla El Kobra gate

- Location in Egypt
- Coordinates: 30°58′07″N 31°09′49″E
- Country: Egypt
- Governorate: Gharbia
- Named for: "great mahallah"

Area
  - Total: 18.9 km^{2} (7.3 sq mi)
- Elevation: 17 m (56 ft)

Population (2024)
  - Total: 550,000
  - Density: 29,000/km^{2} (75,000/sq mi)

GDP (nominal, constant 2015 values)
  - Year: 2024
  - Total: $3.3 billion
  - Per capita: $6,000
- Time zone: UTC+2 (EET)
  - Summer (DST): UTC+3 (EEST)
- Area code: (+20) 40

El Mahalla El Kubra (Arabic: المحلة الكبرى, Egyptian Arabic: [elmæˈħællæ lˈkobɾɑ]) – commonly shortened to El Maḥalla – is the largest city of the Gharbia Governorate and in the Nile Delta, with a population of 550,000 as of 2024. It is a large industrial and agricultural city in Egypt, located in the middle of the Nile Delta on the western bank of the Damietta Branch tributary. The city is known for its textile industry, and hosts the Misr Spinning and Weaving Company which employs around 27,000 people.

== Etymology ==
El Mahalla El Kubra consists of two words: El Mahalla in Arabic means "district" or "encampment", El Kubra means "great". Hence the title collectively means "The Great Encampment". The name is probably a rough translation of its Coptic Egyptian equivalent ti-Šairi (Coptic: ϯϣⲁⲓⲣⲓ, lit. 'cohabitation, residence').

== History ==
In the Chronicle of John of Nikiu el-Mahalla is also given a name Didouseya, which could be equated with Theodosiou (Coptic: ⲑⲉⲟⲇⲱⲥⲓⲟⲩ). It is given as Theodosiou Nixis (Coptic: ⲑⲉⲟⲇⲱⲥⲓⲟⲩ ⲛⲓⲝⲓⲥ) by Daressy, but it's rather an equation of two nearby towns (Theodosiou and Nixis, modern Nawasa (Arabic: نَوَسا)), common for Coptic Scalae, rather than a compound name. The modern area Suq al-Laban is located on Didouseya Hill.

The city was also known as Mahalla Daqla (Arabic: محلة دقلا), where second word could be a corruption of Dakahla.

An ancient village Sandafa (Arabic: صندفا, Coptic: ⲥⲉⲛⲧⲉϥⲉ) was located south of el-Mahalla. North of it was a village Hureyn Baharmis (Arabic: هورين بهرمس), the name of which suggests that it was an ancient river-port (Coptic: ⲡϩⲟⲣⲙⲟⲥ, romanized: phormos, lit. 'the port'), whose namesake is mentioned in Demotic sources (Ancient Egyptian: Ḥwrn.t). In 1844 the city absorbed both villages.

El Mahalla El Kubra was designated as the capital of Gharbia Governorate in 1320 by Ibn Qalawun, before it was relocated to Tanta in 1836.

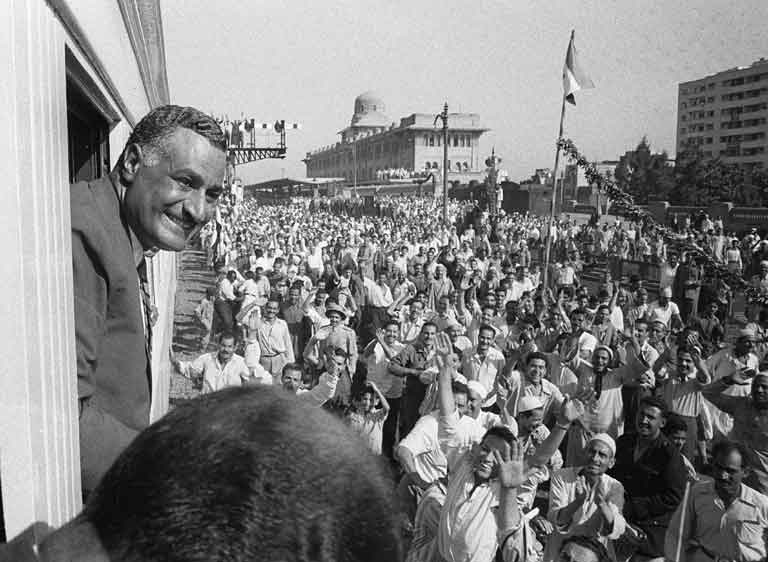
President Gamal Abd El Nasser waves to crowds in El Mahalla El Kubra as he departs the city, 1959

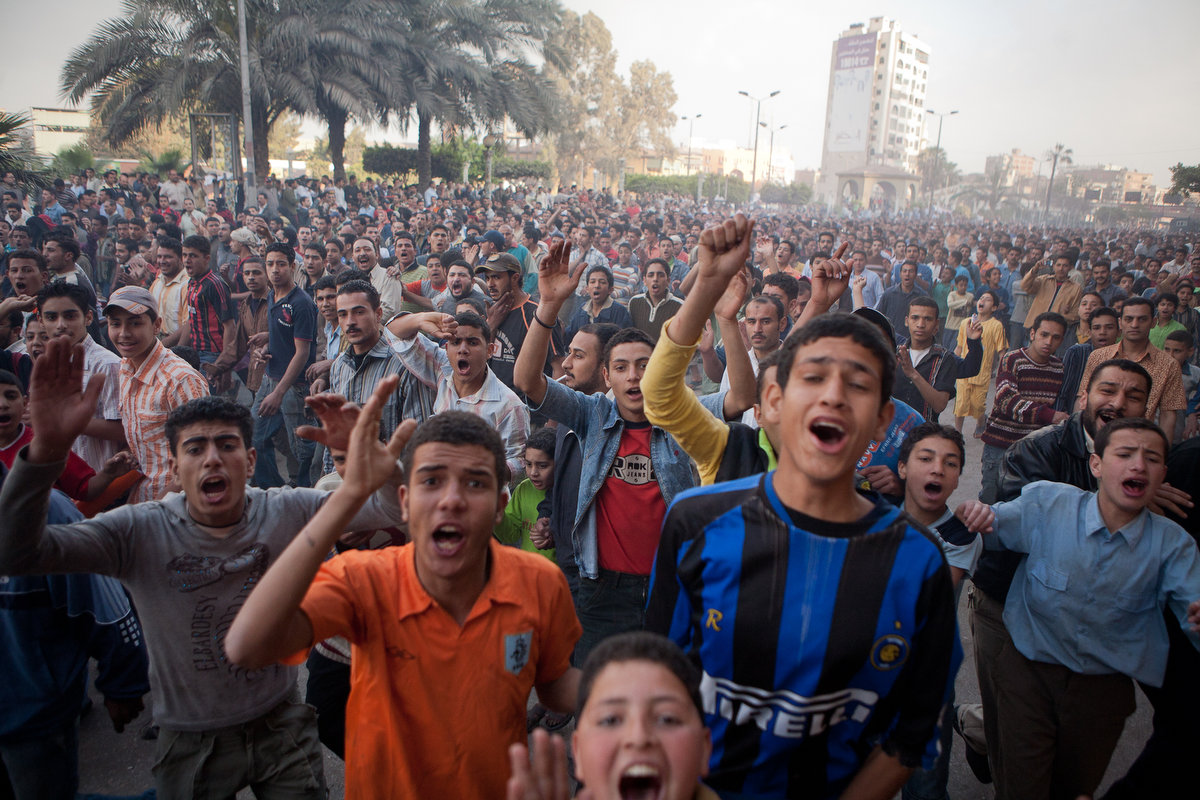
Protesters took to the street on April 7, 2008, as part of the 6 April movement.

=== 2006–11 protests ===
Over 15,000 protesters clashed with police in El Mahalla in 2006, following the publication of a cartoon mocking Islam in Denmark.

Later in 2006 textile workers struck to protest market reforms, demanding better living conditions.

Beginning in April 2008 the city held mass demonstrations protesting the election results of President Hosni Mubarak, claiming election fraud and demanding better wages. Security forces were ordered to crack down on the dissidents, and in May they killed two or three in the city and injured dozens. Images of protesters in Mahalla overturning billboards of Mubarak were viewed by some Egyptians as a turning point in Egyptian politics, according to The Washington Post. The Observer has written that protests in El Mahalla from 2006 to 2011 spearheaded larger political changes throughout Egypt. A Facebook group established by 28-year-old engineer Ahmad Maher to support striking textile workers in El Mahalla gained 70,000 followers and helped organize support for the strikers nationally.

In 2011, protests in Mahalla contributed to the collapse of the Mubarak dictatorship.

=== 2012 protests and declaration of autonomy ===
On 15 July 2012, 25,000 workers from El Mahalla El Kubra's Misr Spinning and Weaving Company went on strike, demanding increased profit sharing, better retirement benefits and a replacement of the management. The Misr workers were joined by workers from seven other textile factories in the region, and strikes also broke out among doctors and health workers, university workers, and ceramics workers in other parts of Egypt.

Clashes between protesters supporting or opposing the Muslim Brotherhood on November 28 left over 100 people injured. On December 7, the city declared itself autonomous from Egypt, as workers and students, declaring themselves independent from the "Muslim Brotherhood State", cut rail lines and blocked entrances to the city. Protesters stormed the city council and announced their intentions to replace it with a revolutionary council.

== Geography ==
=== Climate ===
The Köppen–Geiger climate classification system classifies its climate as hot desert (BWh).

Climate data for El Mahalla El Kubra
Month	Jan	Feb	Mar	Apr	May	Jun	Jul	Aug	Sep	Oct	Nov	Dec	Year
Mean daily maximum °C (°F)	18.6 (65.5)	19.6 (67.3)	22.4 (72.3)	26.4 (79.5)	31.2 (88.2)	32.8 (91.0)	33.5 (92.3)	33.6 (92.5)	31.8 (89.2)	28.9 (84.0)	24.8 (76.6)	20.4 (68.7)	27.0 (80.6)
Daily mean °C (°F)	12.1 (53.8)	12.8 (55.0)	15.3 (59.5)	18.7 (65.7)	22.8 (73.0)	25.2 (77.4)	26.6 (79.9)	26.5 (79.7)	24.7 (76.5)	22.2 (72.0)	18.9 (66.0)	14.2 (57.6)	20.0 (68.0)
Mean daily minimum °C (°F)	5.6 (42.1)	6 (43)	8.2 (46.8)	11 (52)	14.5 (58.1)	17.7 (63.9)	19.7 (67.5)	19.4 (66.9)	17.6 (63.7)	15.6 (60.1)	13 (55)	8 (46)	13.0 (55.4)
Average precipitation mm (inches)	14 (0.6)	10 (0.4)	7 (0.3)	4 (0.2)	3 (0.1)	0 (0)	0 (0)	0 (0)	0 (0)	3 (0.1)	7 (0.3)	12 (0.5)	60 (2.5)
Source: climate-data.org

== Buildings and structures ==
El Mahalla El Kubra contains Misr Spinning and Weaving Company, the largest cotton manufacturing company in Egypt, and the clock of Big Ben is made by this company.

== Economy ==
El Mahalla El Kubra is home to the largest public sector Egyptian textile company, the Misr Spinning and Weaving Company, employing over 27,000 workers.

== Sport ==
The city has two football teams: Ghazl Al-Mehalla and Baladeyet Al-Mahalla.

== Notable people ==
- Mahmoud Mokhtar, a legendary Egyptian sculptor
- Salah Zulfikar, legendary actor
- Cyril of Alexandria, Patriarch of Alexandria from 412 to 444
- Ahmed Elmohamady, Egyptian Footballer
- Shawky Gharieb, former footballer and coach
- Mohamed Elneny, footballer
- Reham Abdel Ghafour, actress

== See also ==
- List of cities and towns in Egypt
- April 6 Youth Movement
