= Sidi Ghazy =

City in Egypt

Sidi Ghazy سيدي غازي
- City
- Interactive map of Sidi Ghazy
- Location within Egypt
- Coordinates: 31°12′40″N 31°03′04″E
- Country: Egypt
- Governorate: Kafr El Sheikh

Area
  - Total: 15.4 km^{2} (5.9 sq mi)

Population
  - Total: 25,577
- Time zone: UTC+2 (EGY)
  - Summer (DST): UTC+3 (EEST)

Sidi Ghazy or Sidi Ghazi (Arabic; سيدي غازي) is a city located in Kafr El Sheikh Governorate, Egypt. It is subordinate to the Kafr El Sheikh Center.

== History ==
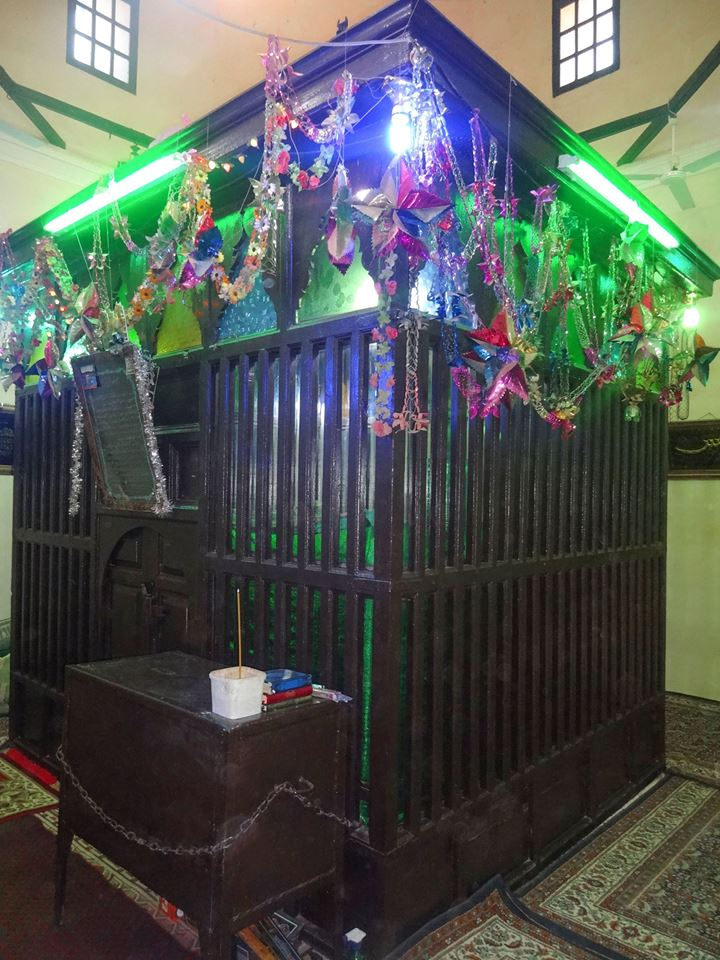
Shrine of Sidi Mohammad Al Moghazy

Sidi Ghazy was built around the shrine of Sidi Mohammad Al Moghazy, a man born in Fez, Morocco in 1187 AD. He was the founder of 'Al Moghazya Al Khlwatya' Sufi order. Ghazy died near the village of Dier Shobra Kalsa. People started moving into the village and expanding it after his death. It became known to the locals as Zawyet Sidi Ghazy. The city got its modern name from his shrine, which was shortened to Sidi Ghazy, with Sidi meaning 'my master'.

Following the 1952 Revolution Land Reform, the village started expanding into nearby agricultural land. On 6 January 2014, Sidi Ghazy was upgraded from a rural village into an autonomous municipal city pursuant to Egyptian Prime Ministerial Decree No. 1530.

== Demographics ==
Sidi Ghazy had a total population of 25,577 residents in 2017, with 12,790 of them being males and 12,787 being female.
